= Karunamoyee Rani Rashmoni =

Indian Bengali television mythological drama series

- Also known as: Rani Rashmoni Uttor Porbo
- Genre: Drama; society; history; mythology
- Created by: Subrata Roy; Samrat Ghosh
- Developed by: Shibasish Bandopadhyay
- Written by: Anjan Chakraborty
- Screenplay by: Saswati Ghosh
- Story by: Saswati Ghosh
- Directed by: Rupak Dey
- Creative directors: Saswati Ghosh; Rajendra Prasad Das
- Starring: Ditipriya Roy; Gazi Abdun Nur; Dhrubajyoti Sarkar; Gourab Chatterjee; Sourav Saha; Sandipta Sen; Roshni Bhattacharya; Susmili Acharjee; Suman Dey
- Opening theme: Tomar Tulona Tumi .... Korunamoyee Rani Rashmoni
- Composer: Upali Chattopadhyay
- Country of origin: India
- Original language: Bengali
- No. of seasons: 1
- No. of episodes: 1549

Production
- Executive producers: Krishanu Ganguly; Subhangi Ghosh
- Producer: Subrata Roy (Past)
- Production location: Kolkata
- Cinematography: Santu Goldar
- Editors: Jishu Nath; Biplab Mondal
- Camera setup: Multi-camera
- Running time: 22 minutes
- Production companies: Subrata Roy Production (2017-2019); Zee Bangla (2019-2022)

Original release
- Network: Zee Bangla
- Release: 24 July 2017 – 13 February 2022

Karunamoyee Rani Rashmoni (lit. 'Compassionate Queen Rashmoni') was an Indian Bengali historical drama television series which aired on Bengali Entertainment Channel Zee Bangla and is also available on the digital platform ZEE5. It was premiered on 24 July 2017. The serial was earlier produced by Subrata Roy and then it was produced by Zee Bangla. One of the longest running Bengali television soap opera, the series completed 1,000 episodes on its third birthday (24 July 2020) and 1,500 episodes on 26 December 2021. After a successful run of 4 1/2 years, Karunamoyee Rani Rashmoni went off-air on 13 February 2022.

The show starred Ditipriya Roy in the title role as Rani Rashmoni, the deeply spiritual and liberal-minded "Rani" of 19th century, Gazi Abdun Noor and Gourab Chatterjee among others. The show was received well by the audience.

On July 4, 2021, Rani Rashmoni's character came to end showcasing her death. The show got revamped into a new season titled "Karunamoyee Rani Rashmoni - Uttar Porbo" focusing on the life of Ramakrishna Paramahamsa (portrayed by Sourav Saha) - his spiritual journey and marriage with holy mother Sarada Devi (portrayed by Sandipta Sen).

== Plot ==
Rani Rashmoni (best known for being the founder of the Dakshineswar Kali Temple and for her untamed zeal and fight against the aggression of the British East India Company in 19th century at Bengal) and narrates the events of her life, starting from her being a young girl of 11, named "Rani", residing with her Vaishnav father and aunt in her ancestral village Halisahar to marrying ‘Babu Rajchandra Das’ of Janbazar, Kolkata; and how she becomes an extraordinary woman fighting against all odds during the then British ruled patriarchal society. The show upholds the quest of her life with the backdrop of the famous Marh family of Janbazar.

=== Uttar Parba ===
The story revolves around the life of Ramkrishna Paramhansha Dev and Sarada Devi and the backdrop of the Dakshineswar Temple and the Marh family of Janbazar after Rani Rashmoni aka Ranima's death.

== Cast ==
=== Main ===
- Ditipriya Roy as Rani Rashmoni aka "Rani"/"Rani maa" - A Businesswoman, Entrepreneur, Philanthropist, Zamindar, Social Activist, Social Reformer, founder of Dakshineshwar Kali Temple, The defendant woman and Rani maa of Janbazar, Rajchandra's widow (2017-2022)
- Gazi Abdun Noor as
  - Harchandra Das - Pritoram and Jogmaya's elder son, Rajchandra's twin elder brother, Anandamoyee's late husband. (2017)
  - Babu Raj Chandra Das (Marh) - the wealthy and magnanimous Zamindar, Social Reformer, Philanthropist, Businessman of Janbazar, Rashmoni's late husband (2017-2019)
- Sourav Saha as Sri Sri Ramakrishna Paramahamsa Dev - an Indian mystic and saint of 19th century Bengal. He is believed to be an incarnation of Lord Vishnu himself (2019–2022)
  - Swarnava Sanyal as Child Gadadhar/ Ramkrishna (2018)
- Sandipta Sen as Sarada Devi - one of the notable woman saints and mystics of the nineteenth century and wife of Sri Sri Ramakrishna Paramahamsa Dev. She is believed to be an incarnation of Lakshmi Devi herself (2021-2022)
  - Ayanna Chatterjee as child Saradamoni a.k.a Maa Sarada (2021)
- Sampurna Mondal / Roshni Bhattacharya / Mimi Dutta as Jagadamba Biswas (née Das) aka Choto Khuki - Rajchandra and Rashmoni's youngest daughter, she is liberal minded, dedicated and fearless by nature; just like her mother Rani Rashmoni, Mathuramohon's second wife and widow (2018–2022)
- Gourab Chatterjee as Mathurmohan Biswas aka "Mathur" - Karunamoyee's widower and Raj Chandra, Rashmoni's youngest son-in-law. He became like a son to Rashmoni-Rajchandra that they never had biologically. After Karunamoyee's death, he married Jagadamba, her younger sister (2018-2021)
- Susmili Acharjee as Kumudini Biswas / Indumoti Biswas - wife of Dwarikanath Biswas and daughter-in-law to Jagadamba and Mathuramohan Biswas. She is strong willed, open minded and fearless by nature. Her actions often represents her grandmother-in-law Rani Rashmoni (2021–2022)
- Nilotpal Banerjee / Suman Dey as Dwarikanath Biswas, eldest son of Jagadamba Dasi and Mathuramohan Biswas, grandson of Rani Rashmoni. He was a devotee of Sri Sri Ramakrishna Paramhansa Dev and helped his mother Jagadamba Dasi in constructing the Annapurna Temple (2019–2022)

=== Recurring ===
- Sohan Bandopadhyay as Pritoram Das (Marh) - Jogmaya's husband, Raj Chandra's father and Rashmoni's father-in-law (2017-2018)
- Samata Das as Jogmaya Das (née Manna) aka "Maya" / "Jugi" - Jugal Manna's daughter, Pritoram Marh's widow, Raj Chandra's mother and Rashmoni's mother-in-law (2017-2018)
- Suchandra Banerjee as Sukumari Das - Pritoram's youngest brother Kaliprasad's wife, sister-in-law of Jogmaya Dasi, Rajchandra's aunt, Abhay's mother. She is wicked and is greedy for wealth and wants her grandson Madhab to inherit Raj Chandra's property (2017-2019)
- Indrajit Deb as Jugalkishore Manna (Jugal Manna) - Jogmaya's father and Raj Chandra's maternal grandfather (2017-2018)
- Runa Bandopadhyay as Jogmaya's mother and Raj Chandra's maternal grandmother (2017-2018)
- Nibedita Chakrabarty as Raj Chandra's elder grandaunt (2017-2018)
- Abijit Debroy as Ramtanu Das (Marh)
- Priyanka Halder as Bordasundari Devi
- Tania Kar as Anandamoyee Das aka Anandi - Harchandra's widow, elder sister-in-law of Rashmoni, widowed at young age (2017-2019)
- Dhrubajyoti Sarkar as
  - Abhay Charan Das (2017-2018) (previously)
  - Dakshin Ray (2021)
- Sudeep Raha as Abhay Charan Das - Sarajoo and Harimati's husband, Kaliprasad and Sukumari's son, Raj Chandra's younger cousin, Rashmoni's younger brother-in-law, Madhab's father. She is wicked and is greedy for wealth and wants he to inherit Pritoram and Raj Chandra's property (2018-2020)
- Ashmita Chakraborty as Harimati Das - Abhay's second wife (2019-2020)
- Shyamoupti Mudly / Ipshita Mukherjee as Sarajoo Das - Abhay's first wife, Rashmoni's younger sister-in-law, Madhab's mother who later left her husband because of his wickedness (2017-2019)
- Diya Chakrabarty as Padmamoni Das Ata (née Das) aka "Padma" - Raj Chandra-Rashmoni's eldest daughter, Ram Chandra's wife (2018–2022)
  - Rinisa Dutta as Young Padma
- Chandraneev Mukherjee / Saurav Chakraborty as Ram Chandra Das Ata aka "Atamoshai" - Padma's husband, Raj Chandra-Rashmoni's eldest son-in-law (2018-2022)
  - Ayush Das as Young Ram Chandra (2018)
- Saheli Ghosh Roy / Ashmee Ghosh as Kumari Choudhury (née Das) - Raj Chandra-Rashmoni's second daughter, Pyarimohan's wife (2018-2019)
  - Rishita Nandy as Young Kumari (2018)
- Parthiv Banerjee as Pyarimohan Choudhury - Kumari's widower, Raj Chandra-Rashmoni's second son-in-law (2018-2019)
- Oindrila Saha as Karunamoyee Biswas (née Das) aka "Karuna" - Raj Chandra-Rashmoni's third daughter, Mathuramohan's first wife who died after giving birth to her child, Bhupal (2018)
- Pritam Das as Madhab Chandra Das - Abhay and Saraju's son, Raj Chandra-Rashmoni's nephew, Sukumari's grandson, Padma's younger cousin brother, Kumari-Karuna-Jagadamba's elder cousin brother. He was a man of virtue in spite of his father and grandmother's continuous evil opinions (2018-2019)
- Sayak Chakraborty as Mahendra Das aka Mohen, eldest son of Padmamani Dasi and Ramchandra Ata, grandson of Rani Rashmoni (2019-2020)
- Subhrojit Saha as Jadunath Choudhury aka Jadu, son of Kumari Dasi, grandson of Rani Rashmoni, Ashalata's widower (2019-2020)
- Biswabasu Biswas as Bhupal Chandra Biswas, son of Mathuramohan Biswas and his first wife Karunamoyee Das, grandson of Rani Rashmoni (2019-2021)
- Somashri Bhattacharya as Prasannamoyee Das aka Prasanno, wife of Bhupal Chandra, eldest daughter-in-law to Jagadamba Dasi and Mathuramohan Biswas (2019-2021)
- Beas Dhar as Nistarini Hazra (née Biswas) - Mathur Babu and Jagadamba Dasi's daughter (2019-2020)
- Alokananda Guha as Ashalata, first wife of Jadunath, daughter-in-law of Kumari Dasi and Pyarimohan Choudhury (2019)
- Aniket Chakraborty / Arunava Dey as Trailokyanath Biswas aka Trailokyo, second son of Mathur Babu and Jagadamba Dasi (2019–2022)
- Poonam Basak as Kanaklata Biswas aka Konok, Trailokyonath's first wife, Jagadamba and Mathur's daughter-in-law (2021–2022)
- Deerghoi Paul as Subhasini Biswas aka Subhash, Trailokyonath's second wife, Jagadamba and Mathur's daughter-in-law (2021–2022)
- Soumi Chakraborty as Kamala Acharya - Mahendra's widow, eldest daughter-in-law to Padmamani Dasi and Ramchandra Ata (2019–2022)
- Amitava Das as Raghabendra Acharya, he married the widow of Mahendra, Kamala (2020-2022)
- Pronnoy Chandra / Koushik Das as Ganeshchandra Das Ata, youngest son of Padmamani Dashi and Ramchandra Ata (2020–2022)
- Promita Chakraborty as Annada Sundari, wife of Ganesh Chandra (2020–2022)
- Sujoy Sinha as Bhudebmohan Chowdhury, Pyarimohan's father (2019)
- Sujoy Saha as Doyal Hazra, Nistarini's husband (2021)
- Aritra Dutta as Dhiren, Doyal's elder cousin brother (2021)
- Arghya Mukherjee as Dhiren's father (2021)
- Sahana Sen as Dhiren's mother (2021)
- Prantik Banerjee as Prankrishna Biswas - Mathur's elder brother, previously engaged to Karuna, Manmohini's husband (2018-2019)
- Soumi Ghosh as Manmohini Biswas - Prankrishna's wife (2019)
- Diganta Bagchi as Joy Narayan Biswas - Prankrishna and Mathuramohan's father, he is egoistic and estranged Mathur as a son owing to his ego as Mathur married Karuna without his permission. He is the Zamindar of Bithari village (2018-2019)
- Ayesha Bhattacharya as Mongola - Rajchanda's maternal cousin sister. (2017-2018)
- Anirban Guha
- Shankar Debnath as Harekrishna Das - Rashmoni's father (2017-2018)
- Suchandrima as Khemankari Devi, Harekrishna's younger sister, Rashmoni's paternal aunt who raised her (2017)
- Gora Dhar as
  - Kanai - A resident of Kona village (2017)
  - Krishnadhon Mallick - Nayeb of Jagannathpur (2019)
- Sarbari Mukherjee as Lokkhi - A resident of Kona village and servant of Janbazar house (2017)
- Manoj Ojha as Ramkumar Chattopadhyay, elder brother of Gadadhar, and the former chief priest of Dakshineswar Kali Temple (2019-2020)
- Samriddho as
  - Young Ramkumar (2018)
  - Young Ganesh Chandra (2019)
- Twarita Chatterjee as Shyamasundari Mukhopadhyay - mother of Saradamoni (2021)
- Anindya Sarkar as
  - Matilal Bahadur - Businessman (2018)
  - Indranath Ghosh (2021)
- Shaktipada Dey as Haladhari Thakur (2020–2022)
- Siddhartha Ghosh as Hriday Thakur (2019–2022)
- Sujata Dawn / Lopamudra Sinha as Late Chandramani Devi - Shri Ramakrishna's mother (2018–2022)
- Aditya Roy as Rameshwar - Shri Ramakrishna's second elder brother (2020-2021)
- Kanyakumari Mukherjee / Prarona Bhattacharya as Shibani - Rameshwar's wife Shri Ramakrishna's second elder sister-in-law (2020-2021)
- Bhaswar Chatterjee as Khudiram Chattopadhyay - Shri Ramakrishna's father, a priest (2018)
- Samir Biswas as Chakrabarty Moshai - A priest and saint. (2017)
- Aditi Chatterjee as Bhairavi Brahmani (or Yogeshwari) - a Yogeshwari who initiated Ramakrishna into Tantra (2021)
- Anindita Bhattacharya / Tanushree Bhattacharya Bose / Rumpa Das as the divine goddess Bhabotarini-Annapurna, a form of Bhabotarini - Janbazar's house's and Dakshineshwar temple's respected goddess (2018–2022)
- Biswanath Basu as Nagendranath Choudhury (2021-2022)
- Diya Mukherjee as Binodini Dasi (2022)
- Subhrajit Dutta as Girish Chandra Ghosh (2022)
- Subhajit Banerjee as
  - Dr. Bidhunath Gupta (2019)
  - Robin Saheb (2021)
- Subrata Mitra as Makhon - A resident of Sundarban. (2021)
- Indrakshi Nag as Jogendramohini Dasi aka Jogen - comes in Dakshineshwar to give puja to Maa Bhabotarini (2021-2022)
- Avrajit Chakraborty as Agnikacharan - Jogendramohini's husband (2021)
- Sangita Ghosh as Moynaboti - a girl who come to meet with Ramkrishna (2021–2022)
- Chandicharan as
  - T.J. Kreg - English Judge (2018)
  - Brahmapada Acharya - Acharya of Dakshineshwar Kali Temple (2021)
- Rajat Ganguly as Advocate Peterberg - English Lawyer (2018)
- Sandip Dey as Rudreshwar Bhairav (2021)
- Dedipya Ganguly as Bishtucharan (2021)
- Kaushambi Chakraborty as Maa Mahakali - a form of Maa Bhabatarini (2021)
- Arindol Bagchi as Haran Thakur (2020–2022)
- Rahul Chakraborty as Jotadhari Baba - Gurudeb (2021)
- Gautam Mukherjee as Haran - A Fisherman (2019)
- Mridul Mazumder as Ratan - A resident of Jagannathpur village (2019)
- Aishwarya Roy as Maa Kali disguised as a child (2017-2019)
- Hiya Dey as Maa kali - form of Maa Bhabatarini (2018)
- Debraj Mukherjee as Bhairav Dakat (2018)
- Biplab Banerjee (younger) as
  - Koral Moshai (2018)
  - Gurudev (2021)
- Rajiv Bose as Daroga Babu (2018)
- Dipanjan Jack Bhattacharya as Gangaram Chowdhury - A dacoit (2018)
- Indrani Bhattacharya as Moynasundari Bai - A Baiji (2018)
- Rupsa Chatterjee as Lusa Donald - Memsaheb (2018)
- Ishani Sengupta as Durga - a resident of Mukimpur village (2017-2018)
- Arnab Bhadra as Mahesh - Durga's husband (2018)
- Sayan Karmakar as English Man (2019)
- Debomoy Mukherjee as
  - Colonel Johns Nickel - East India Company officer (2019)
  - Dinabandhu Mitra - A writer (2020)
- Ashim Mukherjee as Colonel Bronson - East India Company officer (2019)
- Sounak Roy as Samuel Johnson - East India Company officer (2019)
- Biplab Banerjee (older) as Haranath Mukhopaddhay (2019)
- Nilanjan Dutta as
  - Sashadhar - A Thuggee (2018)
  - Robinson - English Businessman (2019)
  - Ratan Ray - A resident of Shibpukur (2020)
- Rohit Mukherjee as Lord William Bentinck - Governor General of Bengal Presidency (2018)
- Arindya Banerjee as Atkinson - East India Company Officer (2018)
- Partha Sarathi Deb as Gurudev of Janbazar house (2020)
- Arindam Banerjee as Head Gurudev of Janbazar house (2018-2020)
- Samadipta Mukherjee as Rupmatibai - came in Janbazar's house to sing (2021)
- Shamik Chakraborty as Meghnath Upadhayay (2020)
- Boni Mukherjee as Umaboti Upadhayay (2020)
- Arijit Chowdhury as Captain Robert Halliday (2021)
- Goutam Dey as Bachaspati Mahashoy - head of contemporary (orthodox) Brahmin society of early 19th century Bengal (2018)
- Barun Chanda as Aghor Shastri Mahashoy - former head of contemporary Brahmin society of early 19th century Bengal, orthodox in mindset (2017-2018)
- Jagriti Goswami as mother of Kalimoti (2020)
- Sanjib Sarkar as Tarkalankar Mahashoy - head of contemporary Brahmin society after Bachaspati Mahashoy's demise. He is an orthodox Hindu and has strained relations with the Marh family over frequent disputes (2019-2020)
- Vascar Dev as Sukumar Brahmachari (2019-2020)
- Buddhadeb Bhattacharya as Shibananda Brahmachari (2020)
- Joyjit Banerjee as Donald Saheb (2020)
- Judhajit Banerjee as Ramnath Mallick (2020)
- Suman Banerjee as Sitanath Mallick (2020)
- Anindita Raychaudhury as Champabati (2020)
- Fahim Mirza as Raja Ram Mohan Roy (2017-2019)
- Goutam Halder as Mrityunjai Vidyalankar (2017)
- Raj Bhattacharya as Prince Dwarkanath Tagore (2018)
- Sourav Chatterjee as Raja Radhakanta Deb (2018-2019)
- Sourav Das as Ishwar Chandra Vidyasagar (2018-2020)
- Kaushik Banerjee as Sabarna Roy Choudhury (2018)
- Debopriyo Mukherjee as Michael Madhusudan Dutt (2022)
- Sumit Samaddar as Brojohari - a Thuggee (2018)
- Juiee Sarkar as Napit Bou (2018)
- Rita Dutta Chakraborty as Kapalika (2019)
- Ashok Mukherjee as Ramcharan Mitra - Nayeb of Janbazar (2017-2020)
- Amlan Mazumder as Krishnakanto Mitra - Nayeb of Mahimshahi (2018)
- Subhashish Banerjee as Ramdoyal Ghosh - Nayeb of Mukimpur (2020)
- Shankar Sanku Chakrabarty as Ramdhon Mallick - Nayeb and Dewan of Rani Rashmoni (2020-2022)
- Neil Chatterjee as
  - Samuel - English Man (2018)
  - Swami Vivekananda (2022)
- Subrata Guha Roy as Ramratan Roy (2019)
- Saptarshi Ray as
  - Talukder Moshai - Marh family's rival. (2018-2020)
  - Dr. Mahendralal Sarkar (2022)
- Saugata Bandapadhyay as Sadananda Bandapadhyay (2017-2019)
- Aritram Mukherjee as Shibananda Bandapadhyay (2017-2018))
- Subhra Sourav Das as Anmary Saheb - English Man (2018)
- Shirsha Guha Thakurta as Kusum Dasi - the young widow. Her father was a doctor (Boddimoshai) who saved the life of Jagadamba when she became ill during a widespread famine. Madhab has a soft corner for Kusum and wants to marry her (2019)
- Aratrika Maity as Padma Dasi (2019)
- Arindam Ganguly as Nidhu Babu, the famous Tappa singer (2017)

== Reception ==
In week 50 of 2020, the series has risen to fifth place with 4.701 million impressions for the most watched television series in Bengal.
