= Babu Ghat =

Ghat of Kolkata, West Bengal, India

Coordinates: 22.566315°N 88.339823°E

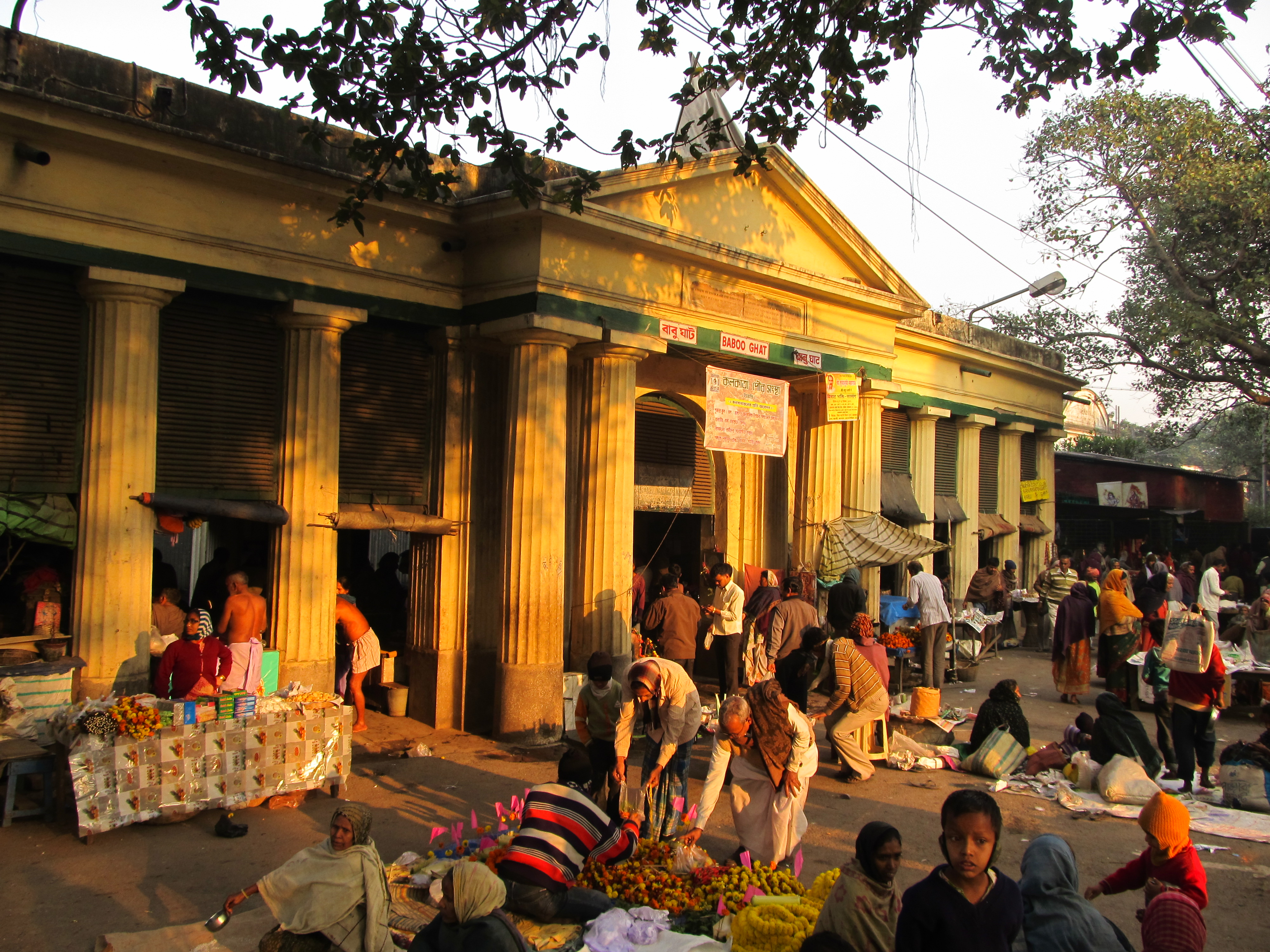
The Babu Ghat pavilion on Strand Road, Kolkata

Babughat (also Babooghat, or Baje Kadamtala Ghat, and Baboo Raj Chandra Ghat) is one of the many ghats built during British Raj, along the bank of Hooghly River on Strand Road, Kolkata at B. B. D. Bagh, Kolkata. The landing berth of the ghat has a tall colonial structure. It is a fine Doric-Greek style pavilion with huge pillars.

== History ==
The ghat, originally known as Baboo Raj Chandra Ghat, is now only known by first words Baboo-ghat or Babu-ghat. Babu/Baboo in Bengali means Sahib or gentleman. The ghat is named after Babu Raj Chandra Das, husband of Rani Rashmoni and zamindar of Janbazar, who built it in 1830, in memory of her late husband. A marble tablet beneath the pediment implies that some of the credit for the erection of the ghat must go to Lord William Bentinck as he encouraged such spending with a view to improve public amenities. It is second oldest ghat of Kolkata.

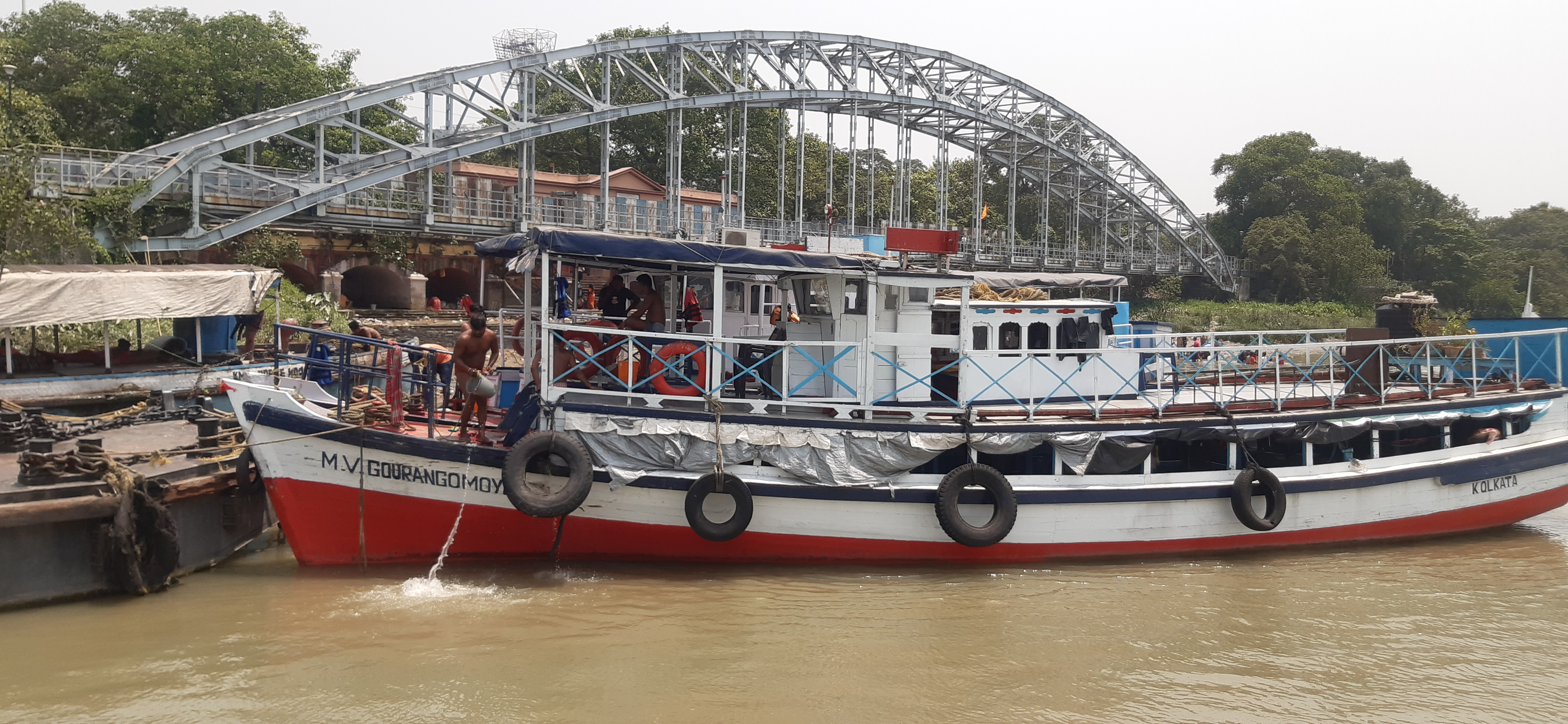
Babughat Bridge in April 2022

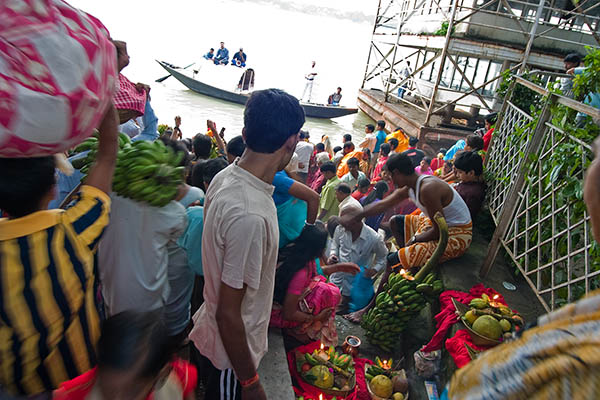
People performing Chhat Puja on Babughat, Kolkata

== Present condition ==
The pavilion today is completely encroached by vendors and priests. The old colonial structure and stairs leading to the river are in various stages of decay and derelict. A section of ghat originally meant for bathing of ladies has turned into a garbage point now. Even so, the ghat is bustling with crowds since morning till late evening with people who use it for bathing, puja, religious ceremonies, massage and leisure. During Chhat Puja, a huge crowd can be seen on Babughat performing their puja. The ghat is also used during Durga Puja, Saraswati Puja rather in all festivals for immersion of idols.

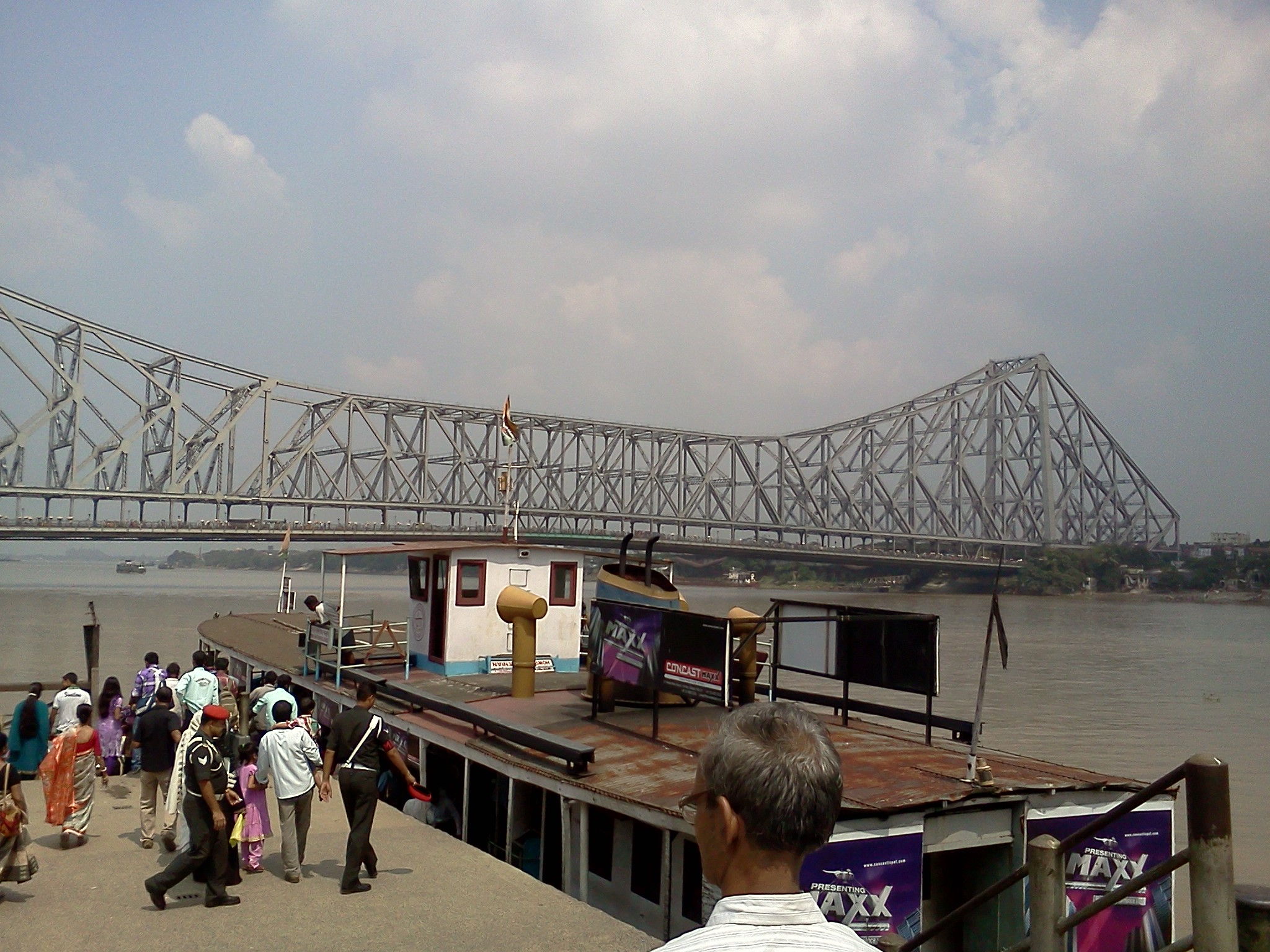
Hooghly River from Babughat, Kolkata

== Location & Importance ==
Babughat is always bustling with passengers, who use it cross the river to reach Howrah Station just across the river and also other areas of Howrah, ferries for which are available at frequent intervals, which take off from the jetty connected to ghat. The water ferry is run and maintained by Inland Waterways Corporation. Ferry services are available from Babughat to Howrah, Chandpal Ghat, Telkal Ghat and Bally.

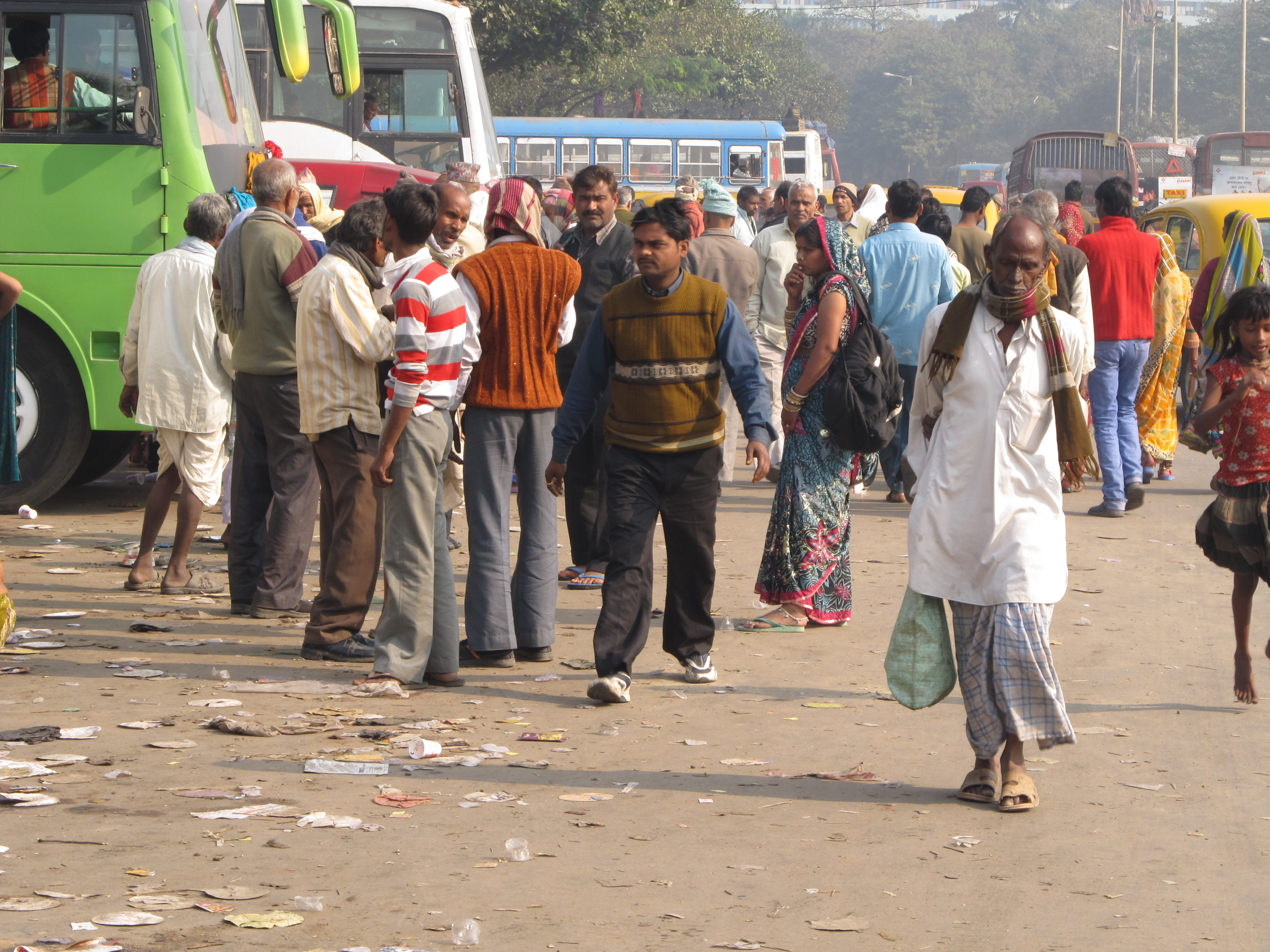
Babughat Bus Terminus

Also just outside the ghat is a bus terminus. Babughat is one of the main bus termini in the Kolkata apart from two others located at Esplanade and Howrah station. From there one can find interstate buses going into Bihar, Jharkhand, Odisha and other cities of West Bengal. Also there is another bus terminus from where one can find buses going in all directions of Kolkata and its neighborhood. These buses also carry the goods and merchandise to other states and people can find hand-carts and cycle-carts carrying merchandise to be loaded on various buses. The Babughat has vantage advantage as the business and commercial hub of city BBD Bagh is near-by. For this reason Babughat is humming with people and activities throughout twenty-four hours of day and night.

Further, Eden Gardens railway station of Kolkata Circular Railway is located just adjacent to Babughat and as such people commuting by train also get off and board trains from here.

The Eden Gardens and Netaji Indoor Stadium, West Bengal State Assembly, Calcutta Swimming Club, Calcutta High Court, Writer's Building, Prinsep Ghat are all located in vicinity of Babughat. Further, Millennium Park, a newly developed amusement park cum picnic spot opened in December 1999, along the Hooghly river stretch is also located just a few minutes walk from Babughat.

As Babughat is a unique junction point of Kolkata where one can find various modes of transport like, bus, ferry and train to go towards various direction, intelligence agencies of India had expressed concern that terrorists are using Babughat as transit point.
