= Nimtala Crematorium =

Historic site in Kolkata, India

- নিমতলা মহাশ্মশান (Bengali)
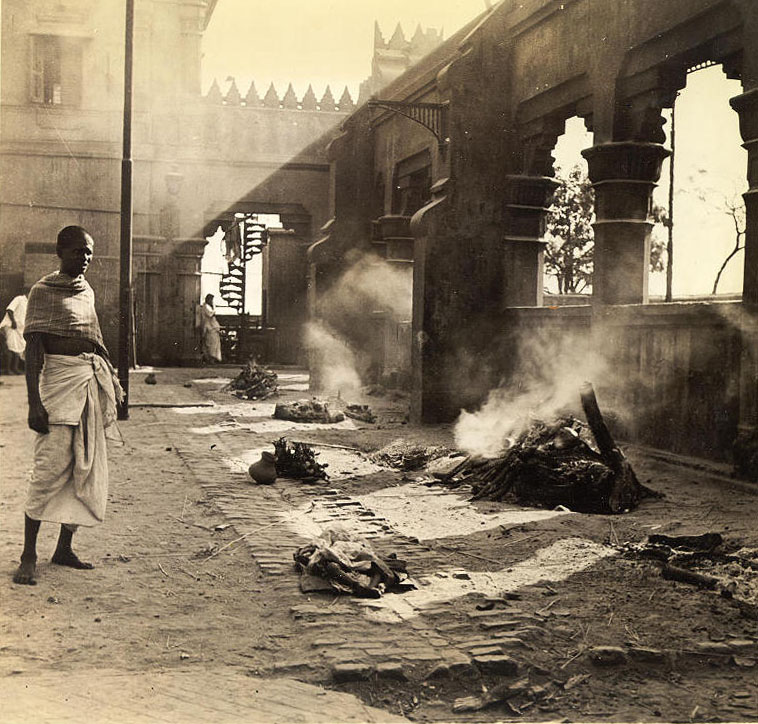
- The Nimtala burning ghat in 1945.
- Interactive map of Nimtala Crematorium
- Location: 2p, Strand Bank Road, Beadon Street, Kolkata – 700006

Site notes
- Area: Beadon Street
- Governing body: Kolkata Municipal Corporation

Nimtala Crematorium is located on Beadon Street, Kolkata, India. The crematorium has been historically known as Nimtala burning ghat, or simply Nimtala ghat. Located on the banks of the Hoogly (Ganga) just like the Manikarnika Ghat in Varanasi; it is considered to be one of the holiest burning ghats in the country where the soul is said to attain moksha, ie. breaking the cycle of birth and death. So people across the country comes here for the cremation of their loved ones. It is also one of the largest burning ghats in India.

== History ==
The first building of this burning ghat came up in 1717, but cremation was done almost 2000 years before that time. The present structure of the ghat was created by Babu Rajchandra Das, for the citizens of Calcutta. Before the creation of Keoratola crematorium, it used to be the sole crematorium in the whole city. Feeling the need of the citizens Rajchandra constructed the ghat in 1817 after his father, Babu Pritaram Marh's demise.

In 2010 the central government of India upgraded the crematorium at a cost of INR ₹140 million (US$2.0 million). The last rites and cremation of "The Levitating Saint" Bhaduri Mahasaya - Maharshi Nagendranath Bhaduri were performed at Nimtala Burning Ghat in Kolkata on November 2, 1926.The Bengali polymath Rabindranath Tagore was cremated here in 1941. The Rabindranath Tagore Memorial in the crematorium compound was beautified as part of the 2010 project.

The ghat has also been represented in popular literature. It plays a significant part in the plot of the 2013 Kerala Sahitya Akademi Award winning Malayalam novel, Aarachaar, by K. R. Meera.

== Notable funerals ==
- Rani Rashmoni
- Iswar Chandra Vidyasagar
- Rajchandra Das
- Rabindranath Tagore
- Mutty Lall Seal
- Rajendralal Mitra
- Manik Bandopadhyay
- Samaresh Majumdar
- Sadhan Pande
- Sir Gurudas Banerjee
- Babu Preetoram Marh
- Debendranath Tagore
- Kadambari Devi
- Kadambini Ganguly
- Birendra Krishna Bhadra
- Bani Kumar
- Noti Binodini
- Dwijen Mukhopadhyay
- Ramdulal Sarkar
- Subhas Chakraborty
- Gostha Pal

== See also ==
- Keoratola crematorium
