= Rani Rashmoni =

Indian Zamindar and philanthropist (1793-1900)

Rani Rashmoni Das
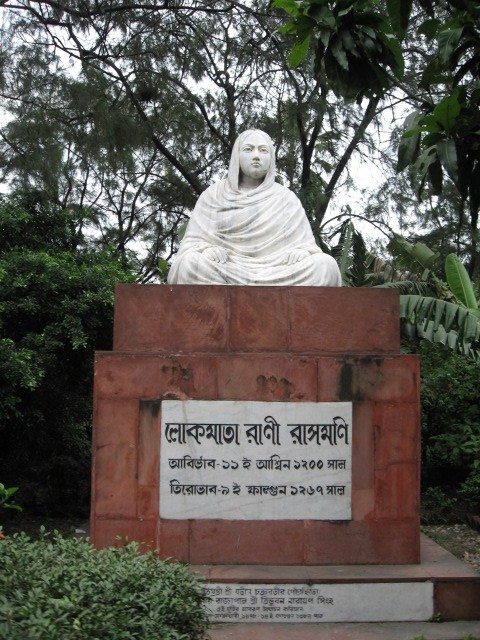
- Statue of Rani Rashmoni at Esplanade, Kolkata
- Born: 28 September 1793; Kona, Bengal Presidency
- Died: 19 February 1861 (aged 67); Kalighat Baganbari, Calcutta, Bengal Presidency, British India
- Other names: Rani Rashmoni, Lokmata
- Occupations: Social activist, Businessperson, Zamindar
- Known for: Founder of Dakshineshwar Kali Temple in Kolkata
- Spouse: Rajchandra Das (m. 1804; death 1836)
- Children: Padmamoni Das (Ata), Kumari Chowdhury, Karunamoyee Biswas, Jagadamba Biswas.
- Family: Janbazar Raj

Rashmoni Das, popularly known as Lokamata Rani Rashmoni, also spelled as Rani Rasmani, (Gregorian: 28 September 1793 – 19 February 1861, Bengali: 11 Ashwina 1200 – 9 Phalguna 1267), was an Indian businesswoman, entrepreneur, Zamindar, philanthropist and the founder of the Dakshineswar Kali Temple in Kolkata. She remained closely associated with Sri Ramakrishna Paramhansa after she appointed him as the priest of the Dakshineswar temple. She was also one of the earliest social reformers in early nineteenth-century Bengal and was one of the forerunners of the Bengal Renaissance. Besides, she also led many of the resistances against the encroaching British administration and their presence in all walks of colonial society in the Bengal province. Her other construction works include the construction of a road from Subarnarekha River to Puri for the pilgrims, Babughat (also known as Babu Rajchandra Das Ghat), Ahiritola Ghat and Nimtala ghat for the everyday bathers at the Ganges. She also offered considerable charity to the Imperial Library (now the National Library of India), and the Hindu College (now Presidency University).

Presently, the Lokmata Rani Rashmoni Mission is situated at Nimpith, South 24 Parganas, West Bengal, 743338, India.

== Biography ==
Rashmoni was born on 28 September 1793 at 'Kona' village, Kumarhatta-Kanchanpalli (present-day Nadia-North 24 Parganas border) in a Mahishya peasant family of Harekrishna Das. Her father had learned as much as he could in his youth, so by his old days he could read the Krittivasi Ramayan and the Kashidasi Mahabharata, and even knew a little about market calculations. Again, Hare Krishna knew the work of house construction very well. Because of this, Rashmoni's father was well known in Halisahar and nearby villages. When he got some free time, he used to read Ramayana or Mahabharata. Everyone adored Rashmoni's father as he could recite the Ramayana beautifully. Her mother Rampriya Debi died when she was just seven years old. She was married to Babu Rajchandra Das (Marh) of Janbazar, Kolkata, a member of a wealthy Mahishya zamindar family called the Janbazar Raj, when she was eleven years old. They had four daughters.

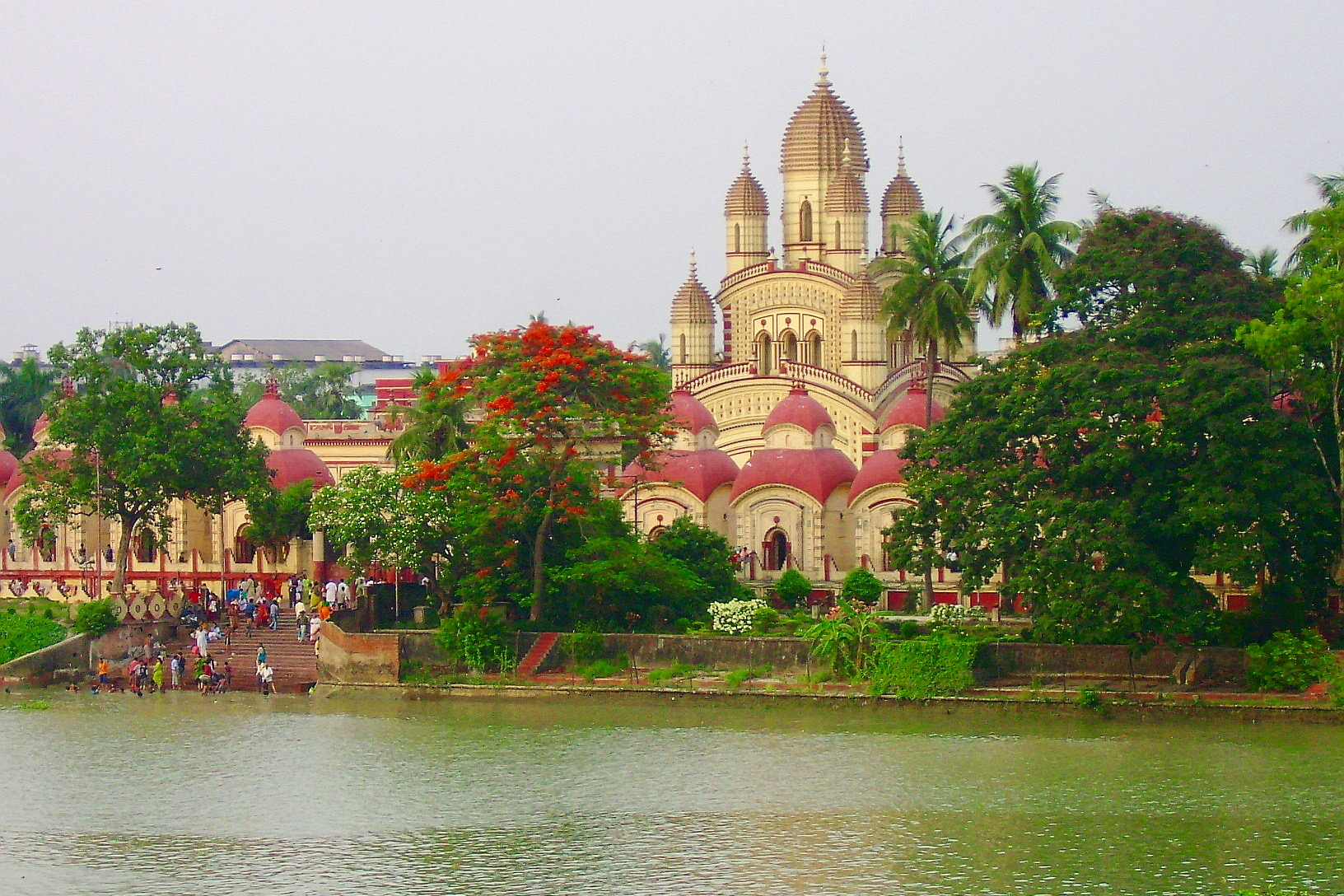
Dakshineswar Kali Temple, built by Rani Rashmoni in 1855

After her husband's death in 1836, Rashmoni assumed responsibility of the zamindari and finances.

After inheriting property from her husband, she managed to endear herself to the people through her management skills of the estate and her many charitable works in the city. She was well loved and revered by the people and proved herself to be worthy of the title, "Rani".

The Rani had clashes with the British in India. By blocking the shipping trade on a part of the Ganges she compelled the British to abolish the tax imposed on fishing in the river, which threatened the livelihood of fishermen. When Puja processions were stopped by the British on the charge that they disturbed the peace, she defied the orders. The British withdrew the penalty imposed on her.

She tacitly supported social activist/scholar Ishwar Chandra Vidyasagar's campaign for widow remarriage. She even submitted a draft bill against polygamy to the East India Company, who handled the administration during those days.

The Eden Gardens (then Marh Bagan) was also a part of their Zamindari area, which they later gifted to the Eden sisters of Lord Auckland, the then Governor-General of India, as they helped him in saving life of Babu's 3rd daughter from a fatal disease.

The Rani also had to her credit numerous charitable works and other contributions to society. She oversaw the construction of a road from Subarnarekha river to Puri for pilgrims. She funded the construction of ghats such as Babughat (in memory of her husband), Ahiritola Ghat and Nimtala Ghat for the daily bathers in the Ganges. Rashmoni also donated to the then Imperial Library (now the National Library of India) and Hindu College (now Presidency University). Prince Dwarkanath Tagore had mortgaged a part of his Zamindari in now South 24 Parganas (part of present-day Santoshpur and adjoining areas) to Rashmoni for his passage to England. This part of land which was then a part of the Sunderbans was marshy and almost uninhabitable except for some families of thugs who found the area convenient to stay and venture out for plunders in far away places mounted on stilts. Rashmoni persuaded these families and helped them to build up fisheries in the surrounding water bodies that later turned into large, rich bheris. They gradually gave up their profession of plundering and transformed into a community of fishermen.

Profoundly affected by a dream to build a temple of Goddess Kali, Rani looked for and purchased a 30,000-acre plot in the village of Dakhineswar. The large temple complex was built between 1847 and 1855. The 20-acre (81,000 m^{2}) plot was bought from an Englishman, Jake Hastie, and was then popularly known as Saheban Bagicha. It took eight years and nine hundred thousand rupees to complete the construction. The idol of Goddess Kali was installed on the Snana Yatra day on 31 May 1855 amid festivities at the temple formerly known as Sri Sri Jagadishwari Kali, with Ramkumar Chhattopadhyay as the head priest. Soon his younger brother Gadai or Gadadhar (later known as Ramakrishna) moved in and so did his nephew Hriday to assist him.

Rani Rashmoni's House at Janbazar was venue of traditional Durga Puja celebration each autumn. This included traditional pomp, including all-night jatras (folk theatre), rather than by entertainment for the Englishmen with whom she carried on a running feud. After her death in 1861, her sons-in-law took to celebrating Durga Puja in their respective premises.

Being an ardent devotee of the Goddess Kali, "Sri Rasmani Dasi, longing for the Feet of Kali " were the words engraved in the official seal of her estate.

== In popular culture ==
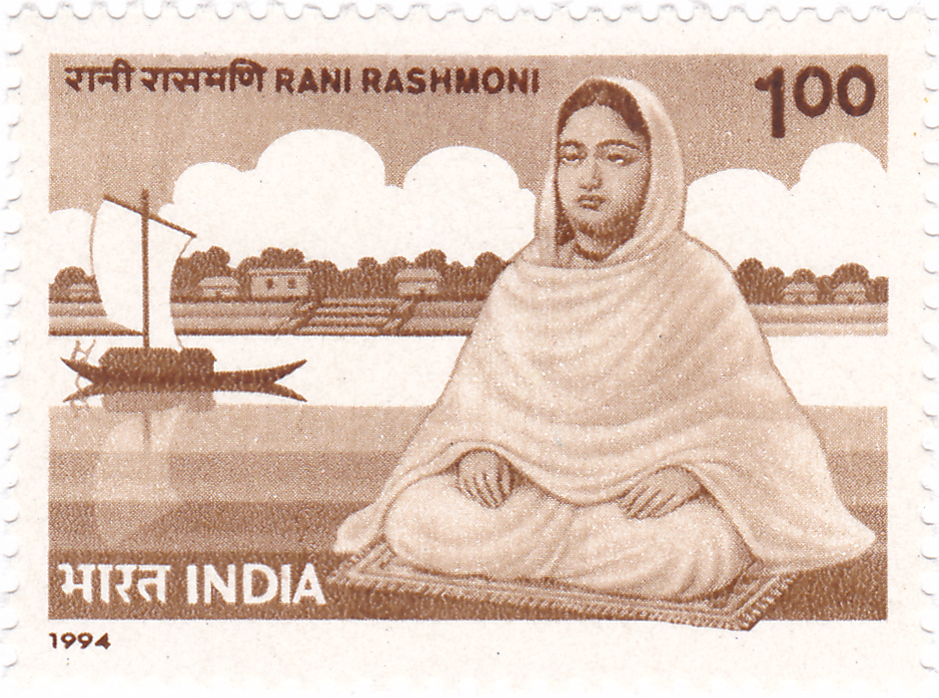
Rani Rashmoni on a 1994 stamp of India

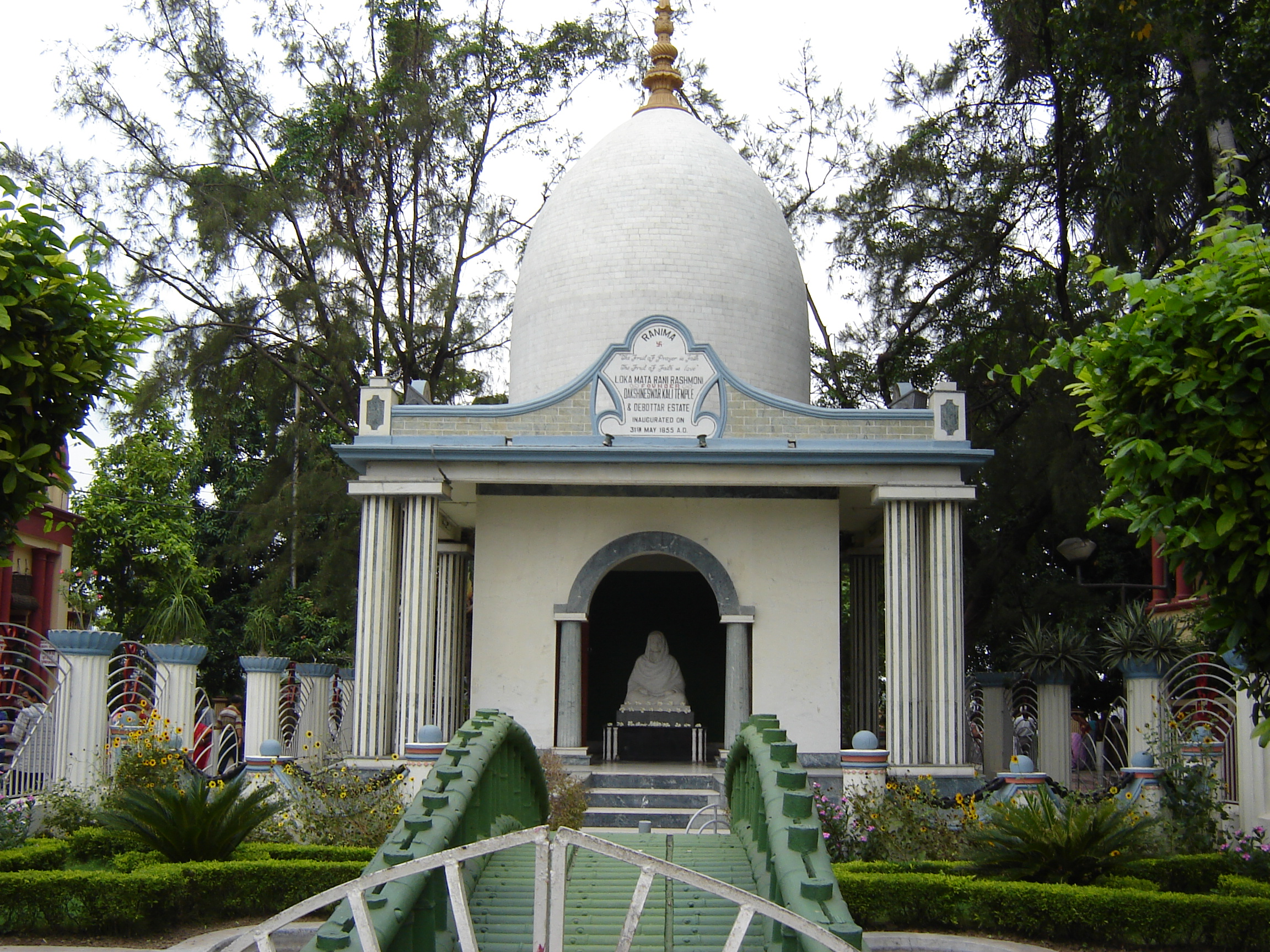
Shrine dedicated to Rani Rashmoni within the precincts of Dakshineswar Kali Temple

Rani Rashmoni has also been subject of a biographical film in Bengali language, titled Rani Rasmani (film) (1955), directed by Kaliprasad Ghosh, and wherein lead played by famous theatre personality and actress Molina Devi.

Zee Bangla also featured a daily soap depicting the life of the illustrious Rani, Karunamoyee Rani Rashmoni, which premiered on 24 July 2017 and was telecasted daily till 13 February 2022.

== Monuments ==
- An avenue in Esplanade, Kolkata is named after her as Rani Rashmoni Avenue, where her statue is also located.
- A road is named after her as Rani Rashmoni Road near her ancestral house at Janbazar, Kolkata.
- A road is named after her as Rani Rashmoni Road at Dakshineshwar.
- The Department of Post of Government of India issued a postage stamp to memorialize the bicentennial of Rani Rashmoni in 1993
- A Ferry Ghat known as Rani Rashmoni Ghat has been built for ferry services in Barrackpore, West Bengal and in Hooghly, West Bengal (just after the Hooghly District Correctional Home)
- One of the 5, Rani Abbakka-class patrol vessels of Indian Coast Guard has been named after Rani Rashmoni. It was commissioned in June 2018 and will be based in Visakhapatnam (indigenously built by Hindustan Shipyard).

== Gallery ==
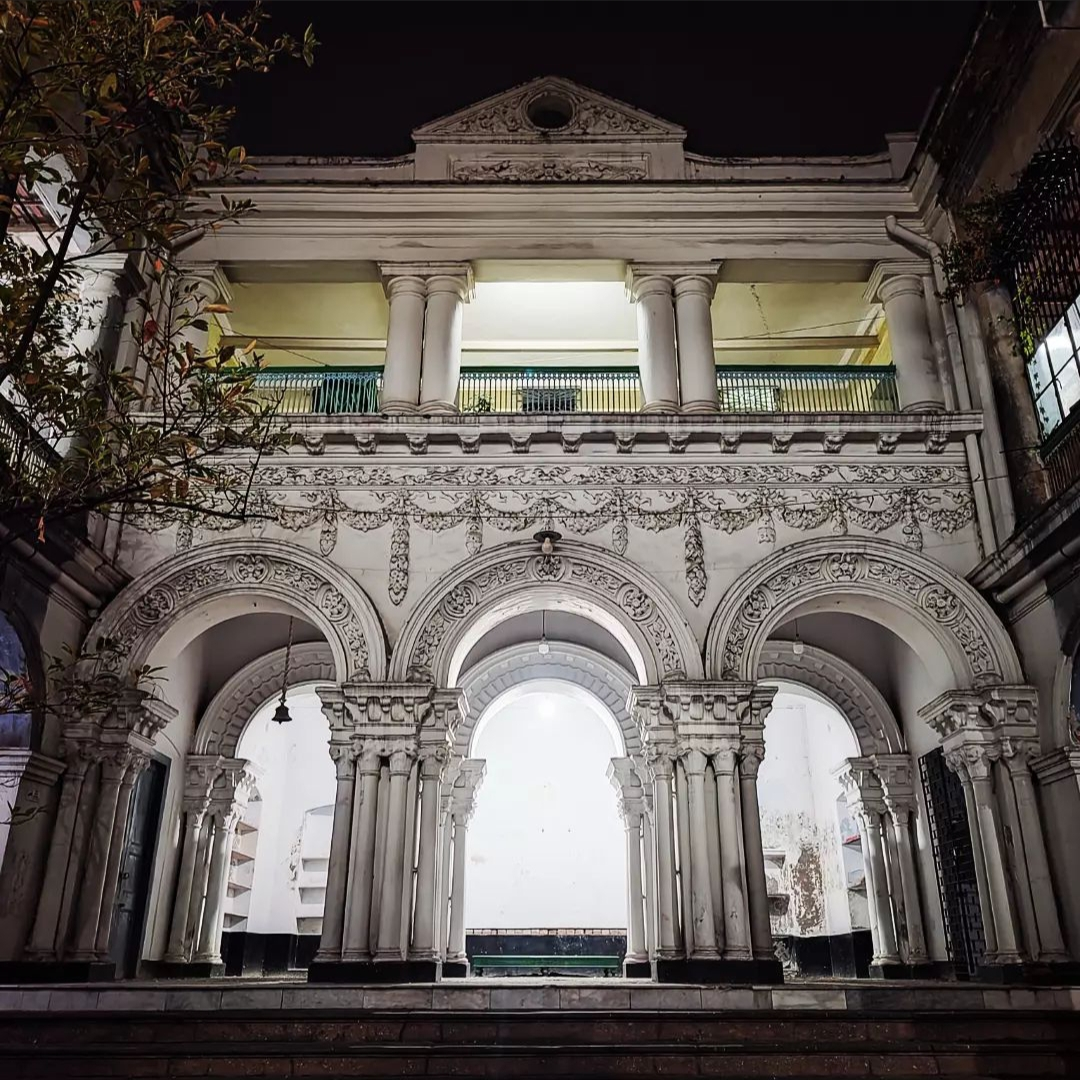
Rani Rashmoni's palace in Janbazar, Kolkata.

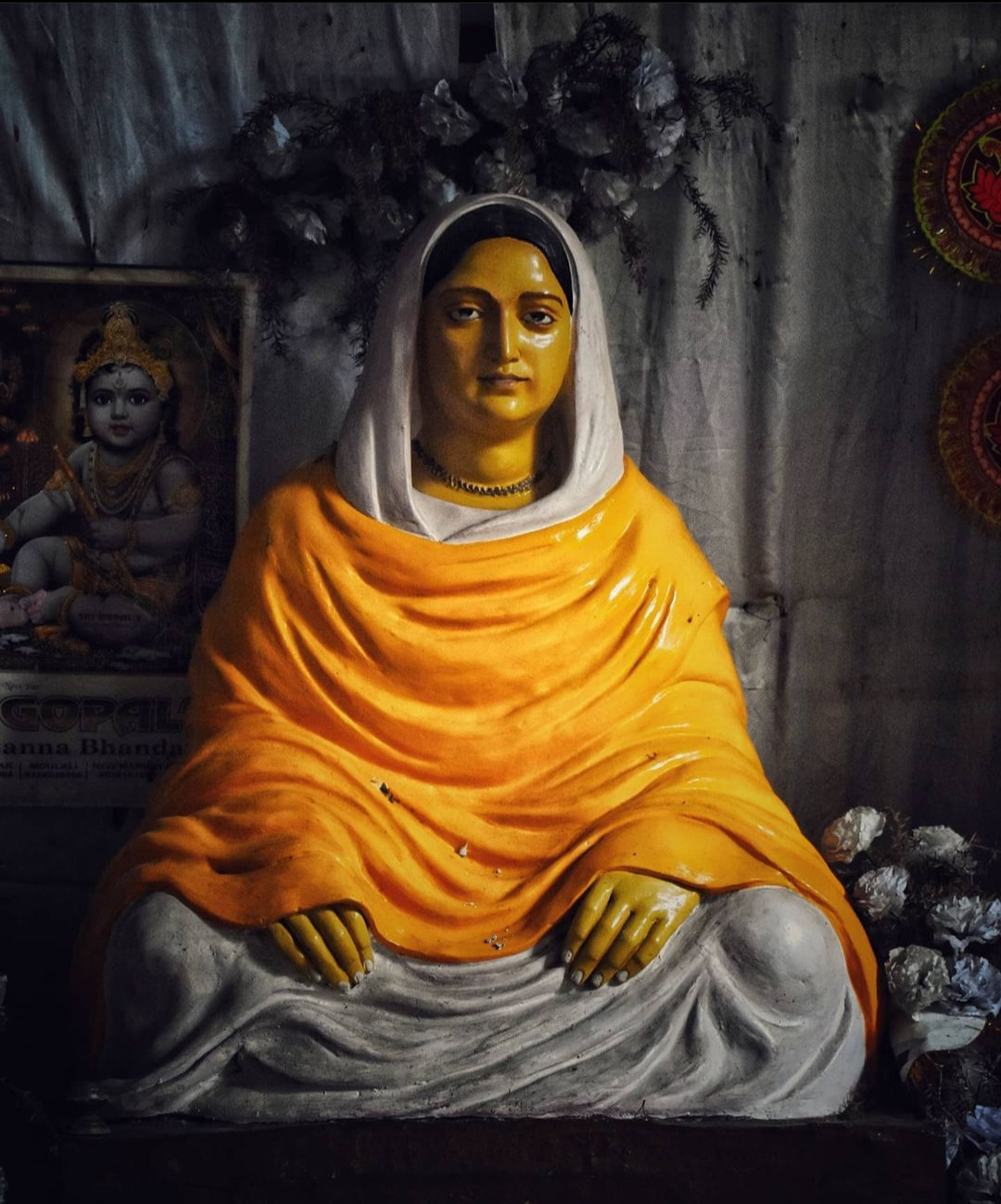
Sculpture of Rani Rashmoni at her palace.

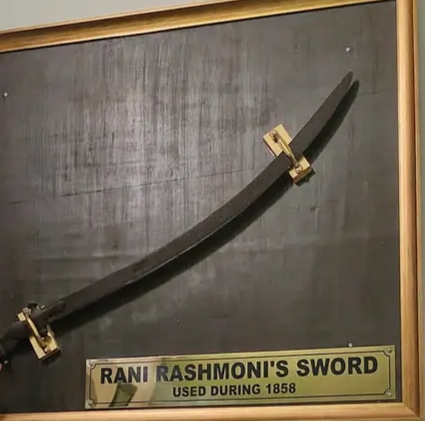
Rani Rashmoni's sword used in 1858.

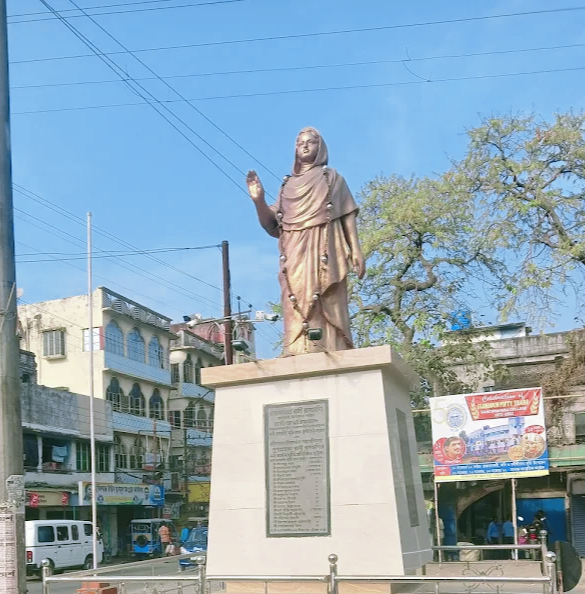
Statue of Rani Rashmoni near her birthplace, Bagmore, Halishahar, North 24 Parganas.

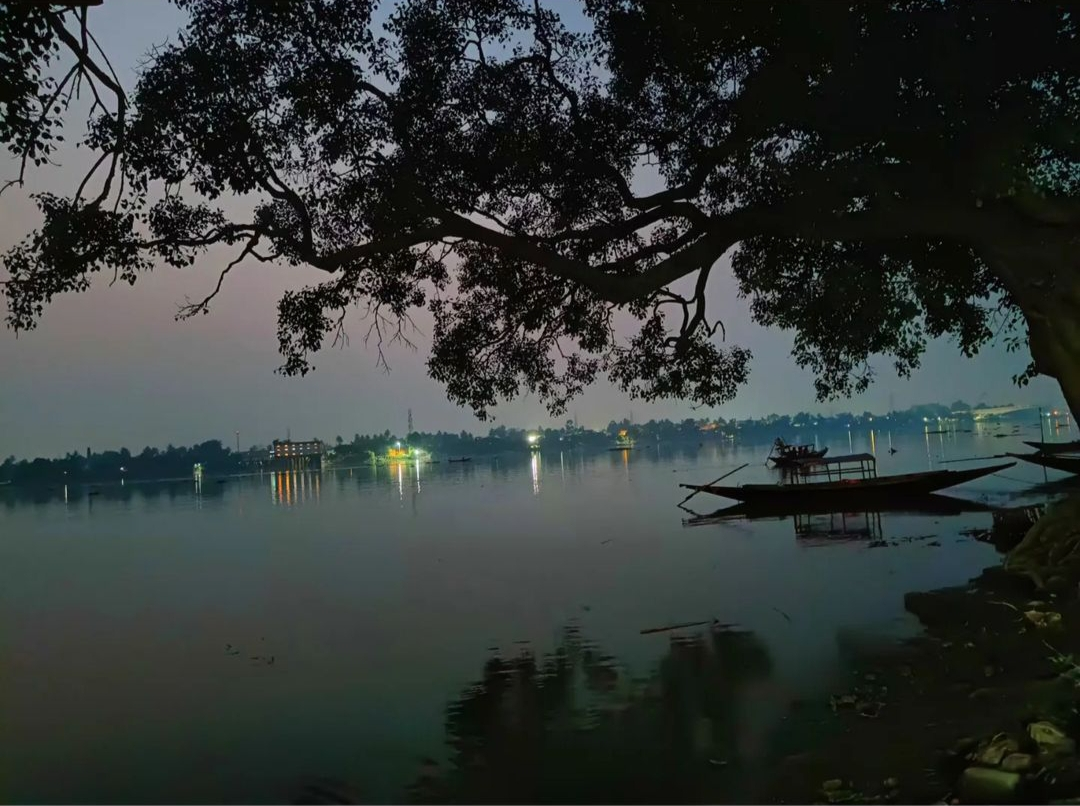
Rani Rashmoni ghat near her birthplace, now at CharNandanbati, Kalyani thana, Nadia.

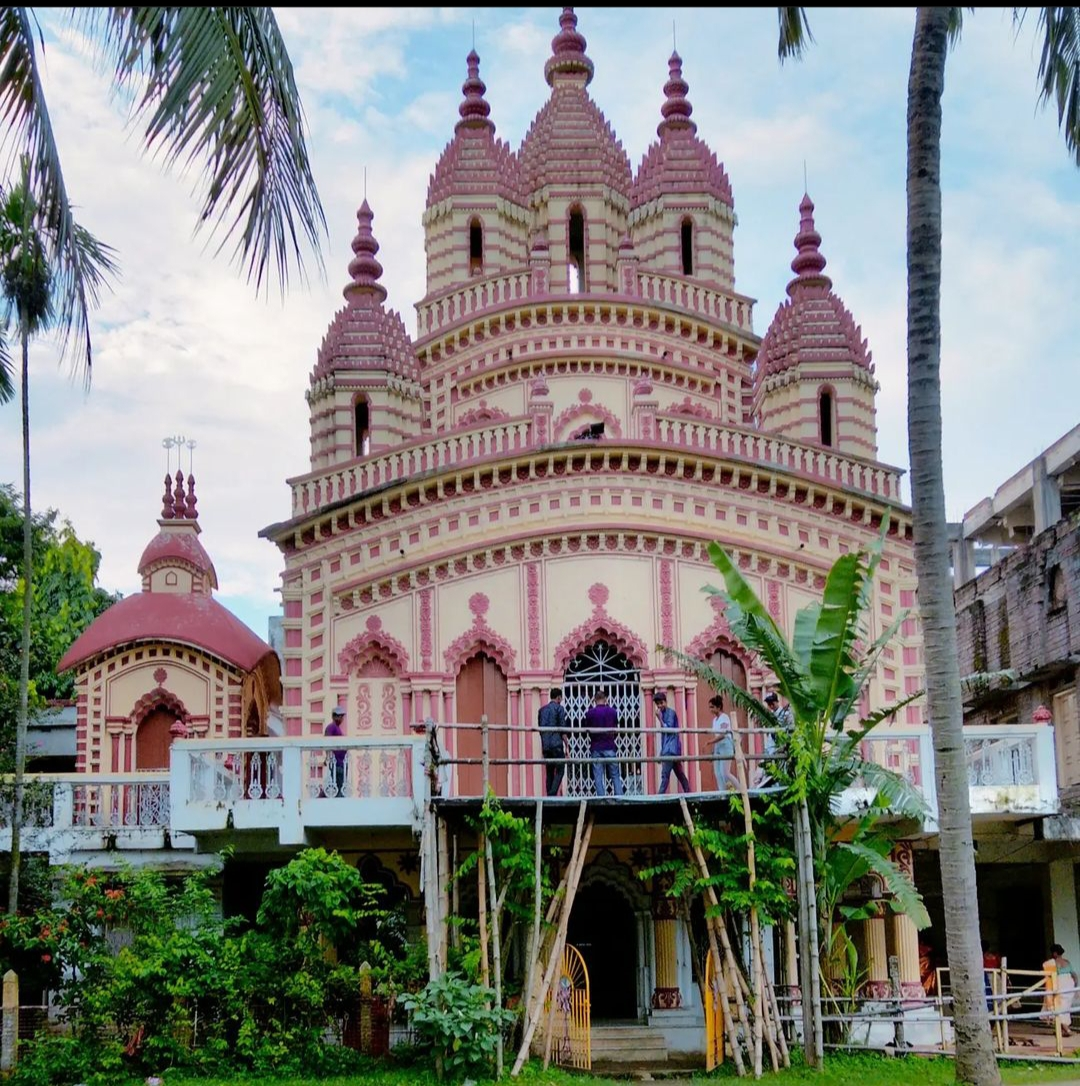
A temple which resembles Dakshineswar Kali temple near Rani Rashmoni's birthplace, Kalyani thana, Nadia.

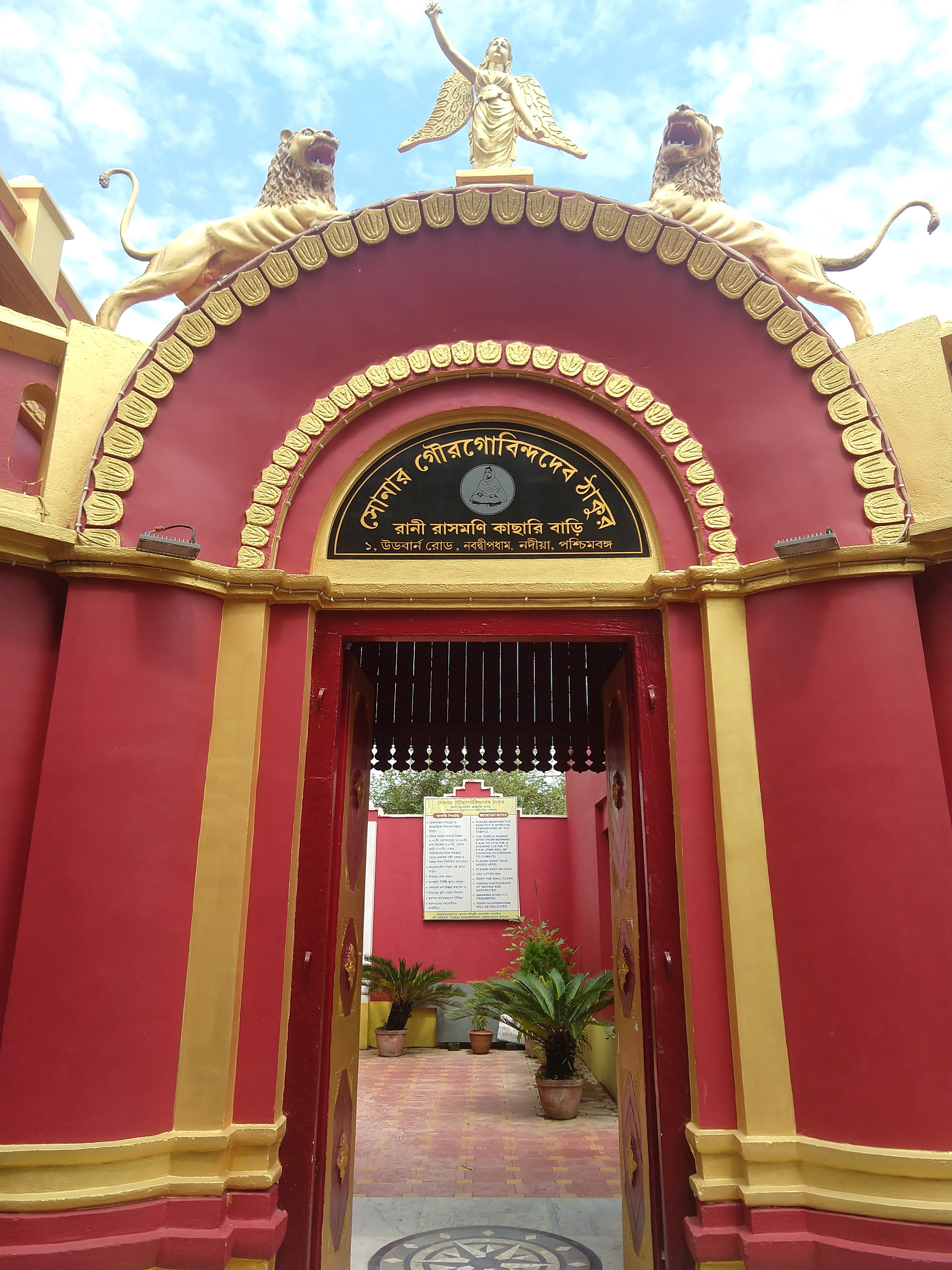
Front view of the entrance gate of Rani Rashmoni Kachari Bari. In 1852, when the Nadia royal family could not retain the zamindari of Nabadwip, Rani Rasmoni bought the zamindari of Nabadwip. She then built this kachari house in Nabadwip to manage the zamindari of Nabadwip. There are temples of Radha Govinda Jiu and Gouranga Jiu served by Rani Rasmoni.

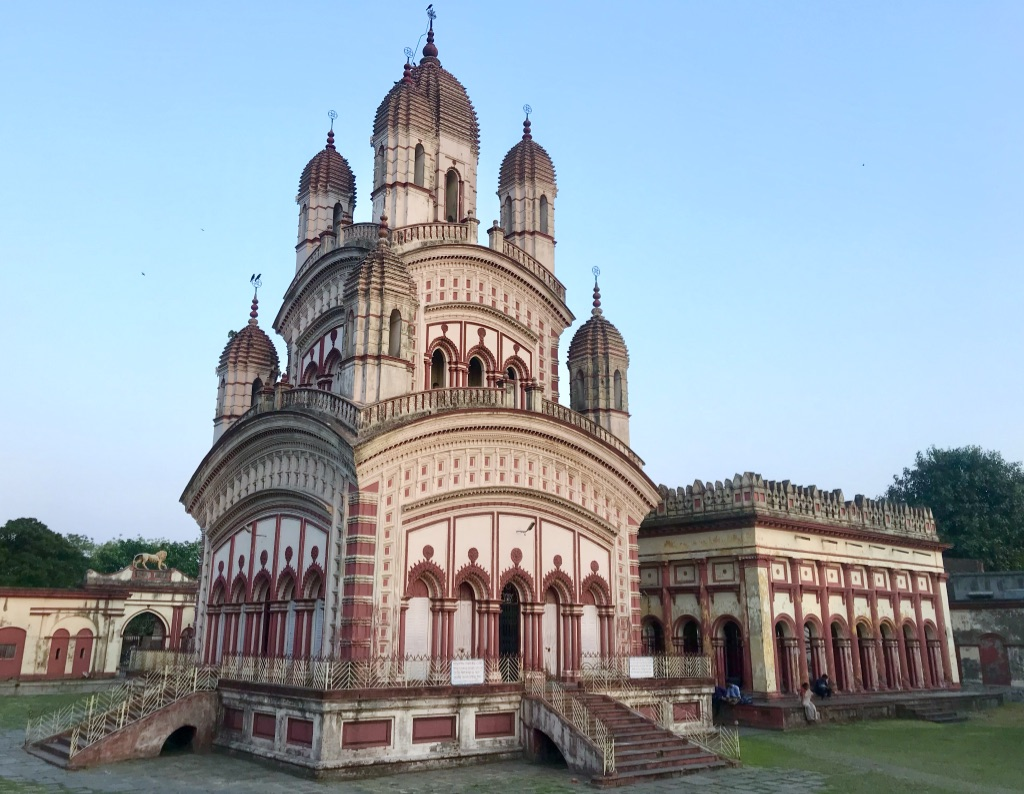
The famous Annapurna Temple, Titagarh of Barrackpore of North 24 Parganas. It was built by her youngest daughter, Jagadamba and her son in law Babu Mathurmohan Biswas. This temple resembles the famous Dakshineswar Temple.

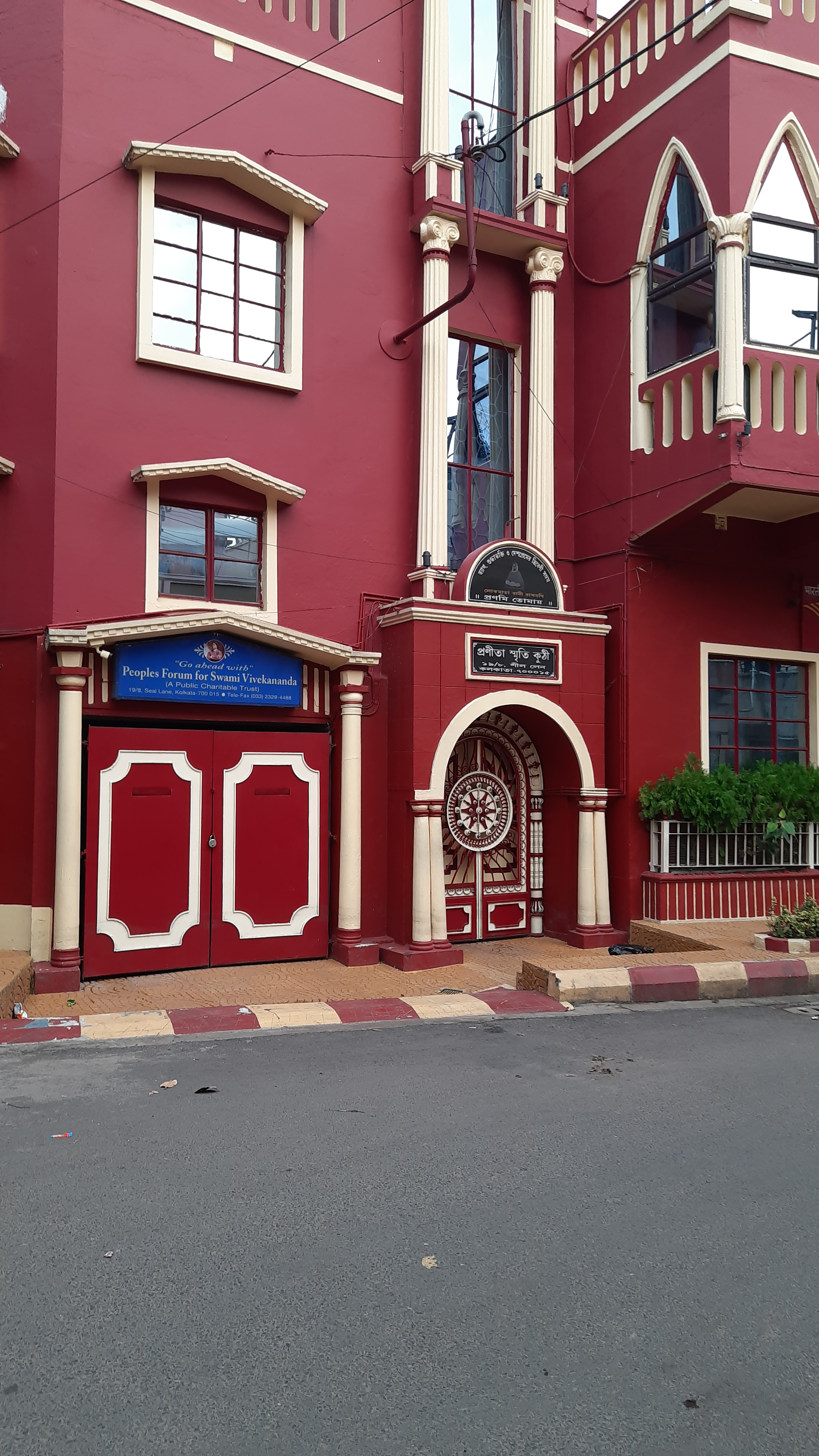
The heritage house of freedom fighter Pronita Devi. She fought against the British with the assistance and guidance of Rani Rashmoni.

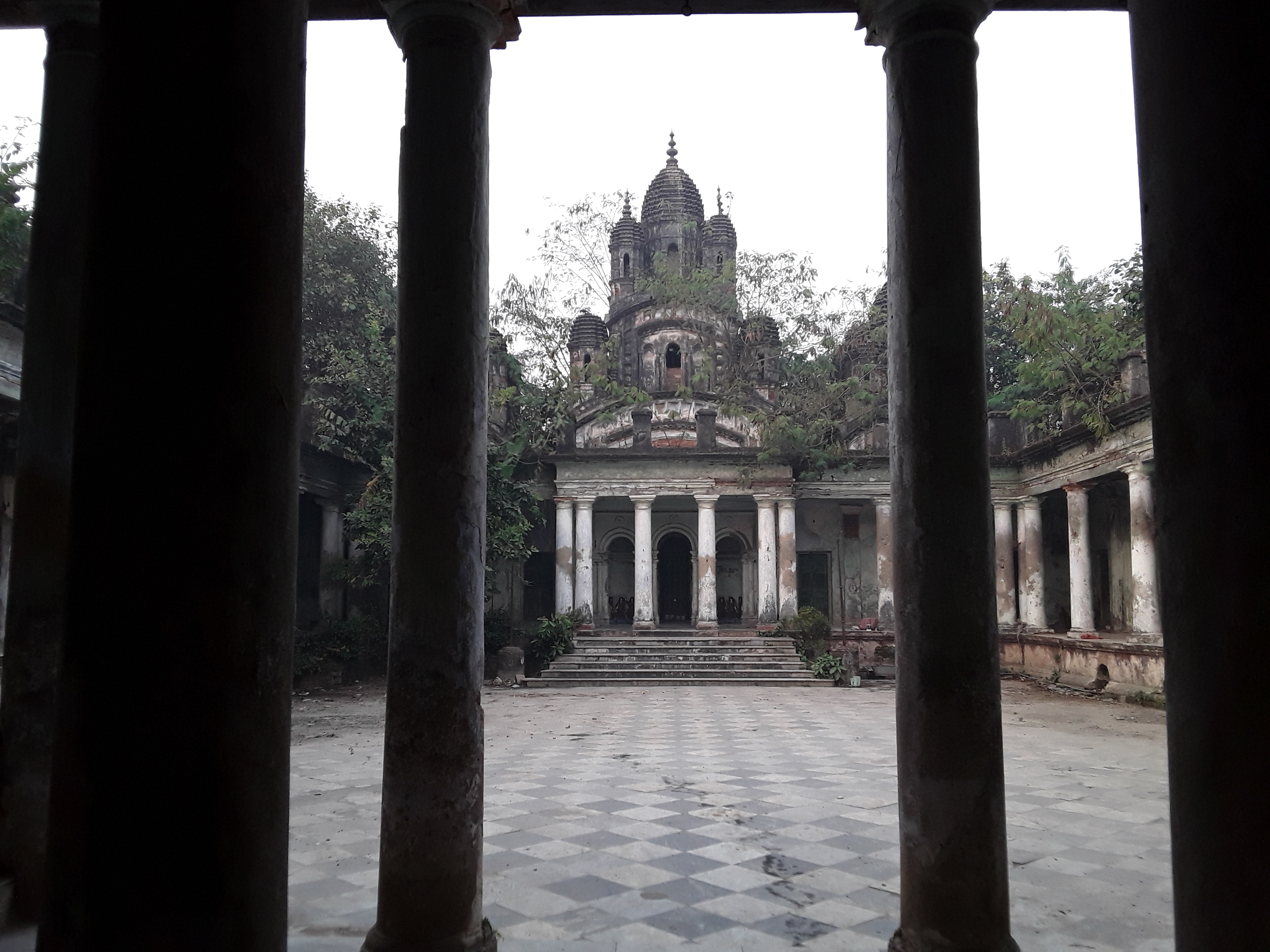
Chhoto Rashbari of Bawali Mondal family in Tollygunge. Rani Rashmoni's Dakshineswar Kali temple was inspired by the Navaratna styled Radhakanta temple of Tollygunge.

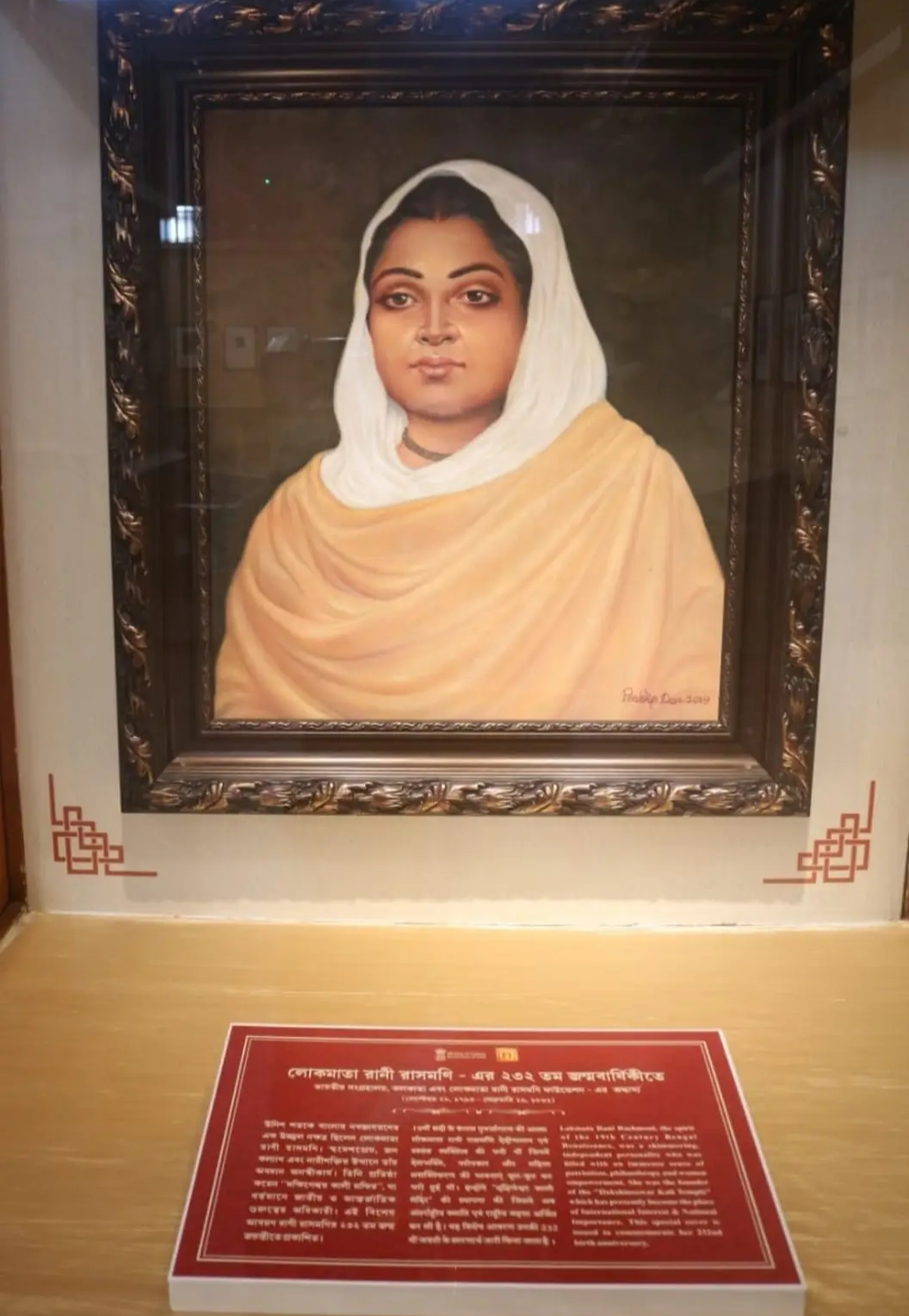
Lokmata Rani Rashmoni's portrait was unveiled at the Indian Museum on the occasion of her 232nd birthday.

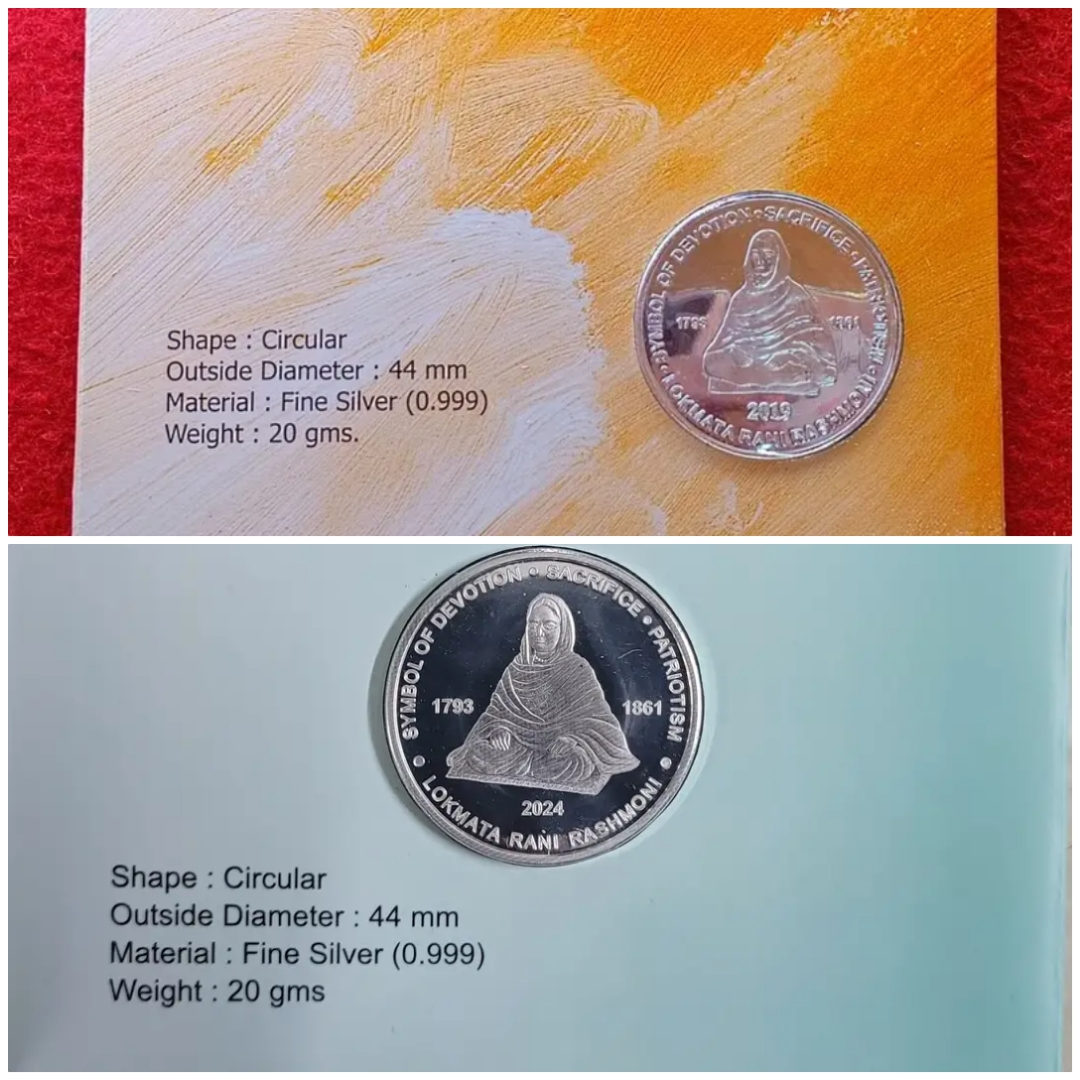
Souvenir Silver Coins released by India Government Mint, Kolkata to mark Rani Rashmoni's birthday in 2019(up) and 2024 respectively.

== See also ==
- Rani Rashmoni Green University
- Janbazar Raj
- Rajchandra Das
- Dakshineswar Temple
