= Zamindari Association =

Zamindars in India

The Zamindari Association was an association of zamindars in India. It was later renamed to Landholders' Society.

== History ==
The Zamindari Association was formed in March 1838 as a political organization for zamindars. The founders of the association were prominent zamindars of Bengal; such as Dwarkanath Tagore, Rajchandra Das, Prasanna Kumar Tagore, Radhakanta Deb, Bhabani Charan Bandyopadhyay, and Ramkamal Sen.

The association campaigned for Permanent Settlement to be implemented all over India. It also maintained close ties with the British India Society in London. It was able to secure concession from the British that allowed tax exemption status to temples and lands for Brahmans. British citizens in India were allowed to become members of the association.

The society did not expand outside of Bengal due to the lack of implementation of the Permanent Settlement outside of India. It started declining from 1842 and closed in 1850. It and the Bengal British India Society were merged into the British Indian Association.
