= Rajchandra Das =

Indian Zamindar, businessman and philanthropist (1787–1836)

Raja Rai Bahadur Raj Chandra Das
- Born: 11 May 1787; Calcutta, Bengal, Company rule in India
- Died: 9 June 1836 (aged 49); Calcutta, Bengal, Company rule in India
- Citizenship: Indian
- Occupations: Businessman, Zaminder, Merchant, Social reformer
- Title: Raja of Janbazar Raj
- Spouse: Rani Rashmoni (m. 1804–1836)
- Children: Padmamoni Das, Kumari Chowdhury, Karunamoyee Biswas, Jagadamba Biswas
- Parent: Babu Preetoram Marh (father) Jogmaya Debi (mother)
- Family: Janbazar royal family

Babu Rai Raja Raj Chandra Das Bahadur (also spelt as Raj Chunder Dass or written as Rajchandra Marh; 1787 – June 9, 1836), was an Indian Zamindar, merchant, businessman and a Philanthropist. He was a scion of the famous Marh family of Janbazar. He donated large parts of his wealth to charity, education and social reform. Through his contributions, he became one of the icons of Bengal Renaissance. As a mark of charity and welfare of society, he built the Babu Ghat and the Nimtala Ghat.

== Ancestry ==
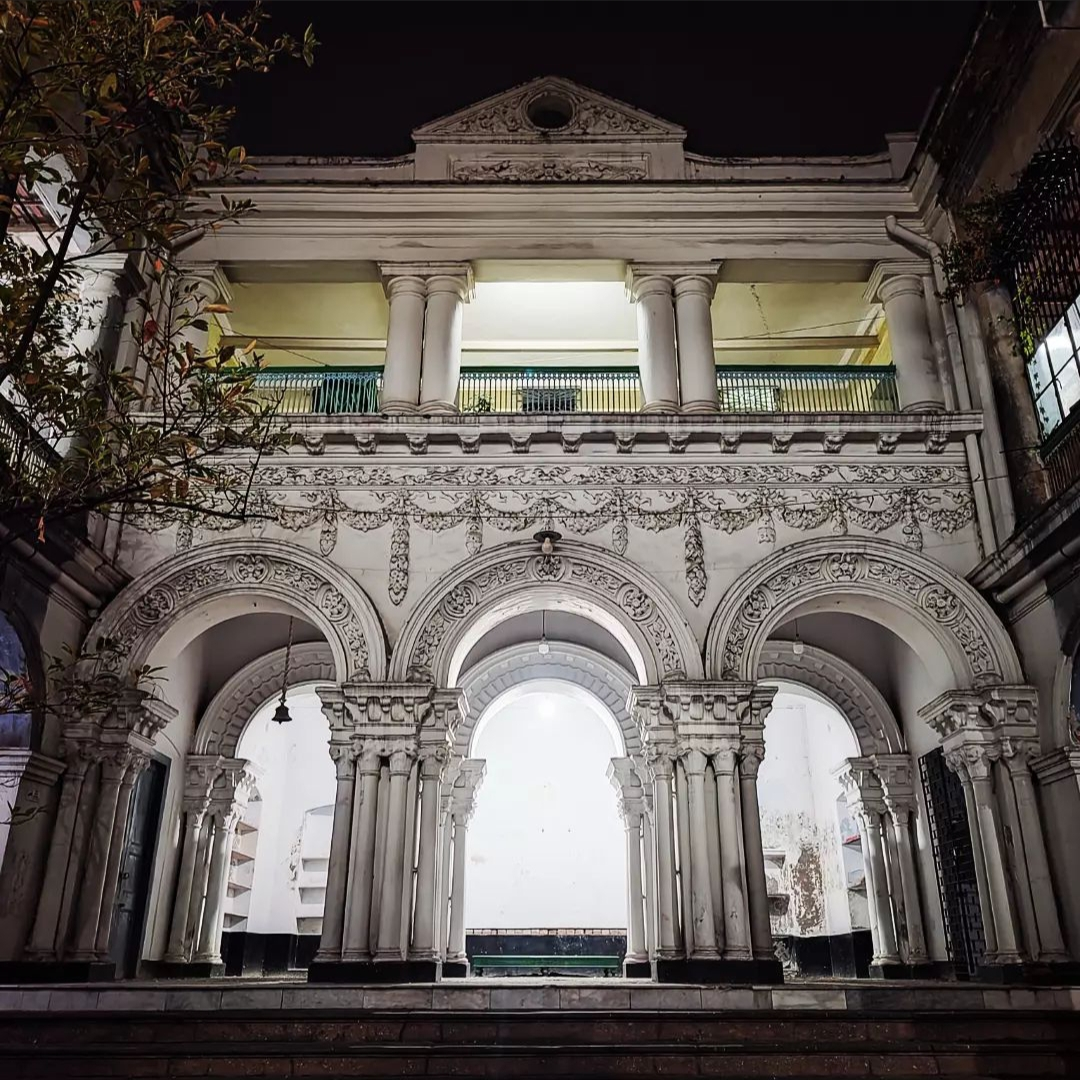
The house of the Marh family at Janbazar

He was born into an opulent Mahishya family to Babu Preetoram Marh and Jogmaya Devi. The members of the Janbazar Raj family. They rose from a very ordinary economic circumstances to the level of landlordism. The earliest known ancestor of the family was Bijoyram Koley, Kantoram Marh's father and Rajchandra's great-great-grandfather. He is said to be a resident of Sonatikhali village, under the Raja of Burdwan. His descendants are said to have migrated further south to Howrah district. Rajchandra's great-grandfather Kantoram was a bamboo trader by profession and therefore, he received the title "Marh". His son was Krishnaram and in turn, Krishnaram's son was Preetoram Marh. Preetoram worked in the customs house. He also brought many Zamindaris and started an export business, becoming one of the premier merchants and one of the foremost Zamindars of Calcutta. The Marh family was Mahishya by caste and not originally from Calcutta. They originally lived in Khosalpur village in Howrah. Krishnaram's sister Bindubala Dasi was married to Akrur Manna of the Manna family, the then landlords of Janbazar, Kolkata. After his aunt's marriage and his mother's untimely demise, Preetoram along with his father Krishna Ram and his two brothers, Rantanu and Kalicharan, came to live in his aunt's house to learn trade and to receive a formal education. Gradually, the Marh family's relationship with the Manna family became stronger. Preetoram married Jogmaya Debi, the daughter of the Jugal Kishore Manna, the younger brother of Akrur Manna. In that marriage in 1777, he received a dowry of several houses in Janbazar and 16 bighas of land. His eldest son, Harachandra died early and therefore, Rajchandra naturally became his legal heir.

== Early life ==
Rajchandra was born on 1783, on a day of Purnima to Babu Preetoram Marh, one of the wealthiest merchants of Calcutta of the time, and the founder of the Janbazar Raj, and Jogmaya Debi. As the second eldest child, he received the undivided attention of his parents. Different tutors were appointed by Preetoram for his education and he was described by his teachers as a "fast learner". He received a formal education consisting of various languages, such as the Persian language and Sanskrit and subjects such as Mathematics, Trade, Business, History, Sciences and other contemporary essential subjects. Apart from his native Bengali, he was also fluent in languages such as Sanskrit, English and Persian.

After, the sudden demise of his elder brother Harachandra, he firmly took over the reins of business from his father and worked diligently in expanding it. He bought huge tracts of land in the districts of Nadia, Hooghly, Howrah district, South 24 Parganas and North 24 Parganas, Jessore, Dhaka (especially in Gopalganj District which was even renamed after one of his grandsons) and even in some parts of Odisha.

== Marriages ==
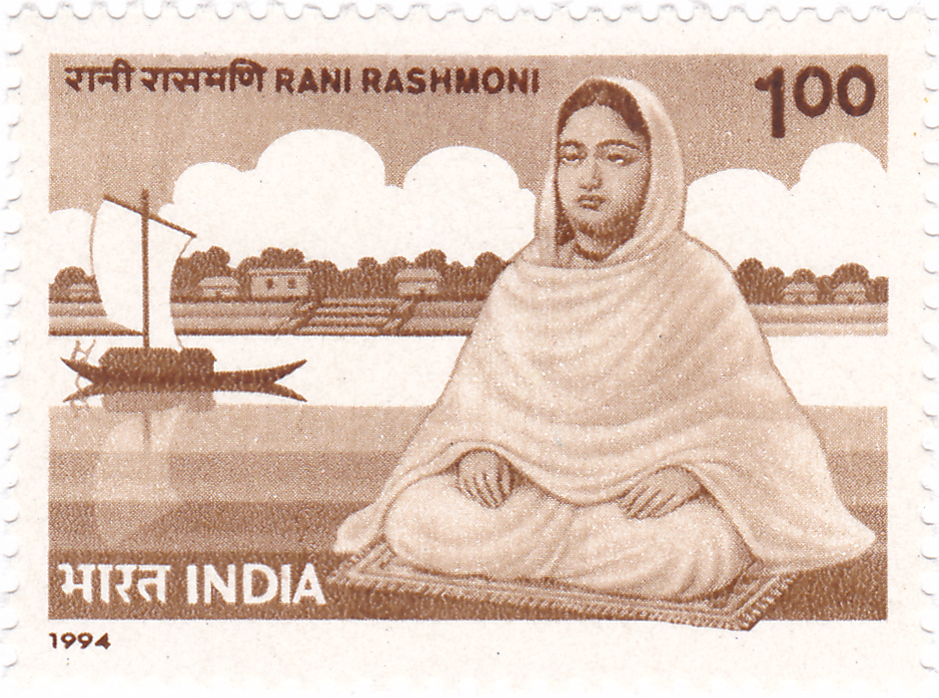
Rani Rashmoni on a postal stamp by the Government of India

Rajchandra was surpassed in terms of work by his wife Rani Rashmoni. However, this distinguished Bengali of the 18th century is now known by his wife. Rajchandra married twice before marrying Rani Rashmoni, but unfortunately both his wives died within a year of their respective marriages. After the untimely death of his first two wives, Rajchandra married Rashmoni in 1804. Rashmoni was affectionately called 'Rani' by her mother. Later, the title 'Rani' remained next to her name in her work records forever. After her husband's death, the wealth of the zamindari passed to Rashmoni. Over time, she rose from 'Zamidarginni' to the status of 'Rani' in the literal sense.

== Business life ==
Rajchandra became the representative of the English Kelvin Company. He got involved in the export business. He exported tasar, mriganavi, indigo, etc. to England. Through the British Kelvin Company, all those products were distributed in the English market. Along with export trade, Rajchandra got involved in the stock exchange business. He bought the Beleghata region with a large amount of cash. In the stockbroking business, he bought paddy, jute, rice, jaggery, moong, lentils, copper, etc. at low prices and sold them at high prices, making money like water. Rajchandra bought the entire area including today's Dharmatala, Free School Street, New Market, Rashmoni Square in Kolkata. He realised that the British East India Company would not leave India easily, they were settled in Kolkata. The far-sighted businessman Rajchandra was able to sense this and quickly bought all the land around the Maidan. He also started buying houses in the Sahebs' neighborhood. After buying the best lands in South Kolkata, Rajchandra became the largest landowner in Kolkata. He became the principal Zamindar of Kolkata. He was welcomed by Dwarkanath Tagore to be one of the founding members of the Bengal landholders Association.

Building of the Janbazar Palace

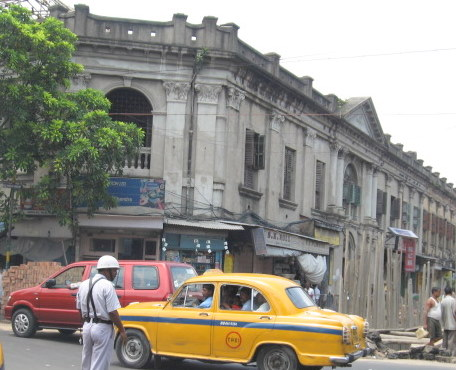
Janbazar Palace

In 1813, Rajchandra completed the construction of the palace started by Pritiram on six bighas of land. This palace of three hundred rooms has six courtyards, a lake. Seven mahals, Thakurdalan, Natmandir, Dewankhana, Kachari Ghar, Guest house, Goyal Ghar, armory, and rooms for the guards and dewans. This palace, adjacent to the Janbazar palace, was built at a cost of twenty-five lakh Mohurs.

Beleghata Property dispute

Rajchandra's Beleghata Property did not have a drainage system. It is necessary to cut a canal and provide drainage. There is also no bridge across the public road. Rajchandra cut a canal and built a bridge. Since the British company did not have occupation in Beleghata, they did not needed to take permission. However, Rajchandra imposed a condition on the government that the government would not be able to collect any toll from the public for the bridge. The government was forced to accept the condition.

== Contributions ==
Construction of the Babu Ghat

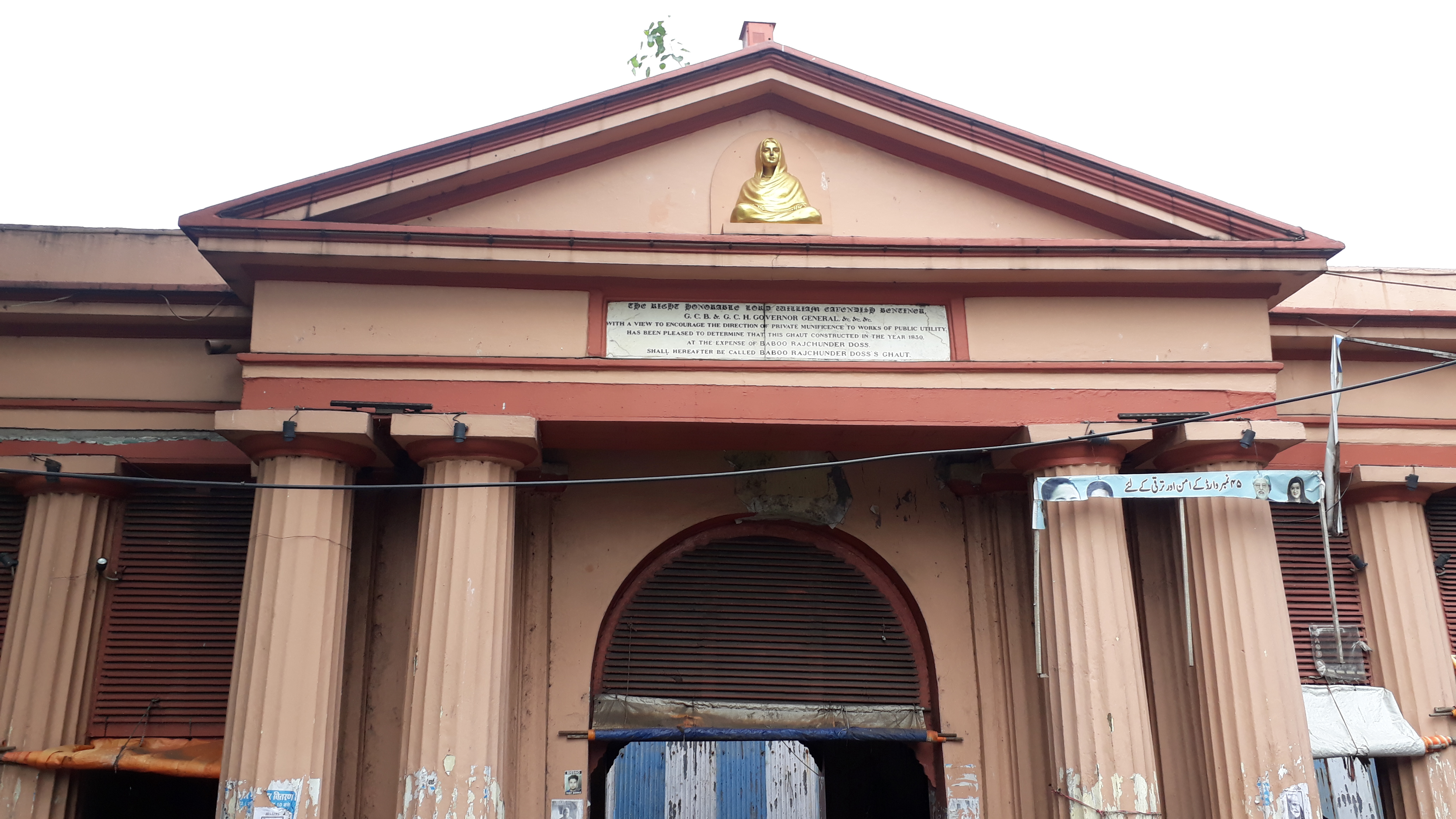
Babu Ghat

The then rich people of Calcutta used to build bathing ghats as a mark of wealth. On the other side of the Hooghly River to establish his status Raj Chandra started building a ghat on the other side of the Ganges in competition with them. After obtaining the permission of the company, he first built a ghat on the other side of the river. He built a ghat with thirty-six pillars. A covering over the pillars. Separate arrangements for men and women for bathing. Lord Bentinck's proclamation named it 'Babu Rajchandra Das's Ghat'. It is still popularly known as 'Babu Ghat'.

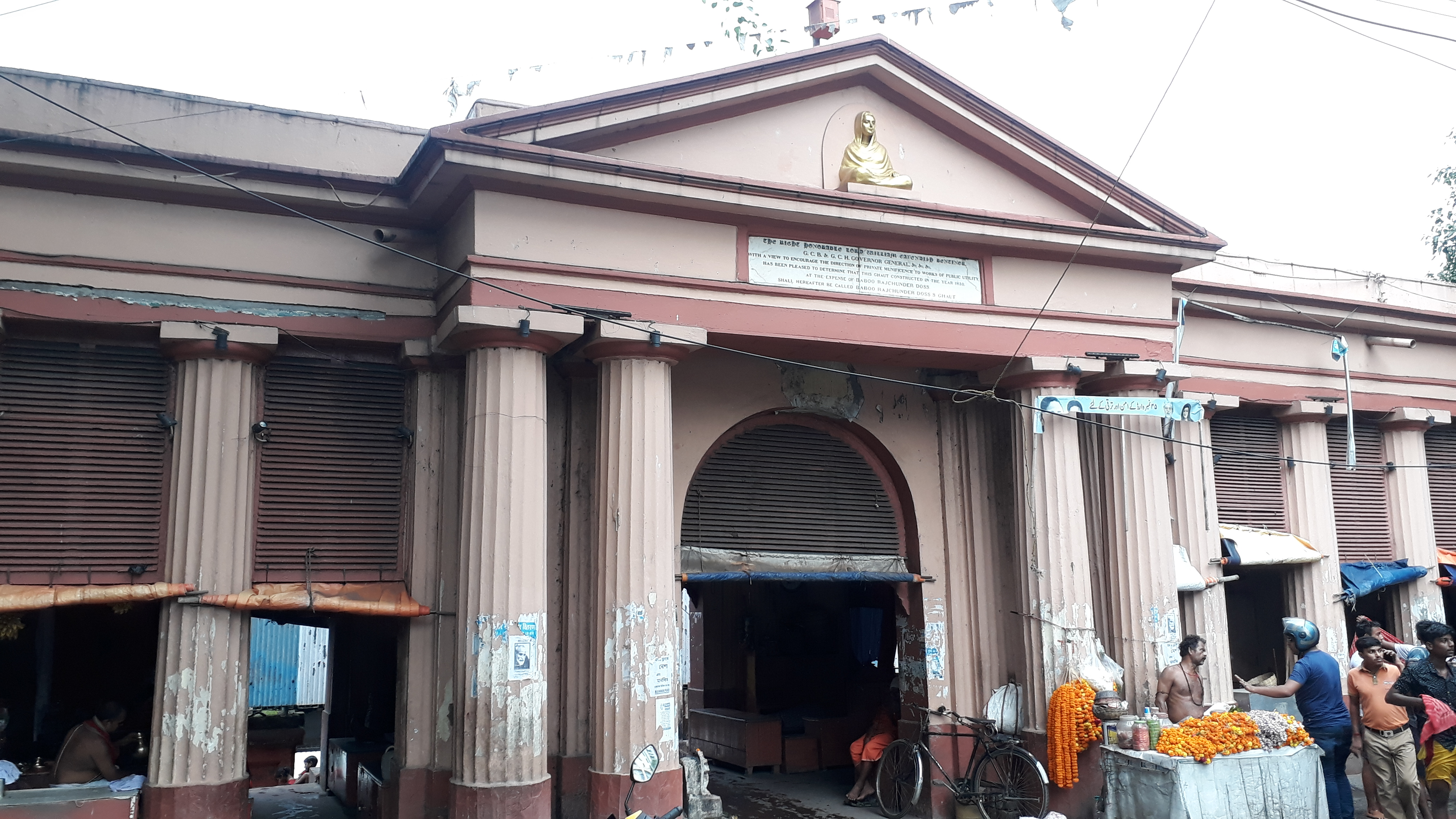
Built in 1815

Building of the Ahiritala Ghat

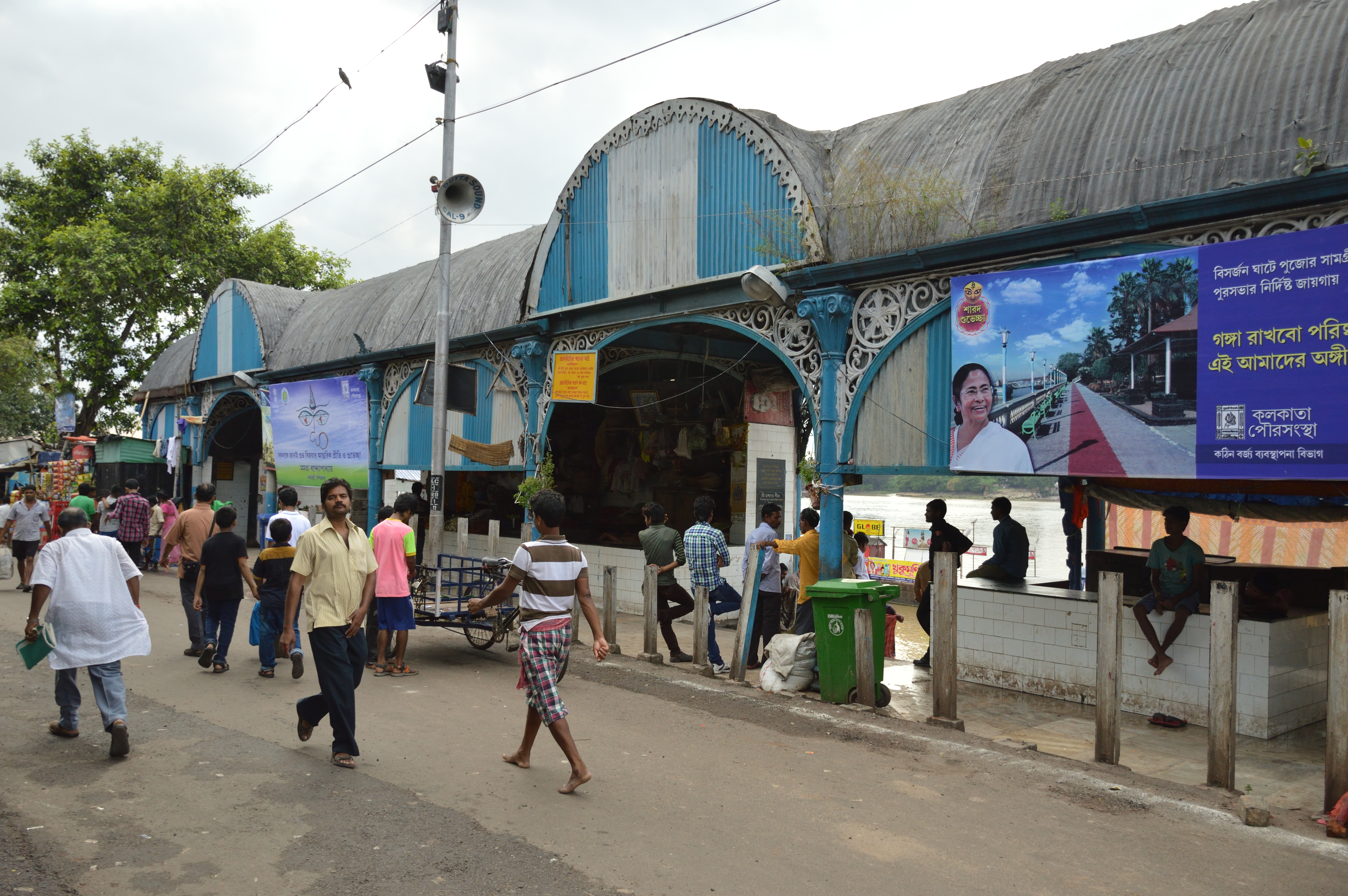
New renovated building of Ahiritala Ghat

Rajchandra focused on doing philanthropic and public welfare work. After Babughat, he built a huge bathing ghat in Aheritola. He built a huge pucca house on his own land for patients with internal bleeding who were on their way to death at Nimtala crematorium. Accommodation, food and medical facilities were arranged for the inmates. Doctors and attendants were appointed to take care of the patients round the clock. All these news of Rajchandra's charitable deeds spread quickly. Rajchandra's fame was published in the newspapers. Rajchandra's public welfare work was recorded in the India Gazette. In 1817, Rajchandra's father Preetoram died. His mother died that same year. With the generosity of money, he performed a grand Shraddha ceremony for his parents. Rajchandra, who was without parents, lived with his wife and daughters in a palace-like residence at 71 Free School Street.

Towards Education

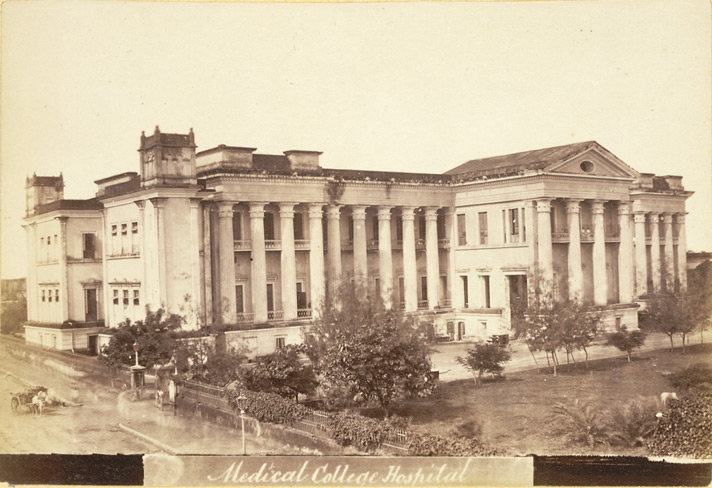
Calcutta Medical College

Rajchandra took up the task of showing his position to the intellectuals of Kolkata. To connect himself with the intellectual community, Rajchandra generously helped in the establishment of the Hindu College in Kolkata. He also donated a large amount of money to establish the Calcutta Medical College.

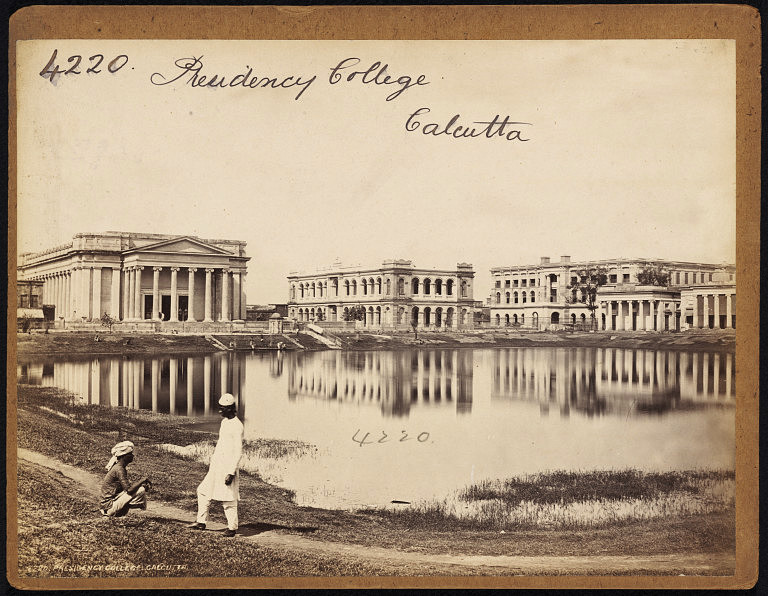
The Hindu College in Calcutta

Eden Gardens

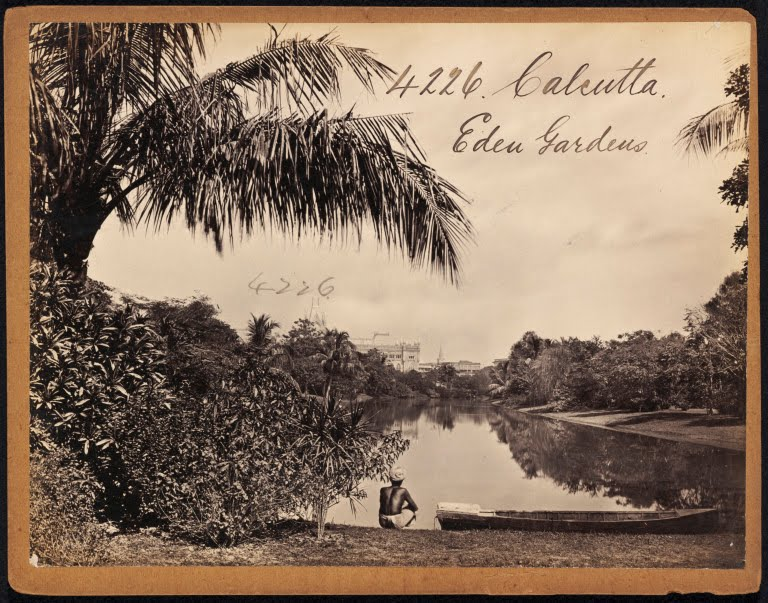
Eden Gardens

According to popular culture, Raj Chandra gifted one of his biggest gardens, Marh Bagan, besides the river Hooghly, to Lord Auckland and his sister Emily Eden in gratitude for their help in saving his third daughter from a fatal disease. The garden was then renamed to the Eden Gardens.

Gaining fame

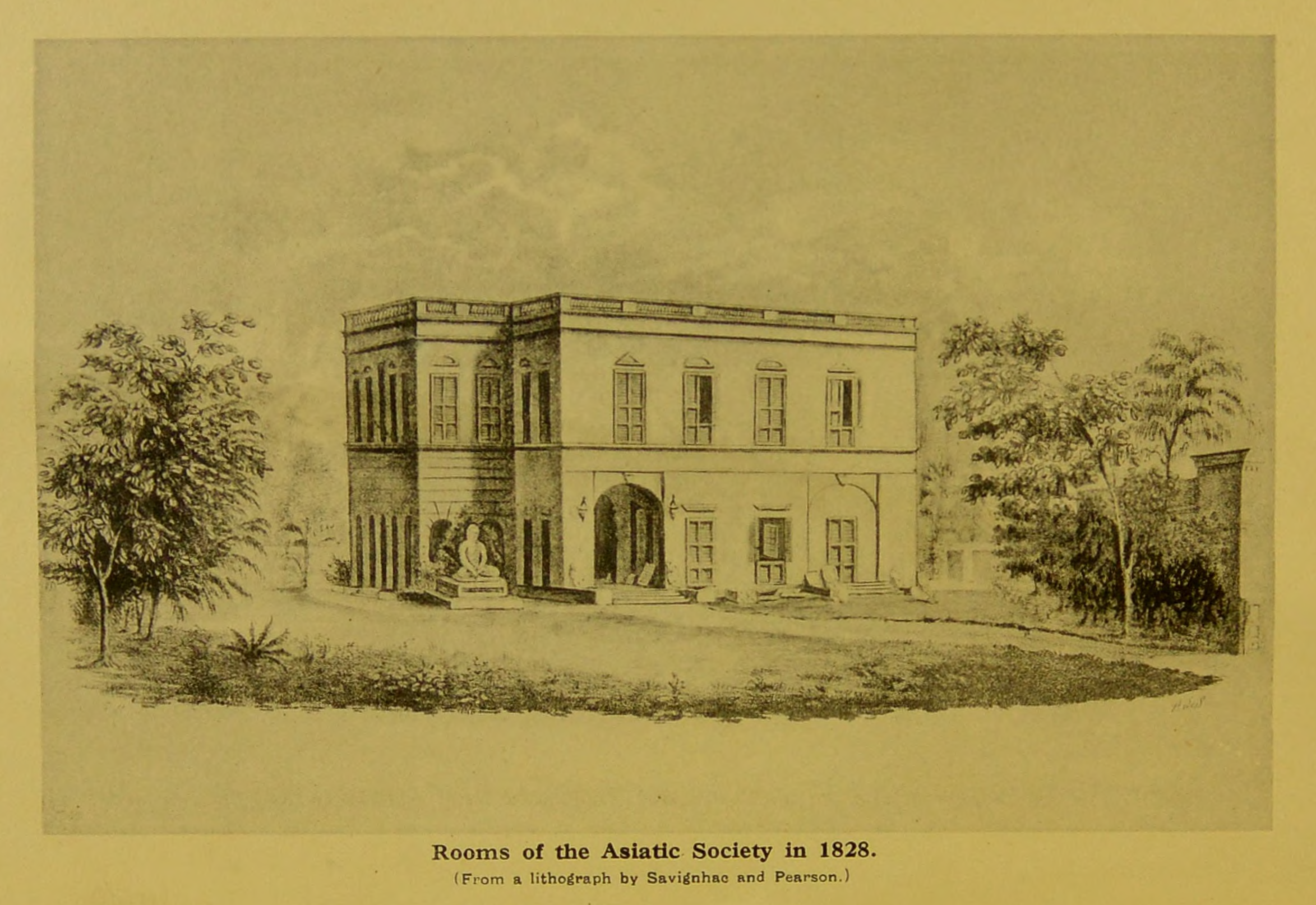
The Asiatic society

Rajchandra's fame gradually spread everywhere through all these public welfare works. By involving himself in welfare works for the common people, against luxury and debauchery, Rajchandra established his clean and distinct image from the then company-minded businessmen and landlords. This strengthened Rajchandra's position among the so-called upper caste Hindu elite. He became one of the foremost members of the Bhadralok samaj of the Bengal Presidency. Raja Rammohan Roy, Prince Dwarkanath Tagore, Raja Kalikrishna Tagore, Raja Radhakanta Deb, Dewan Gangagobindo Singha, Prasanna Kumar Tagore. Along with gaining the same status as Kaliprasanna Singha, Ramdulal Sarkar and others, Rajchandra's name was placed in or even above their ranks. Rajchandra, who was of Mahishya descent, was recognized along with the other high caste kings, maharajas, and zamindars of the 19th century. He also received official recognition. He was awarded the prestigious title of Roy Bahadur by the Lord Amherst, the Governor-General of India himself. The British East India Company officially recognised the title of 'Raja' as he was already popularly called by the people. The company also appointed him as an honorary magistrate. Rajchandra also joined in preventing the practice of sati by Rammohan Roy. In 1829, the first bank was established in Calcutta, called the Bank of Calcutta. Rajchandra became the director of that bank and in the same year, he was among the handful of Indians elected to be the members of The Asiatic Society. The greats of Bengal, such as Ishwar Chandra Vidyasagar regularly visited Rajchandra's house.

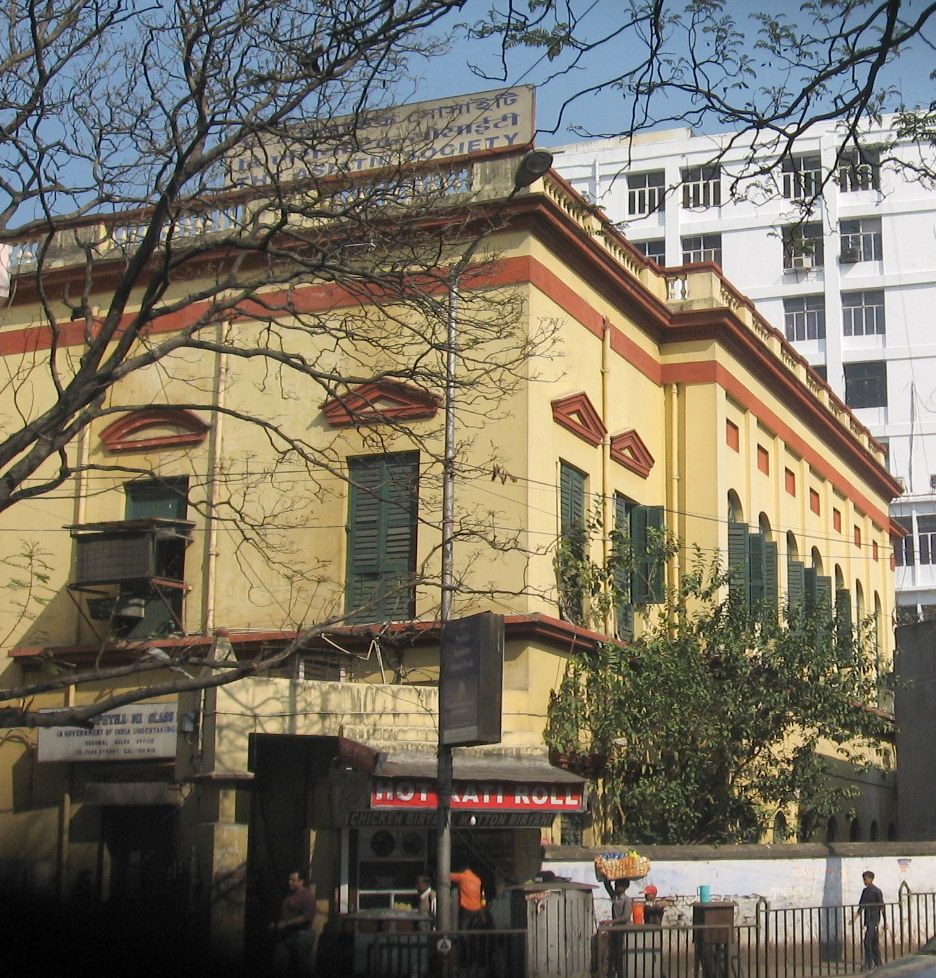
The Asiatic society

== Family ==
Rajchandra and Rashmoni had four daughters. Padmamani, Kumari, Karunamoyee, and Jagadamba. One son died after being born. The girls were all married to the same caste. Because marriage between different castes was unthinkable at that time. It was considered a religious sin. The eldest daughter was married to Ramchandra Ata, a member of another Mahishya Zamindar family. The second daughter was married to Pyarimohan Chowdhury, a resident of Sonabere village in Khulna district. The third daughter, Karunamoyee, was married to Mathuramohan Biswas. After the short-lived death of Karunamoyee, the third son-in-law, Mathuramohan, married off his fourth daughter, Jagadamba, and left his son-in-law at home.

== Death & Legacy ==
On 9 June 1836, Rajchandra suffered a heart attack while traveling in a carriage, resulting in cerebral hemorrhage and paralysis, and died at the age of 53.

After Rajchandra's death, as he had no son, the sole responsibility of business and land ownership fell on Rani Rashmoni. Rashmoni managed the affairs of the kingdom with a very firm hand, slow-paced, and intelligent hand, ensuring her strong position in her husband's absence. She gradually became proficient in land ownership by changing her husband's seal and sealing it in her own name. Her son-in-law Mathuramohan always helped her in land ownership. In addition to 'Babu Rajchandra Das' Ghat' or Babughat, she also had a ghat built for opening the market. She had a wide road built from Chowrangi for bathers and pilgrims to reach Babughat. Later, that road was named Auckland Road. Now we know that road as Rani Rashmoni Avenue. Before his death, Rajchandra left behind a large estate and cash of Rs 68 lakh. He had shares of Bank of Bengal worth Rs 8 lakh in his name. In addition, he had lent Rs 3 lakh to people.
