= Ramdulal Sarkar =

19th century businessman

- রামদুলাল সরকার
- Born: 1752; Dum Dum, Calcutta, Bengal, Company rule in India
- Died: 1 April 1825 (age 72-73); Calcutta, Bengal Presidency
- Occupations: Businessman, Merchant
- Children: Ashutosh De (Chatu Babu), Pramathanath De (Latu Babu), Kamala Devi, Bimala Devi

Ramdulal Sarkar (also spelt Ramdulal Dey or Ramdulal De Sarkar) (b.1752 – d.1825) was a Bengali merchant and a foremost name in the Indo-American maritime trade during the 18th and early 19th century.

== Life ==
Sarkar was born in 1752 to Balaram Sarkar in the village of Rekjani near Dum Dum, West Bengal (then Company rule in India) while his parents were on the run during the Mahratta invasion of 1751–1752. Sarkar became an orphan soon after, and maternal grandfather, Ramsundar Biswas, brought him to Calcutta. His maternal grandmother found work as a cook in the house of the wealthy merchant, Madan Mohan Dutta, of the Hatkhola Dutta Family, who was the Dewan of Export Warehouses. He received education along with the sons of Dutta and soon became known for his excellent penmanship and accounting. Dutta made him a Bill Sarkar for Rs. 5/month. He saved Rs. 100 and opened a timber business for his grandfather. Soon, he was promoted to the position of Ship Sarkar for Rs. 10/month. His duty included visiting Diamond Harbour every day and supervise the loading and unloading of cargo.

In 1784, Sarkar chanced upon a foundering vessel on the Hoogly river and inspected the wreck and cost of recovery out of habit. A few days later, Dutta sent him to Tulloh and Company to attend and auction for few items but all were auctioned off. The next item was the wreck he had previously inspected and he bid on it with Dutta's money. His bid was accepted for Rs. 14,000. While leaving, an Englishman approached him with the interest of buying the same ship, and Sarkar sold the ship to him for Rs. 100,000. He recounted the incident to Dutta, his master, and he said: "Ramdoolal, the money is yours … you sowed the seed and you shall reap the harvest." Dutta kept Rs. 14,000 and gave the remaining to Sarkar. The unexpected windfall became the working capital for Sarkar.

Sarkar became associated Fairly Fergusson & Company and other independent traders as their banian. Rather than British trading houses, Sarkar associated with American traders as their local agent to facilitate maritime trading from Calcutta to America. By 1790, merchant houses in Salem, New York, Philadelphia, and Boston were sending their trading vessels to buy goods from Bengal; Sarkar was their primary associate. He became a household name with American merchant houses. A shipping vessel named Ram Dolloll was dedicated to his name by his American counterparts. In the book Calcutta Banians for the American Trade: Portraits of Early Nineteenth-Century Bengali Merchants in the Collections of the Peabody Museum, Salem and Essex Institute, Bean writes:

In 1801 twenty-two American merchants in gratitude presented a life-sized oil on canvas, the first portrait of George Washington by William Winstanley . . . to their banian Ramdoolal Dey under whose guidance they had all prospered in the Bengal trade.

== Death ==
Sarkar died on 1 April 1825 due to old age. He left behind two sons, Asutosh (famous as Chatu Babu, 1782 - 1851), and Pramathanath (famous as Latu Babu), and two daughters, Bimala and Kamala. Chatu Babu and Latu Babu were famous for their luxurious lifestyle. Chatu Babu was one of the leading connoisseurs and patrons of classical music. Today, their house is famous as Ramdulal Nibas or Chatu Babu Latu Babu Rajbari.
