= Janbazar =

Neighbourhood in Kolkata, India

- Neighbourhood in Kolkata (Calcutta)
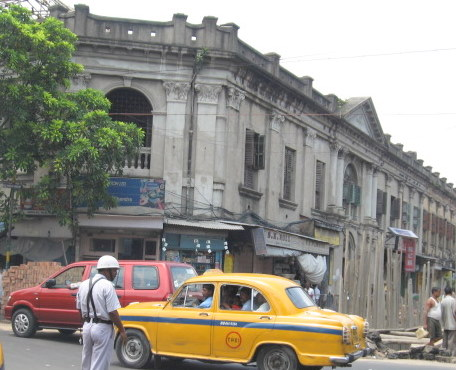
- Janbazar Rajbari

- Location in Kolkata
- Coordinates: 22°33′30″N 88°21′29″E
- Country: India
- State: West Bengal
- City: Kolkata
- District: Kolkata
- Metro Station: Esplanade and Sealdah
- Municipal Corporation: Kolkata Municipal Corporation
- KMC wards: 46, 52
- Elevation: 36 ft (11 m)
- Time zone: UTC+5:30 (IST)
- PIN: 700013
- Area code: +91 33
- Lok Sabha constituency: Kolkata Uttar
- Vidhan Sabha constituency: Chowranghee

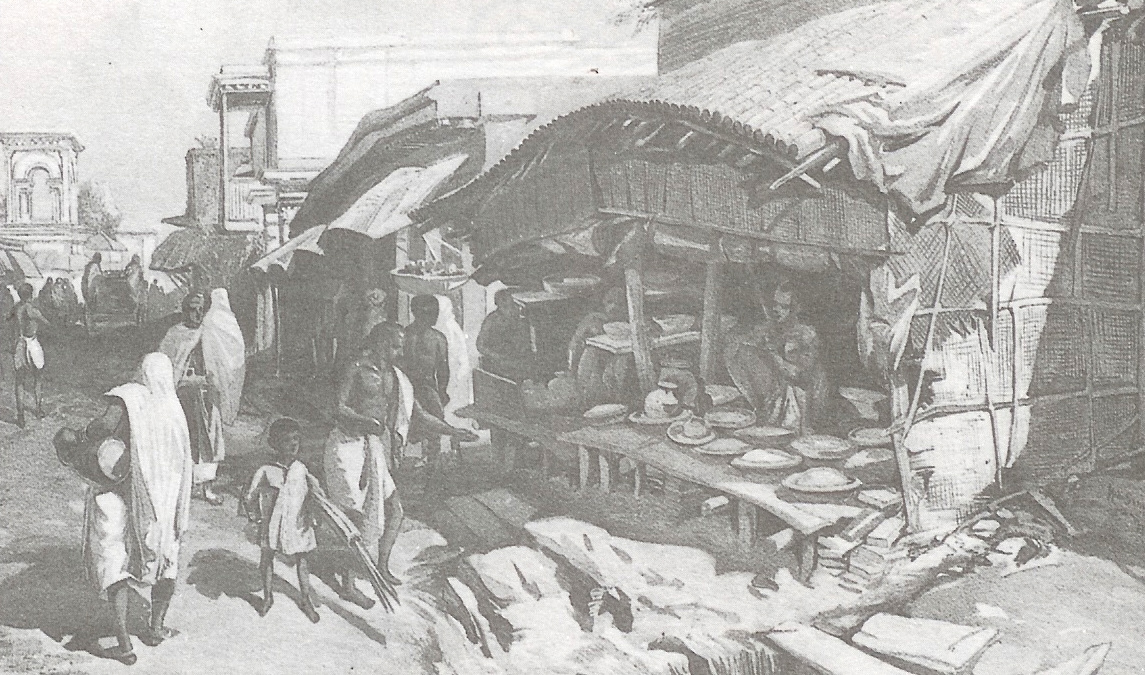
Janbazar in 1867

Janbazar is a neighbourhood of Central Kolkata, in Kolkata district in the Indian state of West Bengal. The two century-old house of Rani Rashmoni, the central attraction in Janbazar, is still used by descendants in the family.

== Geography ==
Janbazar is broadly spread across Ward Nos. 46 and 52 of Kolkata Municipal Corporation.

The road from Chowringhee to Circular Road, about a mile long, was called Jan Bazar (Jahan Bazar, meaning the World Market) Road till the end of the 19th century. It was then renamed Corporation Street and was further renamed Surendranath Banerjee Road.

In olden days, Kolkata streets had oil lamps. Then came the gas lamp and electricity. For sometime there was a tussle between gas lamps and electricity. In 1914, high-powered Keith lamps of 1,000 candle power were fixed on Corporation Street, and Chowringhee Road. Calcutta Electric Supply Corporation bore the cost to demonstrate the advantage of electricity.

Janbazar is served by New Market Police Station of Kolkata Police. The police station is located in Janbazar.

=== Police district ===
New Market police station is part of the Central division of Kolkata Police. It is located at 133/2 S.N. Banerjee Road, Kolkata-700013.

Taltala Women police station covers all police districts under the jurisdiction of the Central division i.e. Bowbazar, Burrabazar, Girish Park, Hare Street, Jorasanko, Muchipara, New Market, Taltala and Posta.

== Rani Rashmoni's house ==
The most famous resident of Janbazar was Rani Rashmoni. Married at the age of 11 to Raj Chandra Das (Marh), the Zamindar of Janbazar, she constructed Dakshineswar Kali Temple and engaged in numerous philanthropic activities.

What is now known as Rani Rashmoni's house at the crossing of Rani Rashmoni Road and Surendranath Banerjee Road, was initially 70&71 Free School Street. Rani Rashmoni's father-in-law, Pritaram Marh, started constructing this house in 1805. It took some 7–8 years to complete construction of the big house.

Rani Rashmoni had four daughters – Padmamani, Kumari, Karunamoyee and Jagadamba. Mathuramohan Biswas, the husband of Rani Rashmoni's youngest daughter Jagadamba, had always been like a son to Rashmoni which she did not have biologically. The house is now divided into three parts. Jagadamba's descendants live in 13 Rani Rashmoni Road, Kumari's descendants live in 18/3 Surendranath Banerjee Road, and Padmamani's descendants live in 20 Surendranath Banerjee Road. The family is finding it difficult to maintain the house and although Kolkata Municipal Corporation has declared it a heritage building, it has no funds needed for restoration. Parts of the house are collapsing.

== Traffic ==
Many buses ply along Lenin Sarani, Surendranath Banerjee Road (S.N. Banerjee Road), Chowringhee Road and Rafi Ahmed Kidwai Road. Kolkata trams route no. 5 (via Lenin Sarani) and 25 (via Lenin Sarani-Rafi Ahmed Kidwai Road) also serve the locality. The traffic across Janbazar, is extremely heavy. Normally, it is a scene of chaos and when a mishap takes place, it is further chaos. Sealdah Station, one of the five major railway-terminals of Kolkata Metropolitan Area, is located nearby.

== See also ==
- Janbazar Raj
- Rani Rashmoni
- Rajchandra Das
- Mathurmohan Biswas
- Palace of Janbazar

== Around Janbazar ==
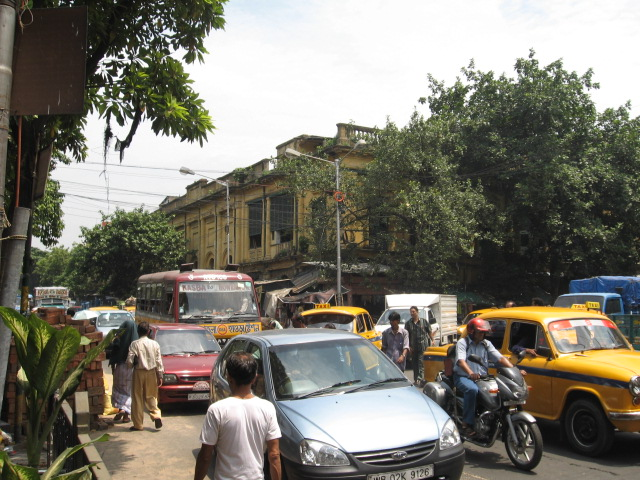
Jan Bazar 2007

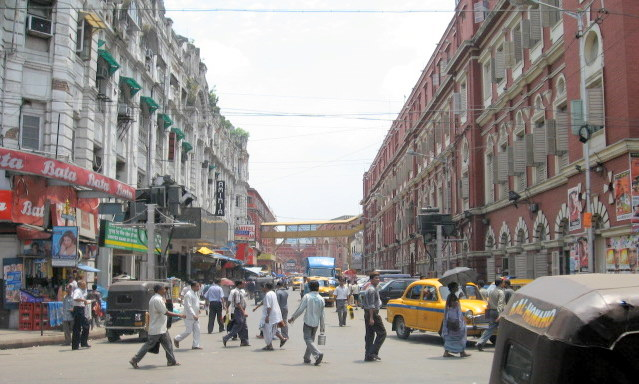
Hogg Street with Futnani Chambers on the left and Corporation building on the right, declared a heritage building by KMC

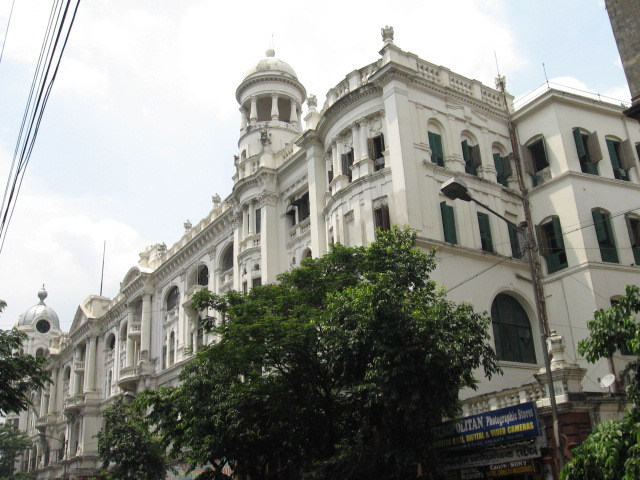
Metropolitan Building at the crossing of Jawaharlal Nehru Road and S.N..Banerjee Road.

== See also ==
- Janbazar Raj
