= Preetoram Marh =

Indian businessman, merchant and Zamindar (1753–1817)

Babu Preetoram Marh
- প্রীতরাম মাড়
- Born: 1753; Khosalpur, Bengal (present-day Howrah district, West Bengal)
- Died: 1817 (aged 63–64); Calcutta, Bengal Presidency
- Occupations: Businessman, Zamindar, Merchant, Dewan
- Children: Harachandra Das, Rajchandra Das, Dayamayi Dasi, Karunamoyee Dasi
- Father: Krishnaram Marh
- Family: Janbazar Raj

Babu Preetoram Marh (also spelt Pritaram Marh or written as Pritaram Das or Pirit Ram Marh) (1753–1817) was a Bengali businessman, merchant, Zamindar. He was a leading name in the Indo-British trade and one of the largest landlords of the Bengal Presidency. He is also credited with the foundation of Janbazar Raj, one of the foremost Zamindar families of Bengal.

== Early life ==
Pritaram Marh was born in 1753 in an once prosperous Mahishya family to Krishnaram Marh. Although, they were once prosperous but the Maratha invasions had greatly affected their livelihoods. He was the eldest among the three brothers. Their ancestral surname was Koley, but his grandfather, Kantaram Marh, had acquired great recognition through the trade of woods and Bamboo, which gained them the title of Marh, meaning Bamboo trader. Even, nearly all of the other descendants of the family, took the surnames corresponding to their professions. Their ancestral origin was from a village under the Raja of Bardhaman, called Sonatikhali village, somewhere in Northern Howrah district, but later one of their ancestors had migrated to Khosalpur village in Eastern Howrah. In 1767, after the sudden demise of his mother, he along with his father and brothers, left Khosalpur for Janbazar, to escape the restlessness which had enveloped Bengal, post the Maratha invasions of Bengal. His aunt, elder sister of Krishnaram, Bindubala Dasi had been married to the Zamindar of Janbazar, Babu Akrur Manna. As his aunt Bindubala was childless, she began to care for the three brothers similar to a mother. His father Krishnaram then left for Barrackpore in search of work, where he subsequently died in 1770.

== Career ==
After, completing his studies he joined the prosperous salt trade with the British East India company, and made a name for himself. He then met the collector of Jessore, Mr. Williams, who appointed him as his personal secretary and Banian. On the advice of the magistrate he began to purchase large tracts of land in Jessore district through his income, eventually surpassing even the local Zamindars. While serving in Jessore, he met Raja Ramkrishna Roy of Rajshahi Raj, the son of Rani Bhabani. After, Mr. Rylie's retirement Raja Ramkrishna Roy appointed Pritaram as the Dewan of the Rajshahi Raj, he established a himself as one of the Bhadraloks of Bengal. He returned to Calcutta in 1777, and married Jogmaya Debi, the daughter of Jugal Kishore Manna, the brother of Akrur Manna. After his return, he became a Banian to Mr. Dunkin, one of the largest salt merchants of the East India Company.

By 1785, he once again resumed his ancestral business of trading bamboos, and along with that he also began trading various spices, salts and simultaneously he acquired many ships for the newly opened aveneu of maritime trade, which had arrived along with the British. He became one of the foremost names in maritime trade, alongside Ramdulal Dey. Through the acquired money from trade he opened no less than 17 auction houses in Calcutta. Those auction houses were frequented by not only important British officials and foreign delegates but also, Governor-General of India, themselves. The British overlords, gave him a very lucrative contract to supply stores to Fort William. He also, acquired a Calcutta's largest rice store, in Beleghata, and brought huge tracts of land in the neighborhoods of Tangra, Bhowanipore in Calcutta. Being one of the most highly regarded persons of the city, by the British, he was the only man of Indian origin to have been allowed to build several houses on the White town of Calcutta, which was henceforth, only reserved for the British inhabitants of Calcutta or Europeans. The Mansion that he built in 1792, Janbazar Rajbari, became the seat of the Janbazar Raj.

After the Permanent Settlement of Bengal in 1793, with the acquired wealth through his business acumen, he began to acquire huge tracts of land in various parts of Bengal, eventually surpassing nearly all of the other Zamindars and becoming one of the largest landowners of Bengal. He started the construction of the Marh Palace in Janbazar in 1785, and started the family's Durga Puja in 1790. In 1800, he acquired the Makimpur Upazila from the Zamindars of Natore by 19,000 rupees, a huge amount at that time and added it to his own Zamindari. He also, had extensive lands in the District of Hooghly and his ancestral Howrah district.

== Death & Legacy ==
The untimely death of his son Harachandra had affected him deeply. He began to groom his second son, Rajchandra to become his successor, similar to his father Rajchandra also displayed an acumen for business from a young age. Preetoram Marh died on 17 January 1817 in his house at Janbazar due to old age and prolonged sickness. Nearly all the eminent personalities of Calcutta of that time, such as the likes of Radhakanta Deb, Gopi Mohan Tagore, Mutty Lall Seal, Ramdulal Dey came to pay their tributes. He left behind a huge estate, one of the largest in Bengal Presidency at that time. His meteoric rise from the lower levels of society to one of the foremost Bhadraloks of the city of Calcutta, to break all sorts of social and caste barriers is still revered and spoken off. He left behind two daughters who were married in his lifetime and entrusted his estate and business to his son Rajchandra and his newly married wife Rashmoni. His estate, maintained by his descendants, the members of the Janbazar Raj, became one of the leading families of the Bengal Renaissance.

== Family tree ==
Bijoyram Koley
  - Dulal Sardar
  - Sadashiv Toulakar
  - Kantaram Marh
    - Bindubala Debi, m. Akrur Manna
    - Krishnaram Marh
      - Preetoram Marh, m. Jogmaya Debi
        - Harachandra Das
        - Rajchandra Das, m. Rani Rashmoni
        - Dayamoyi Debi
        - Karunamoyee Debi
      - Ramtanu Marh
      - Kali Charan Das
  - Kandarpa Narayan Das
  - Konthiram Khaskel
