= Mutty Lall Seal =

Indian merchant and philanthropist (1792–1854)

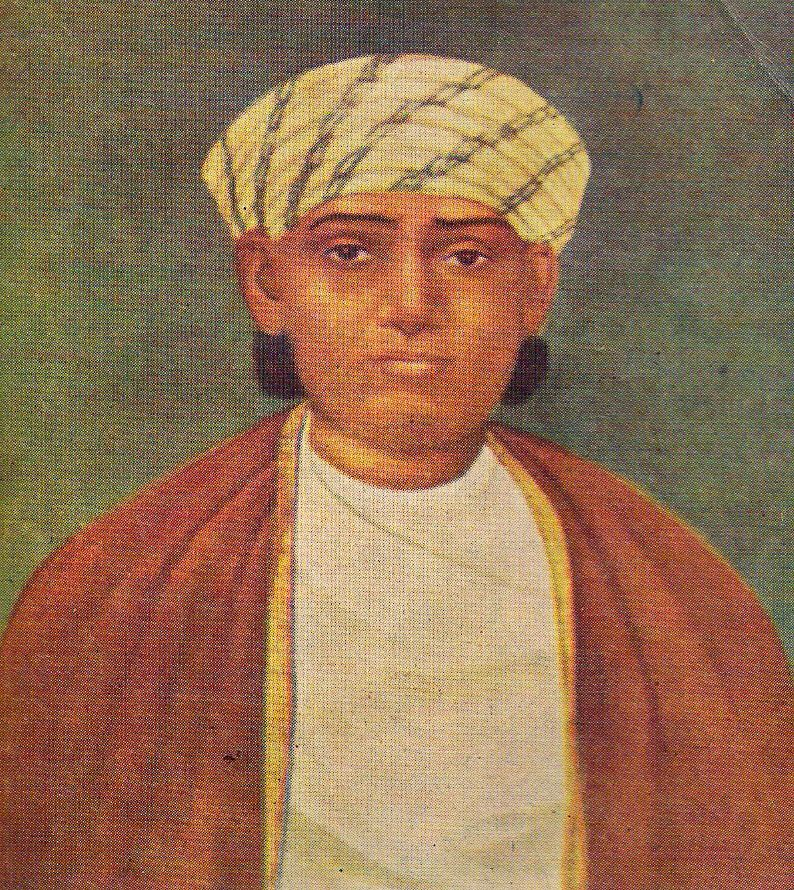
- Portrait of Mutty Lall Seal
- Born: 1792; Calcutta, Bengal, Company rule in India
- Died: 20 May 1854 (aged 61–62); Calcutta, Bengal Presidency
- Occupation: Businessman

Mutty Lall Seal (also written as Mutty Loll Seal, Mati Lall Seal, or Motilal Seal) (1792 – 20 May 1854) was a businessman and philanthropist from India. Seal began his life as a bottle and cork dealer and became wealthy. He donated large sums of his wealth to charity and education. Seal and Ramdulal Sarkar, another shipping owner, became part of Bengali folklore as merchant princes.

== Career ==
=== Business activities ===
Sketch of Mutty Lall Seal's residential house at Colootola

Seal started his business career by selling bottles and corks to a Mr. Hudson, one of the most extensive importers of beer in those days. Hudson traded in cowhides and was the founder and promoter of the first indigo market, which was established under the name of M/s. Moore, Hickey & Co. English merchants hired Seal for his sound judgement on indigo, silk, sugar, rice, saltpeter, and other goods. He was appointed as "Banian" to around twenty first class agency houses out of around fifty or sixty such houses in Calcutta. Later he became a landed property speculator and merchant, successively in partnership with Fergusson Brothers & Co., Oswald Seal & Co. and Tulloh & Co. In these three firms he was said to have lost some thirty Lakh of rupees. He was involved in exporting indigo, silk, sugar, rice, and saltpeter to Europe, and importing iron and cotton-piece goods from England.

The first to use steamships for internal trade in Calcutta, he prospered in competition with Europeans. He owned around thirteen trade ships including a steam tug named Banian. He made a fortune in a single generation through money-dealing, which includes lending, bill counting and other banking business. There was scarcely a speculation into which he did not enter, and for which he did not supply a portion of funds. From dealings in internal exchanges to contracts for station-building, for the erection of new bazaars, to the revival of transit companies, rare was an undertaking in which he was not an important, though quiet, shareholder. He funded every promising enterprise he found and made profits in the shape of interest. At one point he was in complete control over the market dealing in company papers.

Under his influence, the European-created Oriental Life Insurance Company (later reconstructed as New Oriental Insurance Company in 1834) began to underwrite Indian lives, which was the first life insurance company on Indian soil. He was among the founders of the Bank of India, and was on the board of the Agricultural and Horticultural Society of India. In time, he amassed as much wealth as Dwarkanath Tagore and Rustomjee Cowasjee. In 1878, Kishori Chand Mitra delivered a lecture on the life of Seal calling him the "Rothschild of Calcutta".

=== Philanthropy ===
As a philanthropist, in 1841, Seal founded an alms house at Belgharia (in the suburbs of Calcutta) where 500 people were fed daily on average.

He donated of an extensive tract of land, which at the time was valued at Rs. 12,000, to the then British Government on which the Calcutta Medical College was built. The Government of Bengal recognized his liberality by naming a ward in his honor, The Mutty Lall Seal Ward, for native male patients. Seal subsequently supplemented this gift by a donation of a lac of rupees for the establishment of a female (lying in) hospital which started functioning in 1838.

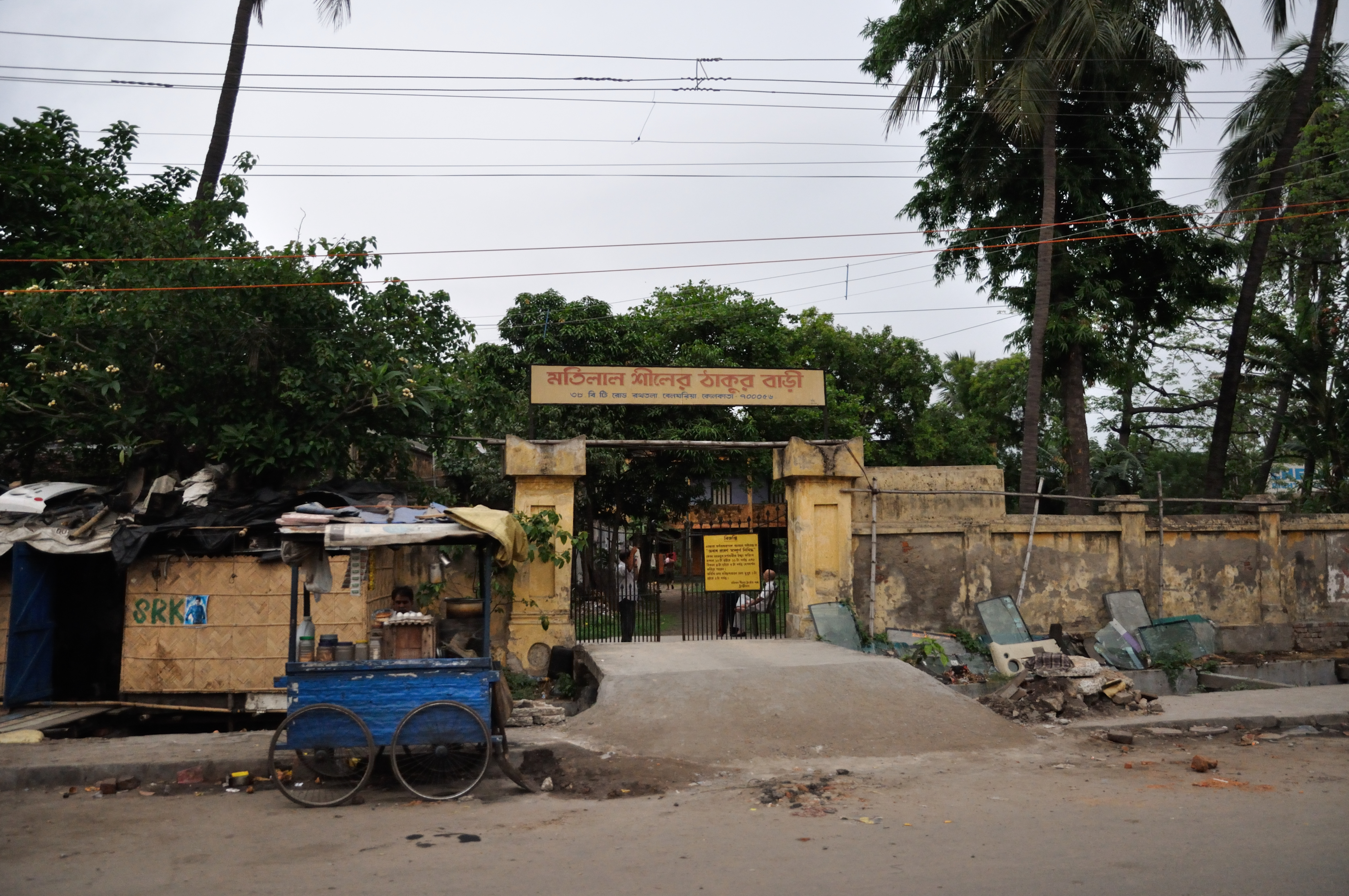
Mutty Lall Seal's shrine and almshouse on B T road

On Wednesday, 1 March 1842, a gathering of respectable people took place at his house for the formal opening of the Mutty Lall Seal's Free College. Among those present were Sir Lawrence Peel, the Chief Justice, Sir John Peter Grant, Mr. Lyall, the Advocate-General, Mr. Leith, and the other principal members of the Calcutta Bar, Captain Birch, Superintendent of the Police, George Thompson, Right Reverend Dr. Carew, Baboo Dwarkanath Tagore, Baboo Ramkamal Sen, Baboo Mathurmohan Biswas, Baboo Russomoy Dutt and Revd. Krishna Mohan Banerjee. The Catholic Bishop and all the clergy of the Catholic Cathedral, as well as all the Professors of St. Xavier's College, were likewise present. Nearly the whole of the dissenting ministers and missionaries of Calcutta and its neighbourhood also attended. George Thompson said he was "a Hindu gentleman, who had nobly resolved to consecrate a large portion of the substances he had acquired by honorable exertion, to the intellectual improvement of the youth of his own nation to transmute his money into mind".

Mutty Lall Seal's Free College (later renamed Mutty Lall Seal's Free School and College) was to provide for the education of Hindus to enable them to occupy posts of trust and emolument in their own country. This education included English literature, history, geography, elocution, writing, arithmetic, algebra, philosophical sciences, higher mathematics and the practical application of mathematics. The institution was opened free of cost, but only one rupee was charged per month to cover expenses such as books, stationery, and the surplus being expended towards furnishing the school with mathematical instruments. The number of students receiving education at one time was to be limited to 500. The institute was initially under the management of the Directors of the parent college of St. F. Xavier, Chowringhee, Calcutta, who furnished teachers to further the cause of secular education.

Although Jesuits had the responsibility of imparting education, the conductors had pledged themselves to withhold all Christian instruction from the pupils. However, later Seal dissolved the connection between his college and the Jesuits over a dispute that in violation of their pledge, so viands were distributed among the Hindu boys contrary to their religious sentiments. The institute was then placed under Revd. Krishna Mohan Banerjee. A sum of Rs. 12,000 was spent yearly for the upkeep of the college from his trust. The college stood in high estimation of the public and competed successfully with the Government and Missionary Colleges in the university examinations (Suniti Kumar Chatterji and Swami Prabhupada were some students of the college). The college initially started functioning at Seal's house and was later shifted to the present building on Chittaranjan Avenue where it still exists.

The other charities which have made his name known to the public are contained in a deed of trust; by which he donated a considerable portion of his property (amounting to several Lakh of rupees) for the good of the public. A net yearly income of Rs. 36,000 derived from those properties were spent for various charitable purposes. Apart from running and maintaining the college, about Rs. 4,000 was spent on helping poor widows and orphans every year and for running and maintaining two alms houses for the poor and underprivileged. He extended financial support and co-operation for the establishment of the Hindu Charitable Institution and Hindu Metropolitan College. Seal's Free School, Hindu Metropolitan College and some of the other institutions of the time were calculated to offset the 'ill effects' of the liberal education offered at the Hindu College.

Devalaya at Mutty Lall Seal's Belghoria alms house

Mutty Lall Seal's guest house at Behala

Mutty Lall Seal's bathing ghat on the bank of river Hooghly

Mutty Lall Seal's Free School & College - Estd. 1842

== Later life ==
When he was alive, the native society of Kolkata was divided into two parts. One was the reformist section led by Raja Rammohun Roy and the other was the conservative section led by Radha Kanta Deb. Most of the rich people of Kolkata were in the latter group. Deb strongly opposed both the move to ban sati and efforts for remarriage of widows, many of whom were child-widows. Although Seal was a conservative, he was in favor of Roy's efforts of banning sati, supported the cause of women's education as well as remarriage of widows. He made a public offer for a dowry of 1000 rupees to the person who should have the courage to break through the prejudices of caste and marry a widow. When Seal died on 20 May 1854, his obituary in the Hindu Intelligence described him as the "richest and most virtuous Babu of Calcutta."
