= Janbazar Raj =

Bengali dynasty of Zamindars

Janbazar Raj Marh Family of Janbazar
- Zamindari and Merchant
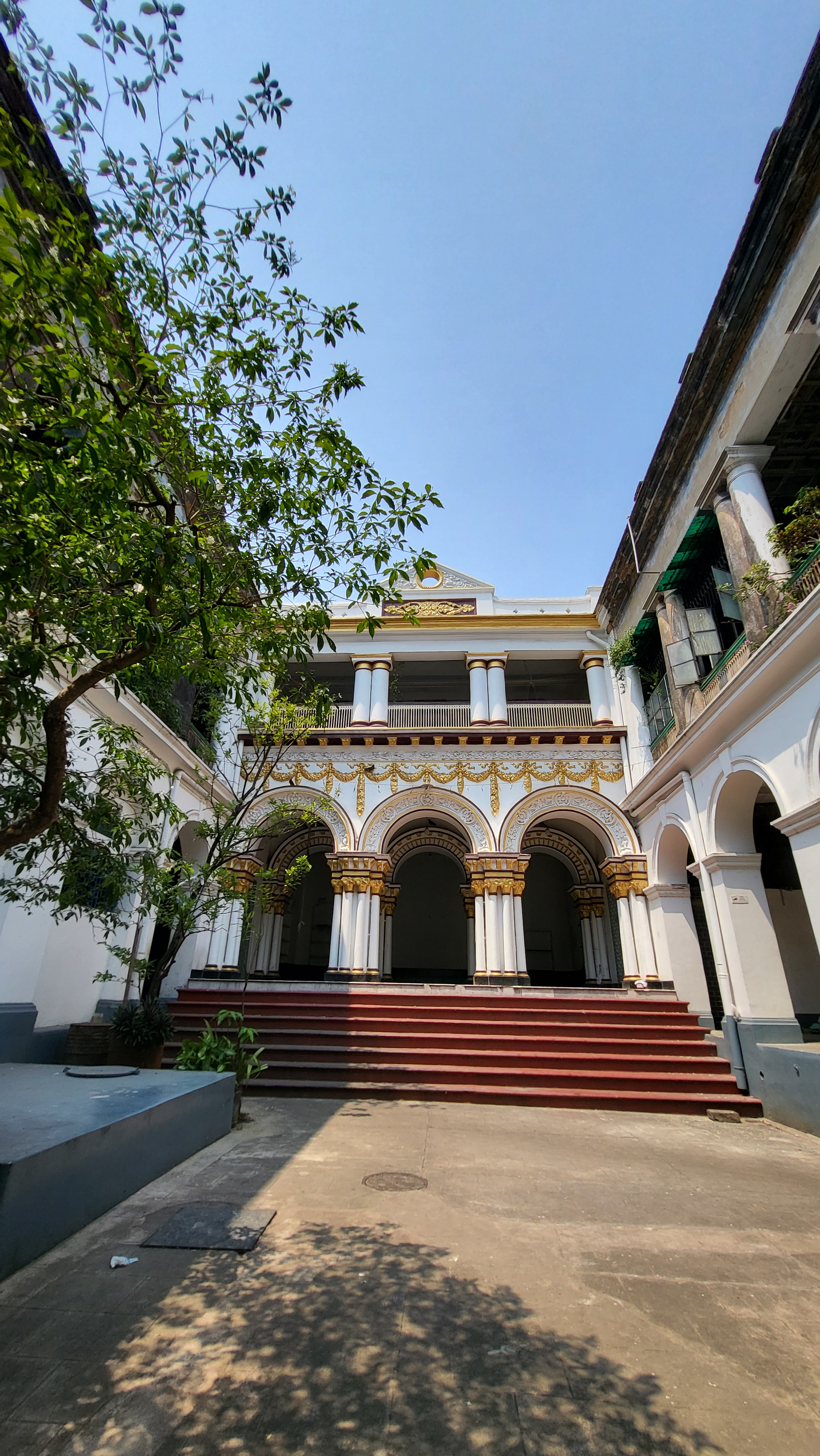
- The Marh family mansion, the ancestorial seat of the family at Janbazar
- Country: India
- Current region: Janbazar, Kolkata
- Origin: Rarh region, Bengal
- Founded: 17th-century onwards
- Founder: Babu Preetoram Marh
- Seat: Palace of Janbazar
- Titles: Raja of Janbazar
- Styles: Raja; Rani; Babu; Rai Bahadur
- Connected members: Bawali Raj
- Estates: Janbazar, Nabadwip, Gopalganj, Ranaghat, Jessore
- Cadet branches: Das family of Padmamoni Debi Chowdhury family of Kumari Debi Biswas family of Jagadamba Debi Hazra family of jagadamba Debi

The Janbazar Raj or the Marh family, (Bengali: মাড় পরিবার) has been one of the leading families of Kolkata, West Bengal, India, and is regarded as one of the key influencers during the Bengali Renaissance. Their meteoric rise from humble beginnings to royal glory stands as a mark of merchantile brilliance, class upliftment and a fight against orthodoxy. The most prominent figures of this family include Babu Preetoram Marh, one of the leading merchants of 18th-century Calcutta, his son Rajchandra Das, one of the most influential Zamindars of Bengal, their son-in-law Mathurmohan Biswas and finally Rani Rashmoni, herself.

The family contributed largely to the development in education, infrastructure and culture of Calcutta and Bengal. They were especially famous for their generosity and public spirit. They also offered considerable charity to the Imperial Library (now the National Library of India), and the Hindu College (now Presidency University).

== Family history ==
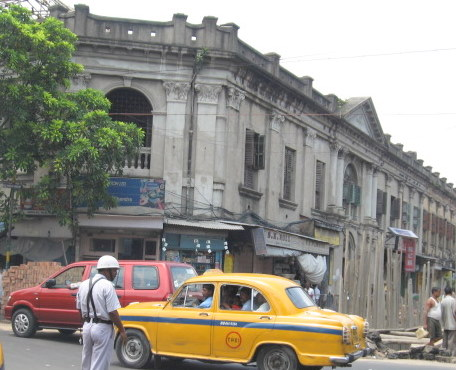
Their palace

The family rose from a very ordinary economic circumstances to the level of landlordism. The family were Mahishyas by caste. The earliest known ancestor of the family was Bijoyram Koley, Kantoram Marh's father, Krishnaram's grandfather, Preetoram's great-grand father, and Rajchandra's great-great-grandfather. He is said to be a resident of Sonatikhali village, under the Raja of Burdwan. His descendants are said to have migrated further south to Howrah. Rajchandra's great-grandfather Kantoram was a bamboo trader by profession and therefore, he received the title Marh. His son was Krishnaram and in turn, Krishnaram's son was Preetoram Marh. Preetoram worked in the customs house. He also brought many Zamindaris and started an export business, becoming one of the premier merchants and one of the foremost Zamindars of Calcutta.They originally lived in Khosalpur village in Howrah. Krishnaram's sister Bindubala Dasi was married to Akrur Manna of the landlord Manna family, Janbazar, Kolkata. They were one of the first Mahishya families to have settled in Kolkata. After his aunt's marriage and his mother's untimely demise, Preetoram along with his father Krishna Ram Marh and his two brothers, Rantanu and Kalicharan, came to live in his aunt's house to learn trade and to receive a formal education. Seeing his merit and keen acumen in business, he was inducted as the Dewan of the Natore Raj. He eventually, brought large tracts of land in that province, eventually surpassing the Zamindars themselves. In Natore, during his working days, he made a large amount of wealth and later returned to Kolkata again. Preetoram married Jogmaya Debi, the daughter of the Jugal Kishore Manna, the younger brother of Akrur Manna. In that marriage in 1777, he received a dowry of several houses in Janbazar and 16 bighas of land. They also had matrimonial relations with the Bawali Raj family in Chetla and Bawali.

== Zamindaris ==
After marriage, Preetoram began doing business with the British alongside his small and large enterprises, and within a short period, his financial prosperity started to grow rapidly. As a result of his remarkable business success, he and his descendants established small and large zamindari estates in various regions of Bengal such as Kolkata, Nadia, 24 Parganas, Dhaka, and Pabna.

- Navadwip Zamindari

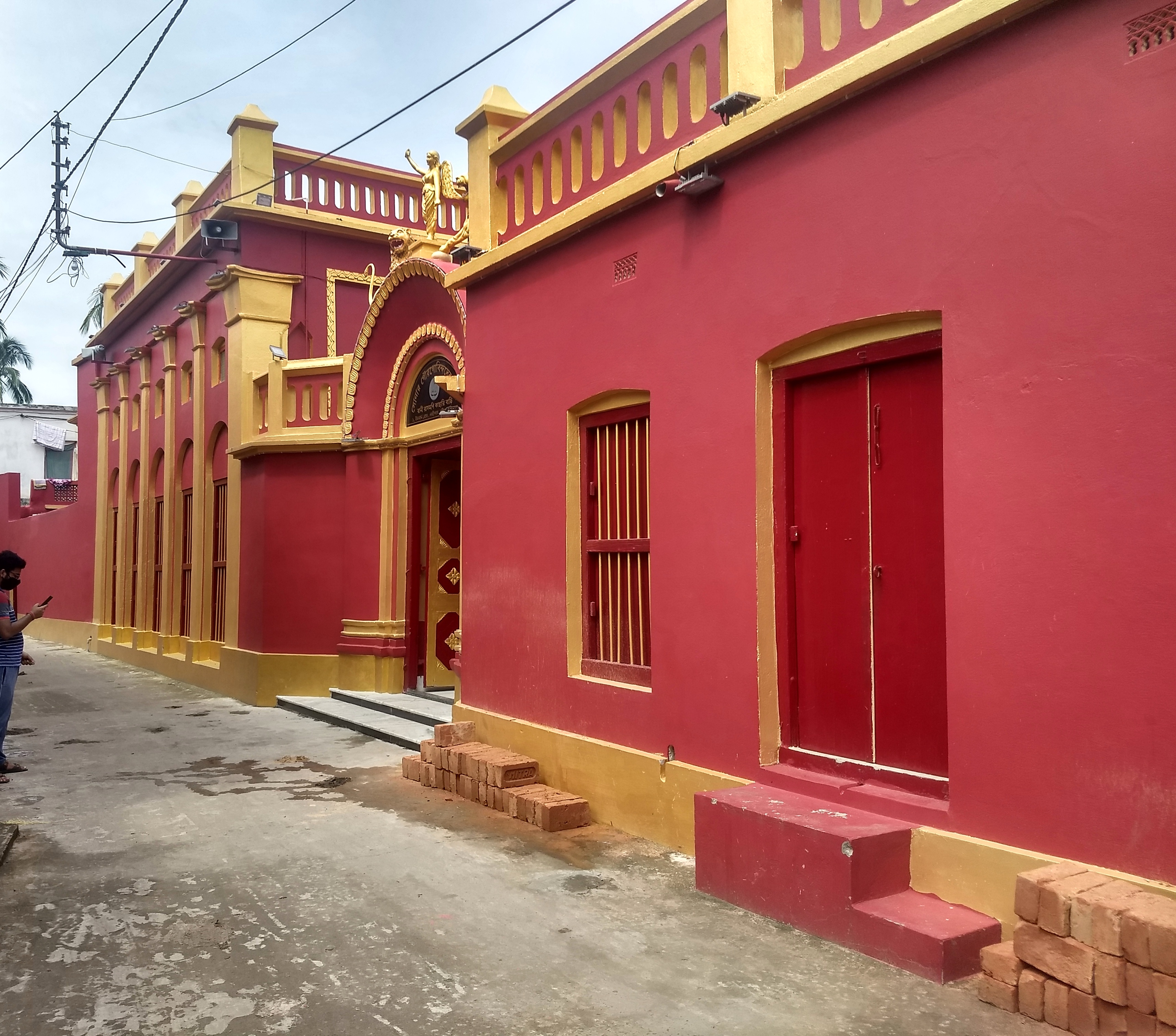
Kachari Bari

In 1841, because of issues to pay taxes to the British, Raja Girish Chandra of Nadia Raj had a vast area of Nabadwip in the Nadia district put up for auction. It was purchased by Madhusudan Sanyal, a small zamindar from Kolkata. However, as he too failed to manage the estate for long, it eventually came under the ownership of the Marh family of Janbazar. Later, the property became known as Rani Rashmoni's 'Kachari Bari'.

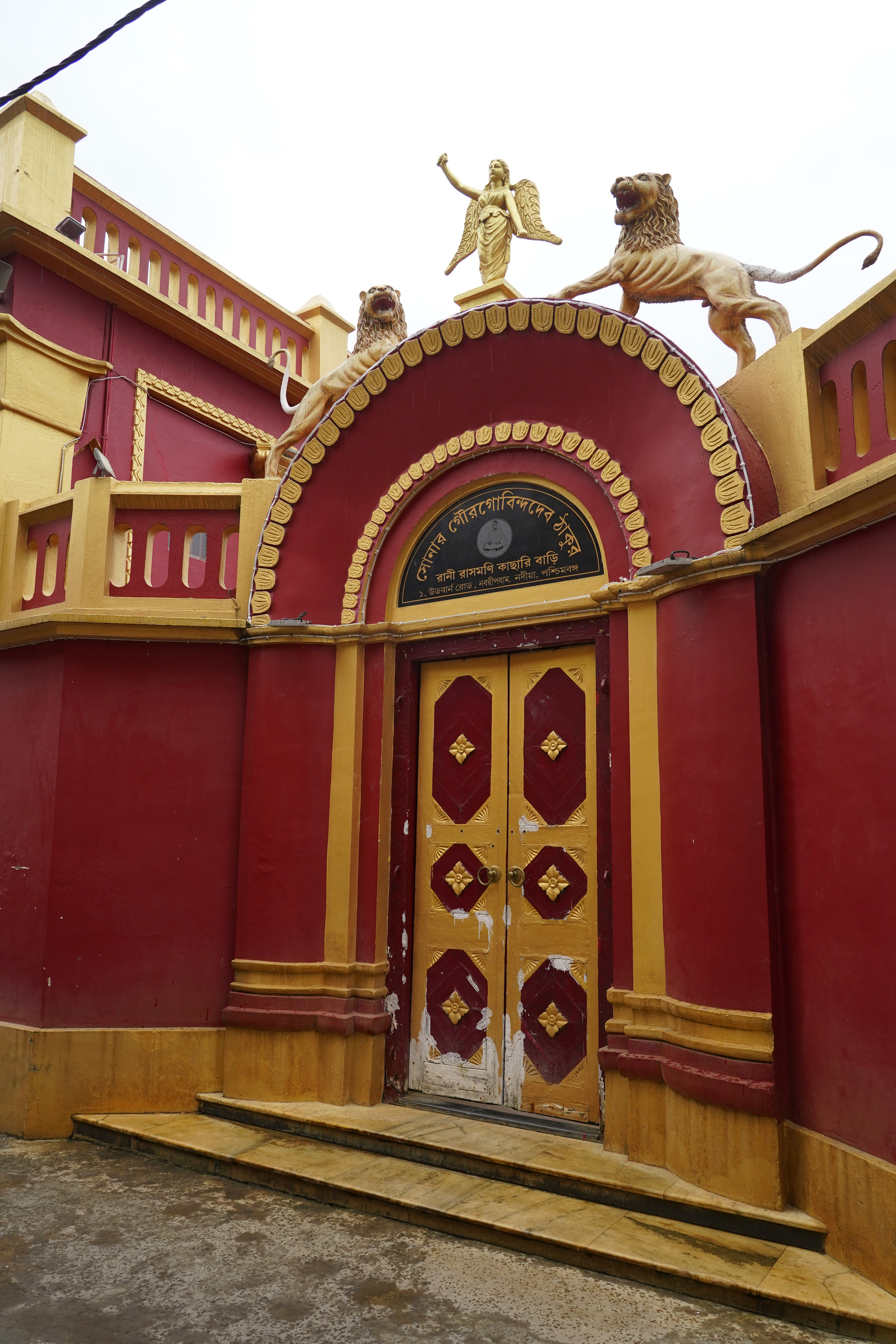
Main entrance

- Gopalganj Zamindari

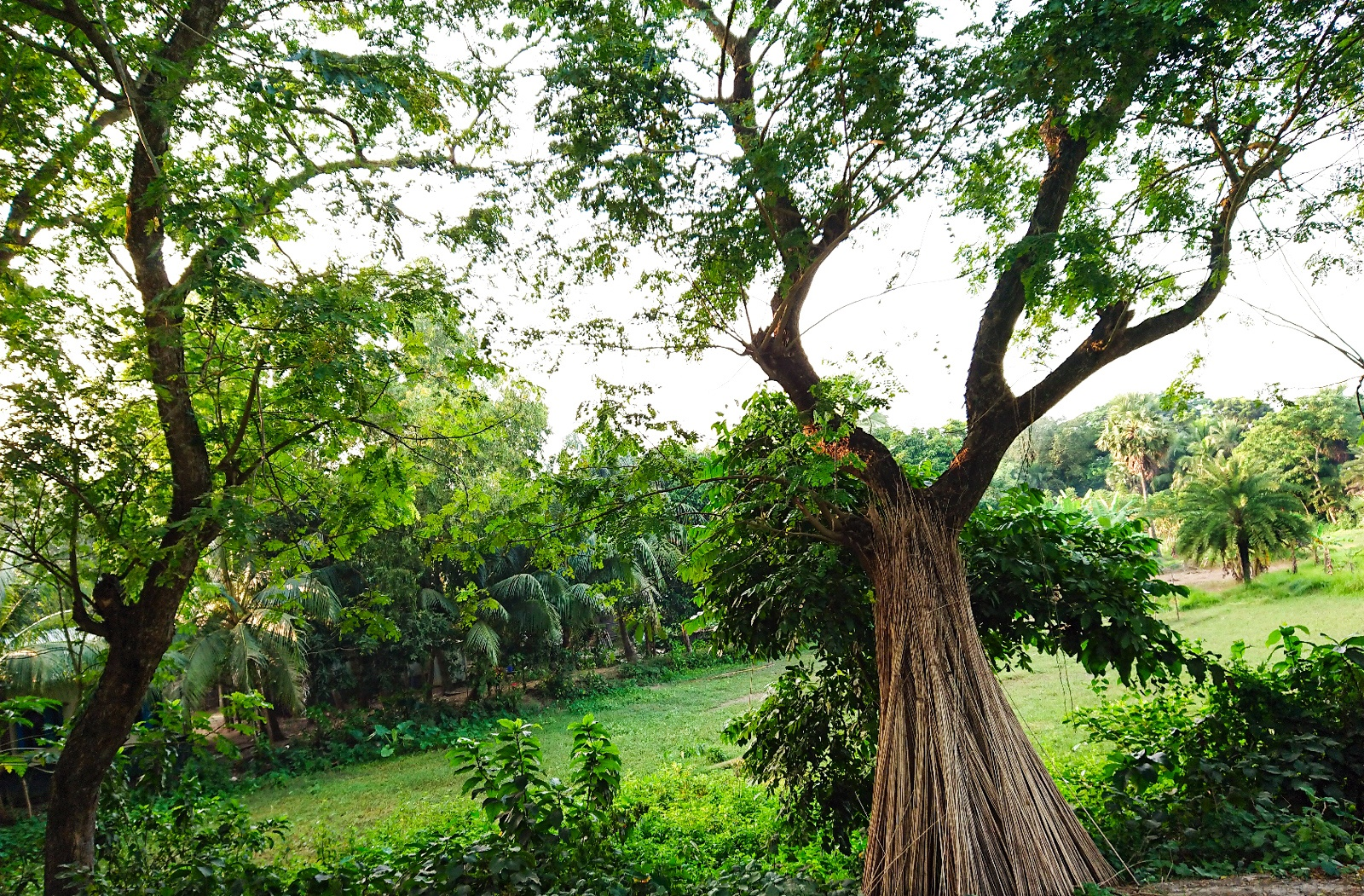
Fields of Gopalganj

In 1800, Babu Preetoram Marh purchased the Makimpur Zamindari from the Natore estate for 19,000 rupees and became the landlord of the Pargana. Mahendranath, eldest son of Padmamoni, Rani Rashmoni's eldest daughter and Ramchandra died at a premature age and Ganeshchandra (second son) became landlord of the estate. To show respect to Rani Rasmoni, the tenants of Khatra estate changed the name of Rajganj Bajar to Gopalganj (Gopal from Nabo Gopal and Ganj from Raj Ganj) following the name of Nabo Gopal, son of Ganeshchandra and great grandson of Rani Rasmoni.

- 24 Parganas Zamindari

Prince Dwarkanath Tagore had mortgaged a part of his Zamindari in now South 24 Parganas (part of present-day Santoshpur and adjoining areas) to Rashmoni for his passage to England. This part of land which was then a part of the Sunderbans was marshy and almost uninhabitable except for some families of thugs who found the area convenient to stay and venture out for plunders in far away places mounted on stilts. Rashmoni persuaded these families and helped them to build up fisheries in the surrounding water bodies that later turned into large, rich bheris. They gradually gave up their profession of plundering and transformed into a community of fishermen.

== Janbazar Palace ==
What is now known as Rani Rashmoni's house, at the crossing of Rani Rashmoni Road and Surendranath Banerjee Road, was initially 70 & 71 Free School Street. Rani Rashmoni's father-in-law, Preetaram Marh, started constructing this house in 1805. It took some 7–8 years to complete construction of the big house.

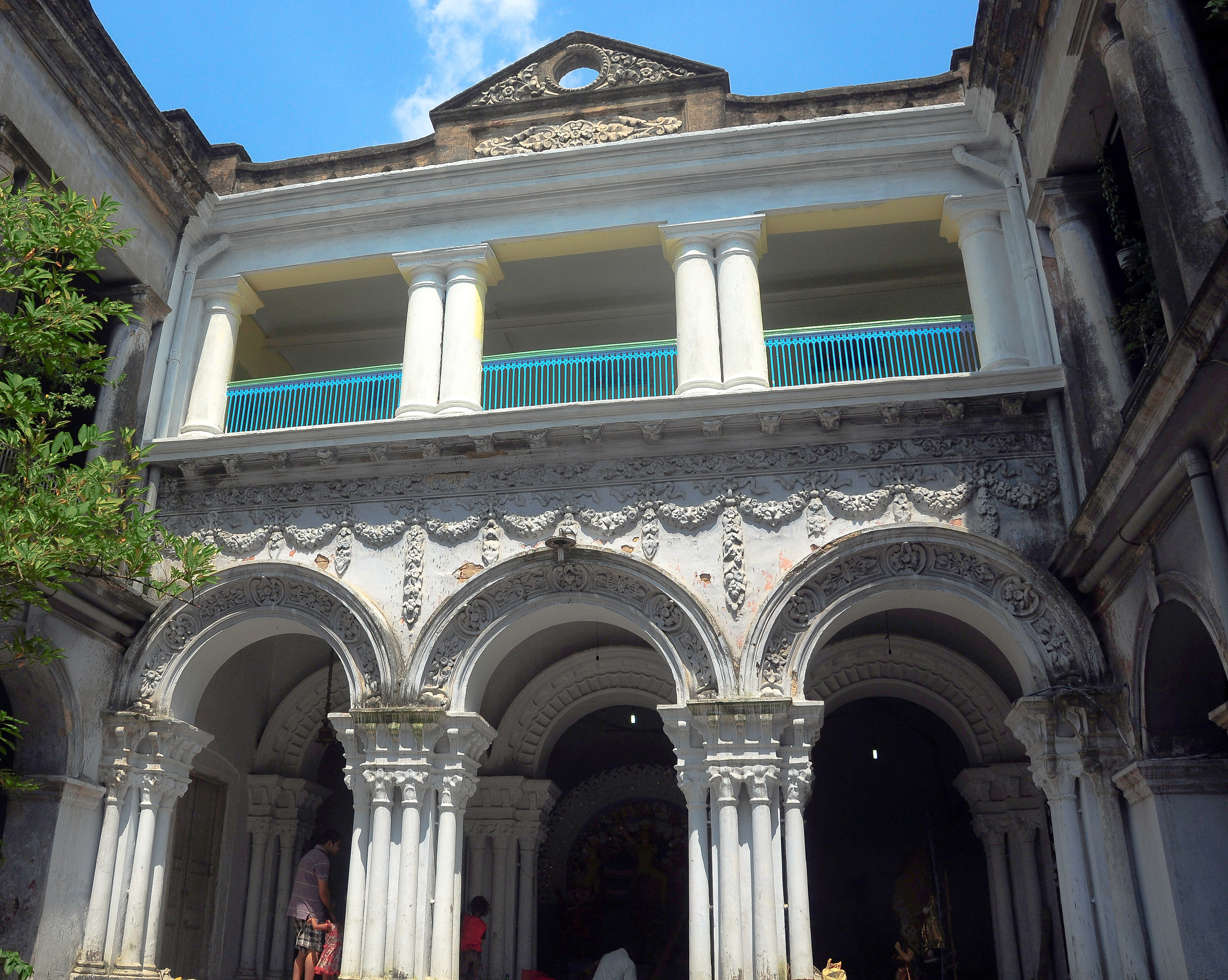
Thakur Dalan (A part of the Palace)

In 1813, Rajchandra completed the construction of the palace started by Pritiram in 1780 on six bighas of land. This palace of three hundred rooms has six courtyards, a lake, seven mahals, Thakurdalan, Natmandir, Dewankhana, Kachari Ghar, Guest house, Goyal Ghar, armory, and rooms for the guards and dewans. This palace, adjacent to the Janbazar palace, was built at a cost of twenty-five lakh Mohurs.

Rani Rashmoni had four daughters – Padmamani, Kumari, Karunamoyee and Jagadamba. Mathuramohan Biswas, the husband of Rani Rashmoni's youngest daughter Jagadamba, had always been like a son to Rashmoni which she did not have biologically. The house is now divided into three parts. Jagadamba's descendants live in 13 Rani Rashmoni Road, Kumari's descendants live in 18/3 Surendranath Banerjee Road, and Padmamani's descendants live in 20 Surendranath Banerjee Road.

== Contributions to society ==
Construction of Babughat

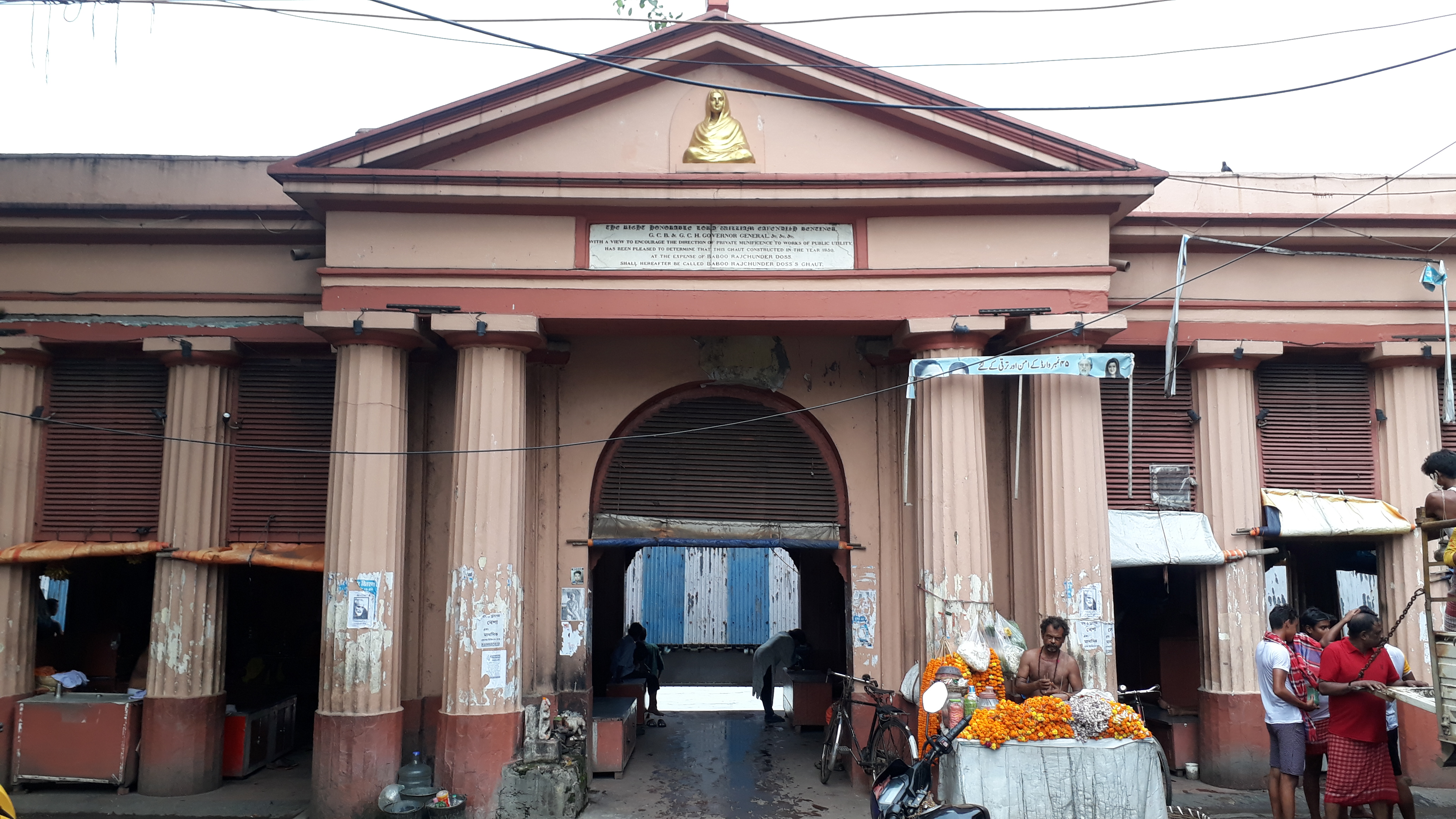
Babu Ghat

The then rich people of Calcutta used to build bathing ghats as a mark of wealth. On the other side of the Hooghly River to establish his status Raj Chandra started building a ghat on the other side of the Ganges in competition with them. After obtaining the permission of the company, he first built a ghat on the other side of the river. He built a ghat with thirty-six pillars. A covering over the pillars. Separate arrangements for men and women for bathing. Lord Bentinck's proclamation named it 'Baboo Rajchandra Das's Ghat'. It is still popularly known as 'Babu Ghat'.

Construction of Ahiritala Ghat

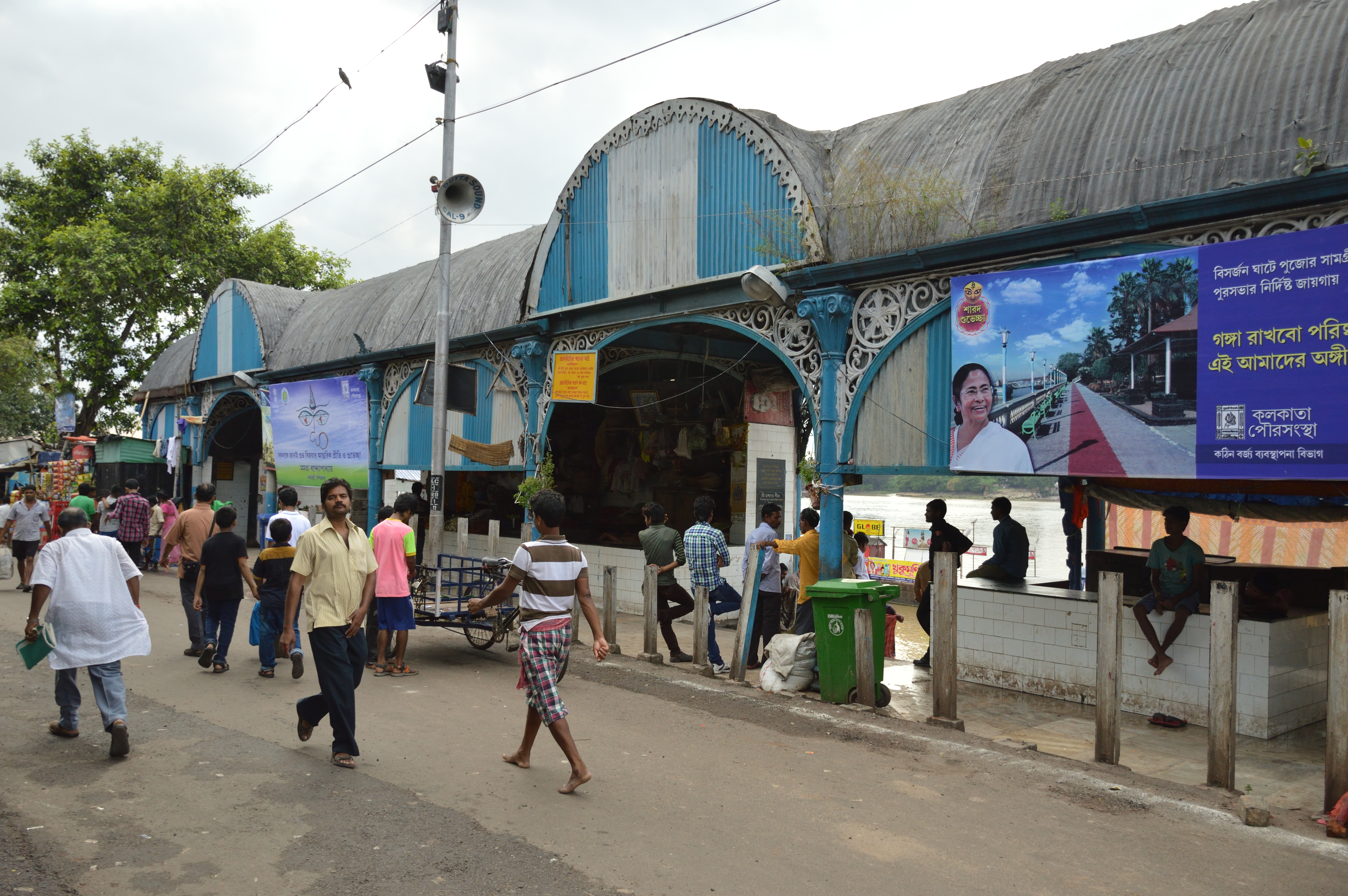
New renovated building of Ahiritala Ghat

Rajchandra focused on doing philanthropic and public welfare work. After Babughat, he built a huge bathing ghat in Aheritola. He built a huge pucca house on his own land for patients with internal bleeding who were on their way to death at Nimtala crematorium. Accommodation, food and medical facilities were arranged for the inmates. Doctors and attendants were appointed to take care of the patients round the clock. All these news of Rajchandra's charitable deeds spread quickly. Rajchandra's fame was published in the newspapers. Rajchandra's public welfare work was recorded in the India Gazette. In 1817, Rajchandra's father Preetoram died. His mother died that same year. With the generosity of money, he performed a grand Shraddha ceremony for his parents. Rajchandra, who was without parents, lived with his wife and daughters in a palace-like residence at 71 Free School Street.

Eden Gardens

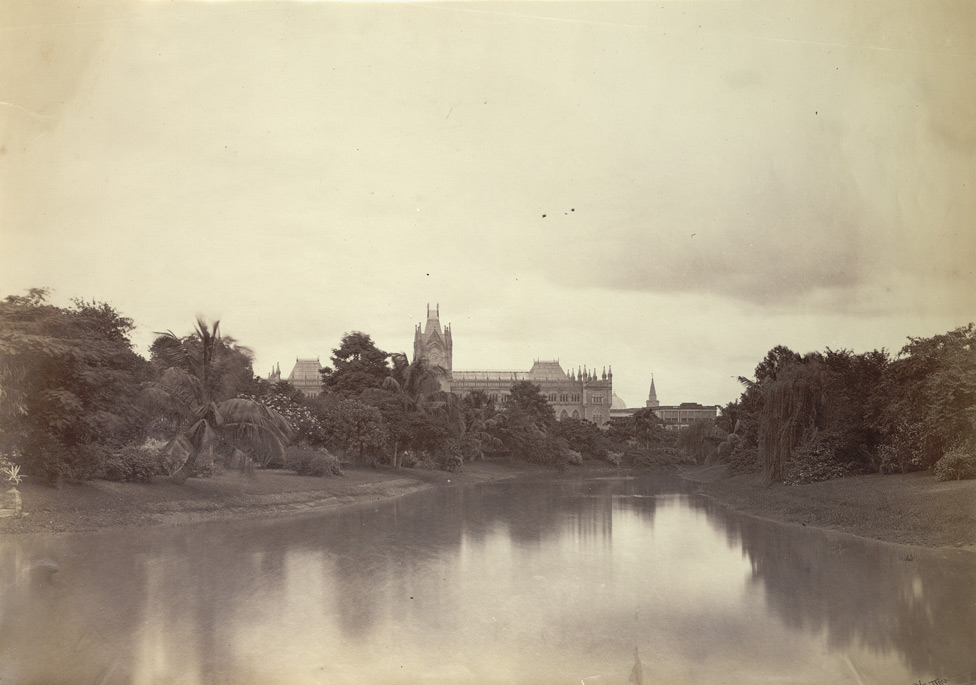
Eden Garden 1870s

The Eden Gardens (then Marh Bagan) was also a part of their Zamindari area. Rajchandra Das gifted one of his biggest gardens, Marh Bagan, besides the river Hooghly, to Lord Auckland, the then Governor-General of India, and his sister Emily Eden in gratitude for their help in saving his third daughter from a fatal disease. The garden was then renamed to the Eden Gardens.

Jadu Babur Bazar

Jadu Babur Bazar, located in South Kolkata’s Bhowanipore area, is a historic and bustling neighborhood market named after Jadunath Chowdhury, the son of Pyarimohan Chowdhury and Kumari Debi and the grandson of Rani Rashmoni. The area once contained sprawling garden house in Bhowanipore and Justice Robert Chambers lived in this enormous mansion during his tenure at the Supreme Court of Judicature at Fort William. Later, Rani Rashmoni purchased the mansion and its adjoining area and gifted the entire property to her beloved grandson, Jadunath Chaudhuri and the market thus came to be known as Jadu Babur Bazar. Around which a lively marketplace gradually developed. Today, the bazar is known for its energetic atmosphere and wide variety of goods available. Fresh vegetables and fruits, groceries, clothes, stationery, and everyday household items. During festivals, it becomes especially crowded as locals rely on it for diverse and affordable shopping. Over time, Jadu Babur Bazar has become an iconic part of Bhawanipur’s cultural identity itself.

== Contribution to Religious reforms ==
The family played an important role in the Bengal Renaissance. Raja Rajchandra Das was associated with Raja Rammohan Roy’s Brahmo Samaj movement and raised his voice against various superstitions and social evils in contemporary Hindu society. Rani Rashmoni also supported her husband’s reformist ideas, and after his death, as a widowed woman, she made her own contributions to social reforms like polygamy, child marriage, and sati, and second, to support trailblazing social reformers like Ishwar Chandra Vidyasagar, even submitting a draft bill against polygamy to the East India Company.

Temple Establishment

- Dakshineswar Kali Mondir

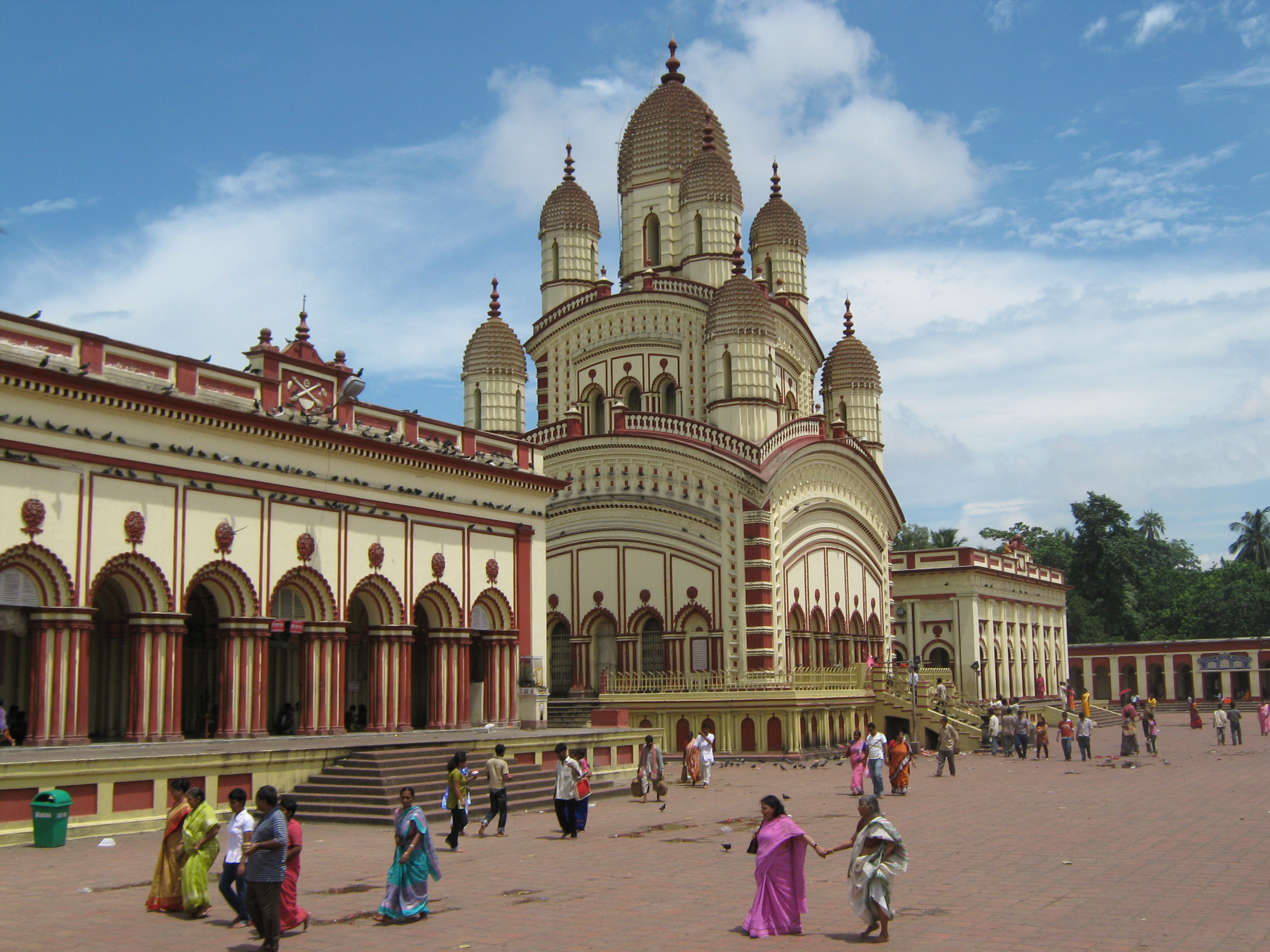
Dakshineshwar Kali Temple

Alongside these efforts, Rani Rashmoni went against the prevailing orthodox Brahminical system of her time and, as one of the first Hindu widowed women of contemporary Calcutta, established the Dakshineswar Kali Temple or Bhabatarini Mandir. In later years, this temple became recognized as a significant center of the Bengal Renaissance.

- Barrackpore Annapurna Temple

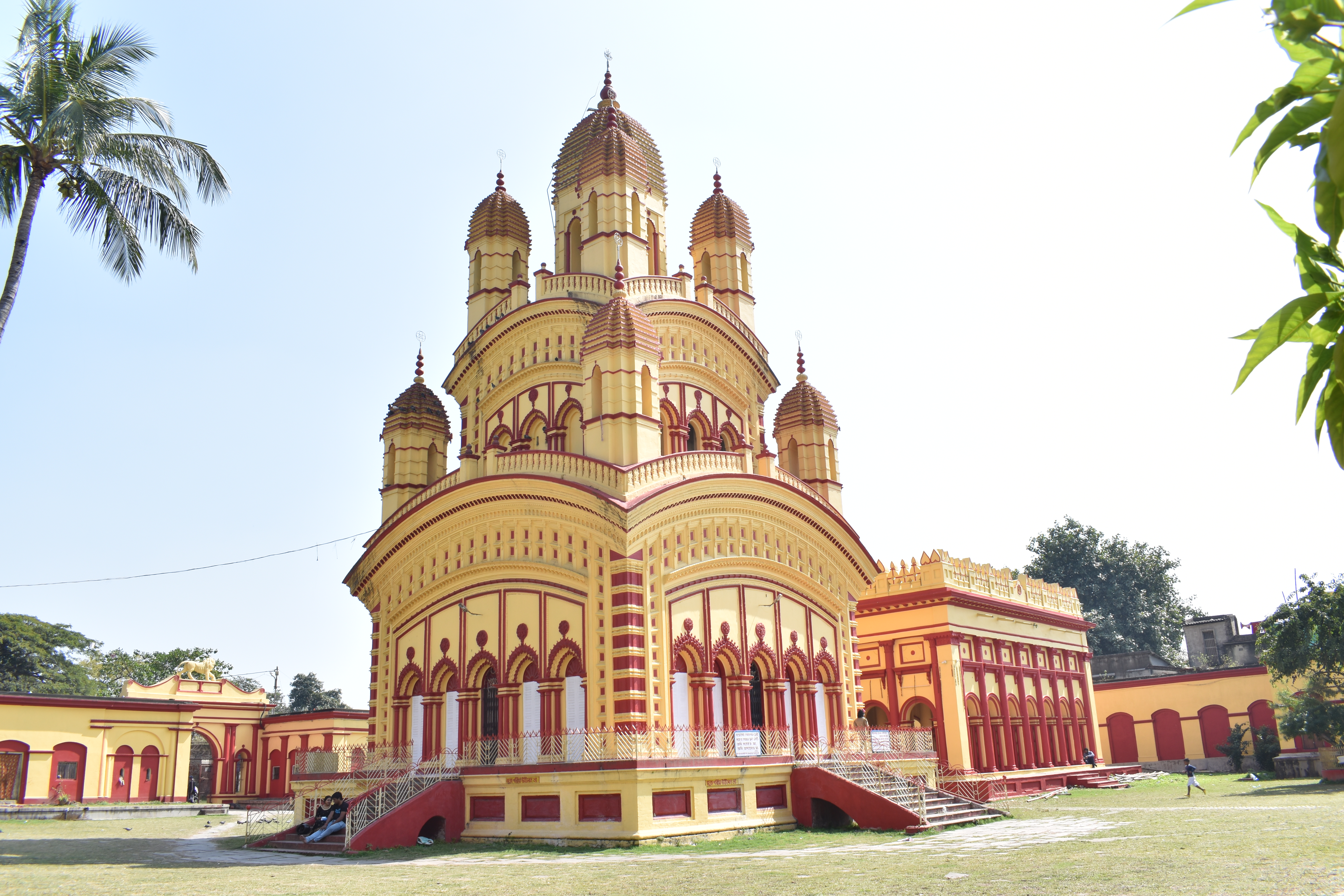
Annapurna Temple, Titagarh

After Rani Rashmoni’s death, her widowed daughter Jagadamba Devi and her husband Mathurmohan Biswas established the Annapurna Temple in present-day North 24 Parganas on April 12, 1875. Their son Dwarikanath Biswas made all the arrangements for the establishment of this temple. Later, the temple was opened to the general public.

- Giribala Thakurbari, Panihati

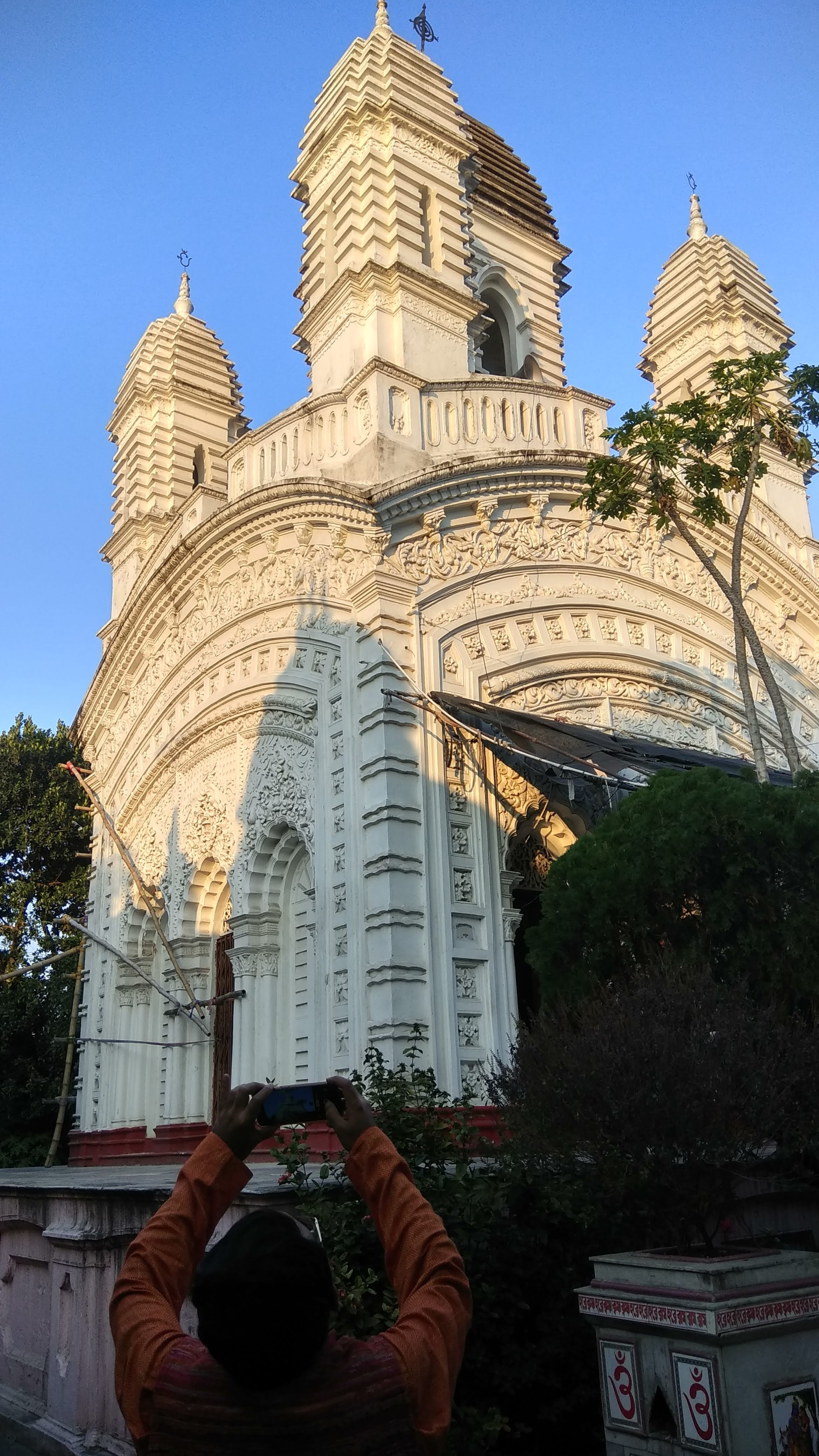
Giribala Thakurbari, Agarpara

The temple was founded in Bengal in 1911, by Giribala Devi, the granddaughter-in-law of the eldest daughter of Rani Rashmoni, and the widow of Gopal Krishna Das of Janbazar, Kolkata. The temple of Radha Gobinda jiu is located right in the middle of the temple courtyard surrounded by walls. The temple, built on a high foundation altar, has a three-arched entrance, and faces south. There is a portico in front of the sanctum sanctorum. On either side of the stairs leading up to the temple are two stone female idols, holding glass lamps. There is beautiful fan work under the curved cornice all around the temple. The responsibility to design and construct the temple was given to the firm of Gagan Chandra Biswas.

== Conflicts with the British ==
Beleghata Property dispute

Babu Rajchandra Das's Beleghata Property did not have a drainage system. It was necessary to cut a canal and provide drainage. There was also no bridge across the public road. Rajchandra cut a canal and built a bridge. Since the British East India company did not have occupation in Beleghata, they didn't need to take permission. However, Rajchandra imposed a condition on the government that the government would not be able to collect any toll from the public for the bridge. The government was forced to accept the condition.

Hooghly River dispute

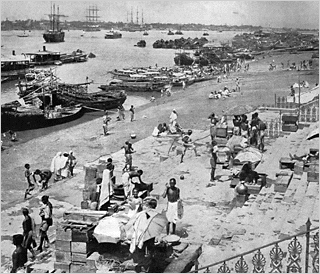
Boats and men on the banks of the Hooghly river, 1915

When the English East India Company, cintent on discovering new and unfair sources of income, decided to impose a tax on fishing boats operating along the Hooghly, it justified the move by claiming that the river, forming the city’s western boundary, was congested with countless small watercraft that impeded the navigation of large trading ships and ferries. The poor fishermen were strictly warned not to enter the river until they paid the requisite tax, and their nets were confiscated as a form of coercion.

For the fishing communities living along the banks, the Hooghly was their only means of survival. The newly introduced tax threatened to destroy their livelihood. Desperate for help, the fishermen turned to several influential zamindars in the city of Calcutta. None stepped forward, unwilling to risk conflict with the powerful colonial authorities. As a final attempt, they approached Rani Rashmoni, the widow of Zamindar Rajchandra Das, at her Janbazar residence in central Kolkata. She listened to their plight with sympathy, assuring them that the issue would be resolved, and soon began working out her plan of resistance.

Rani Rashmoni proceeded to take on a lease, from the government itself, the entire stretch of the Hooghly river between Ghusuri and Metiabruz, the very area where the fishermen traditionally used to cast their nets. The lease cost her 10,000 rupees, an immense sum at that time. Once the lease deed and payment receipt were secured, she instructed her trusted son-in-law, Babu Mathuramohan Biswas, who managed her affairs, to carry out her next move.

By the following morning, river traffic had come to a complete standstill. Across the Hooghly, two massive iron chains had been fixed, one at Ghusuri and another at Metiabruz, blocking all passage within that section of the river. Ships loaded with cargo and passengers were caught in delay, and the city’s merchants, national as well as foreign, and traders watched in dismay as their losses mounted with each passing hour.

The enraged Company officials demanded an explanation. Rani Rashmoni’s reply, delivered through Mathuramohan, was pointed and brief. She stated that the leased portion of the river legally belonged to her, giving her full authority to use it as she saw fit. Turning the government’s own reasoning back on them, she remarked that the constant activity of steamships disturbed the fish shoals and harmed the Indian fishermen’s livelihood. She had therefore acted to preserve their right to work undisturbed.

Caught in their own trap, the Company officers had no legal argument left. They returned the 10,000 rupees and formally revoked the fishing tax, guaranteeing that the fishermen would henceforth continue their trade freely and without interference.

Durga Puja defiance

During another year’s Durga Puja, Bengal's most significant festival and a grand occasion at the Rani's Janbazar mansion, a similar conflict erupted.

As part of the ritual, a procession would head at dawn to the ghat, the steps leading down to the river, to the accompaniment of drums, cymbals, and bells. The loud sounds woke up soldiers resting at a nearby army barrack. Angered by the disturbance, the colonel ordered his men to halt the parade. Mathur Babu, who was heading the procession, explained that the ceremony could not be interrupted midway. In a fit of rage, the colonel fired into the air, only to find himself confronted by a dozen of the Rani’s armed guards, who had swiftly surrounded him. Seeing they were heavily outnumbered, the soldiers had no choice but to retreat, allowing the ritual to continue.

Before long, the matter turned into a legal fight. Rani Rashmoni presented official papers proving that the road used for the procession, and where her residence stood, was her private property. The street, known as Babu Road leading to Babughat, had been named after her late husband, Babu Rajchandra Das. The deed carried the signature of the local garrison officer, confirming its legitimacy. To mitigate embarrassment for the Company’s administration, the court imposed only a fine of fifty rupees.

True to her nature, Rani Rashmoni was not one to concede easily. She paid the amount but soon after ordered her staff to install sturdy wooden posts at intervals along the road to the ghat. Ropes were strung between them, sealing off access from side streets. The result was complete traffic disruption in one of Calcutta’s busiest areas.The authorities immediately demanded that the barricades be removed. Rashmoni maintained that, since the road was hers, the government would first need to pay for its public use. She once again had the upper hand, the administration could not refute a deed verified by their own officer. Her fine was returned, and a formal appeal was sent requesting her to reopen the thoroughfare.

The incident served as a lesson for the government, which decided to avoid any further embarrassment. Soon afterward, a new regulation was enacted requiring anyone wishing to organize a street procession in Calcutta to first obtain an official permit.

== Branches ==
Choudhury family of Kumari Debi

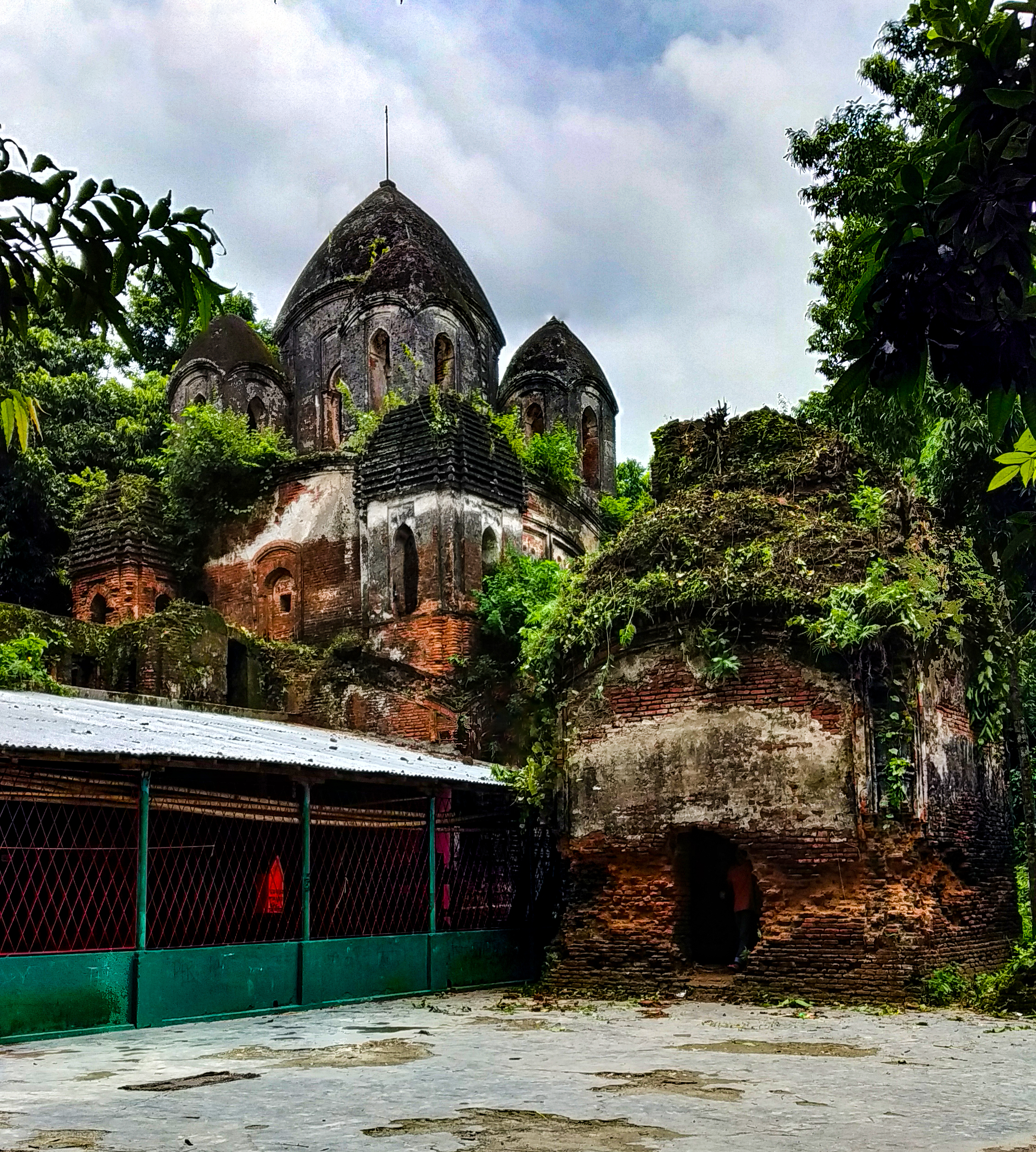
Ruins of the Shyam Sundar temple

Pyare Mohan Chowdhury was Rani Rashmoni's second eldest son-in-law, a member of the Mahishya Zamindar Choudhury family of Sonabere village in Satkhira of Khulna district. The Shyam Sundar Jiu temple in Sonabere, or Sonabere Mothbari as it's more popularly known was built by the Choudhary family. Pyarimohan Chowdhury's ancestor Durgapriyo Das Chowdhury, built the Shyam Sundar Jiu temple in 1767. After, Pyarimohan's marriage to Kumari Debi, Rani Rashmoni carried certain renovations on the temple. Babu Jadunath Chowdhury was their only son his descendants now live on 18/3 Surendranath Banerjee Road. A road, Radhanath Chowdhury road, formerly the Tangra road, in Tangra, Kolkata has been named after Radhanath Chowdhury, a descendant of Babu Jadunath Chowdhury.

== Durga Puja ==
It is said, that Babu Preetoram Marh himself, initiated the Durga Puja of the Janbazar Raj in the year 1790. A tradition which was carried on by his son, Rajchandra Das and daughter-in-law Rani Rashmoni, with great devotion. The puja was frequented by eminent personalities of their times such as, Raja Ram Mohan Roy and Pandit Ishwar Chandra Vidyasagar. The puja during the lifetime of Rani Rashmoni used to be conducted by Ramakrishna Paramahansa himself. Now the descendants of the family has split into 4 branches, and they all carry on the tradition separately.

== Family tree ==
Krishnaram Marh
  - Babu Preetoram Marh, m. Jogmaya Debi
    - Harchandra Das
    - Raja Rajchandra Das, m. Rani Rashmoni
      - Padmamoni Debi, m. Ramchandra Ata
        - Ganesh Chandra Das
          - Gopal Krishna, m. Giribala Devi
            - Abinash
            - Jivankanai
            - Narayan
        - Balaram
          - Shib Krishna
          - Shyamlal
          - Shegendramohan
          - Ajitnath
        - Sitanath
          - Amritanath Das
            - Anilendranath Das
      - Kumari Debi, m. Pyari Mohan Chowdhury
        - Jadunath Chowdhury
          - Chandicharan Chowdhury
          - Prasannakumar Chowdhury
          - Durgapriya Chowdhury
          - Nabakishore Chowdhury
            - Promilabala Debi, m. Bijoy Kishore Mandal of Bawali
          - Nanda Chowdhury
      - Karunamayee Debi, m. Mathurmohan Biswas
          - Bhupalchandra Biswas
            - Sashi Bhushan
      - Jagadamba Debi, m. Mathurmohan Biswas
          - Dwarikanath
            - Gurudas
            - Kalidas
            - Durgadas
          - Trailokyanath
            - Srigopal
            - Brajogopal
              - Labonyalata Debi, m. Bijoy Krishna Hazra
            - Nrityagopal
              - Sushil Kumar Biswas
              - Sunil Kumar Biswas
            - Mohongopal
          - Thakurdas
            - Shyamacharan Biswas
              - Jatindranath
  - Ramtanu Das
  - Kalicharan Das
    - Abhaychandra Das
      - Benimadhav Das
        - Nilratan Das
        - Nilgopal Das
        - Hiralal Das

== Gallery ==
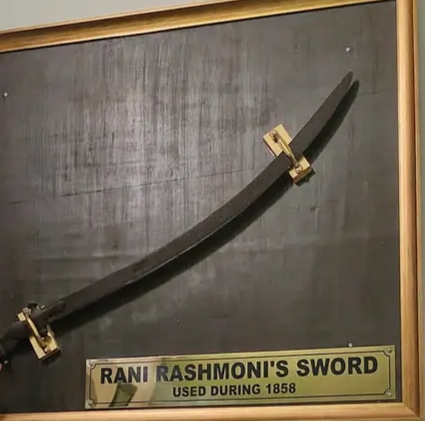
Rani Rashmoni's Sword

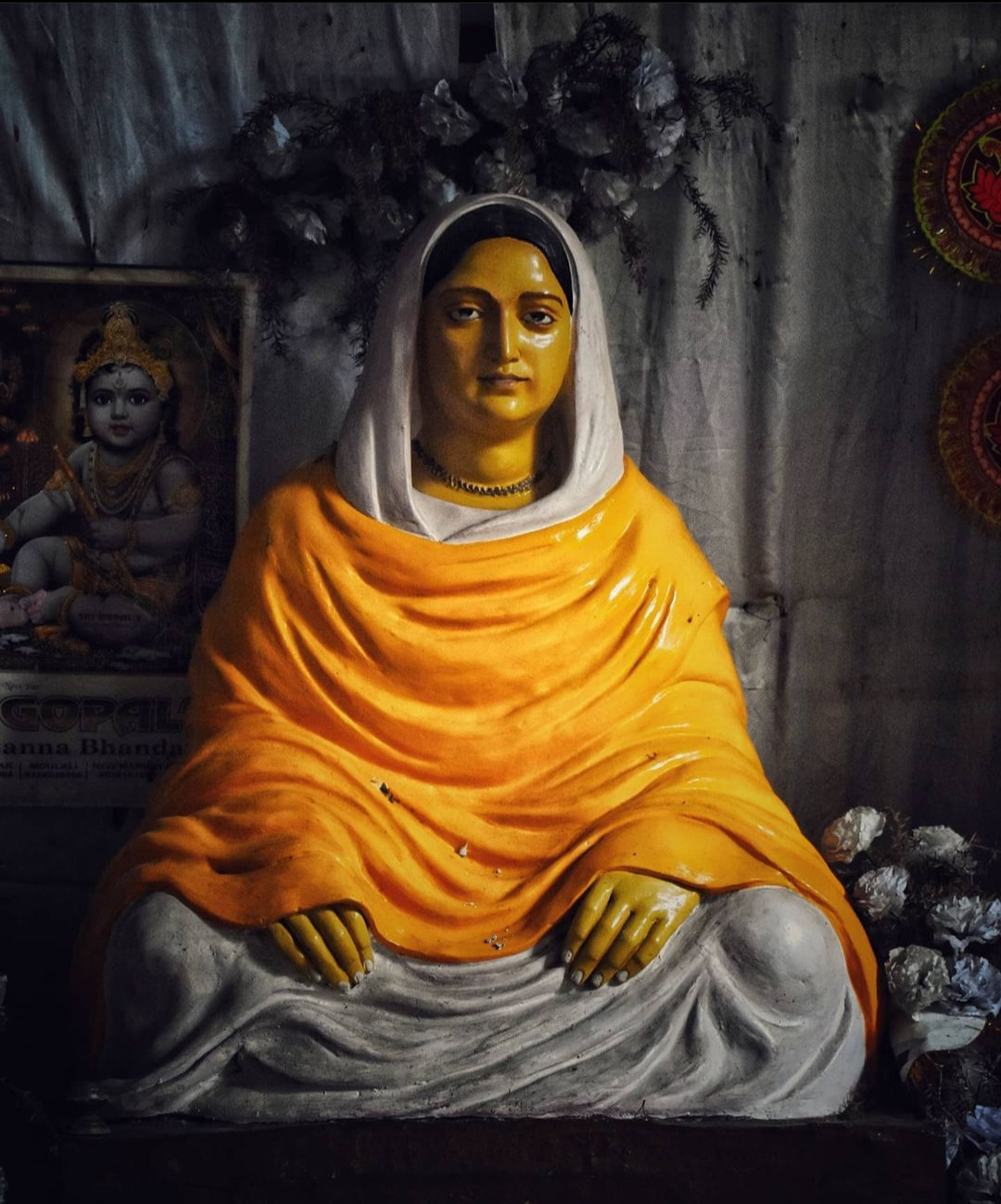
Rani Rashmoni's sculpture at her Palace

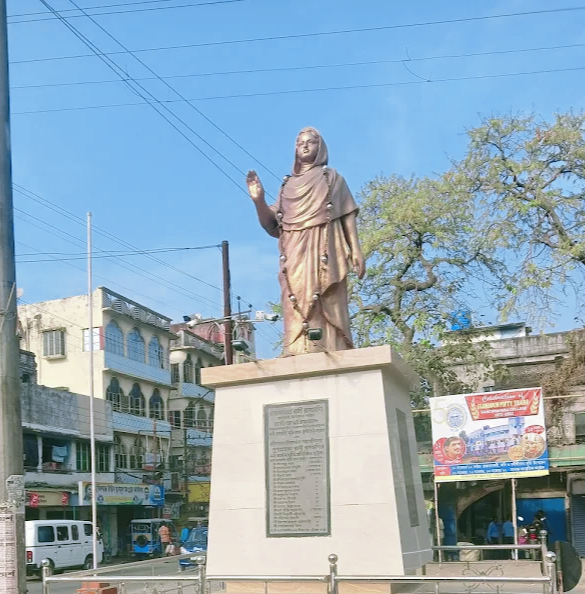
Her statue at Halisahar

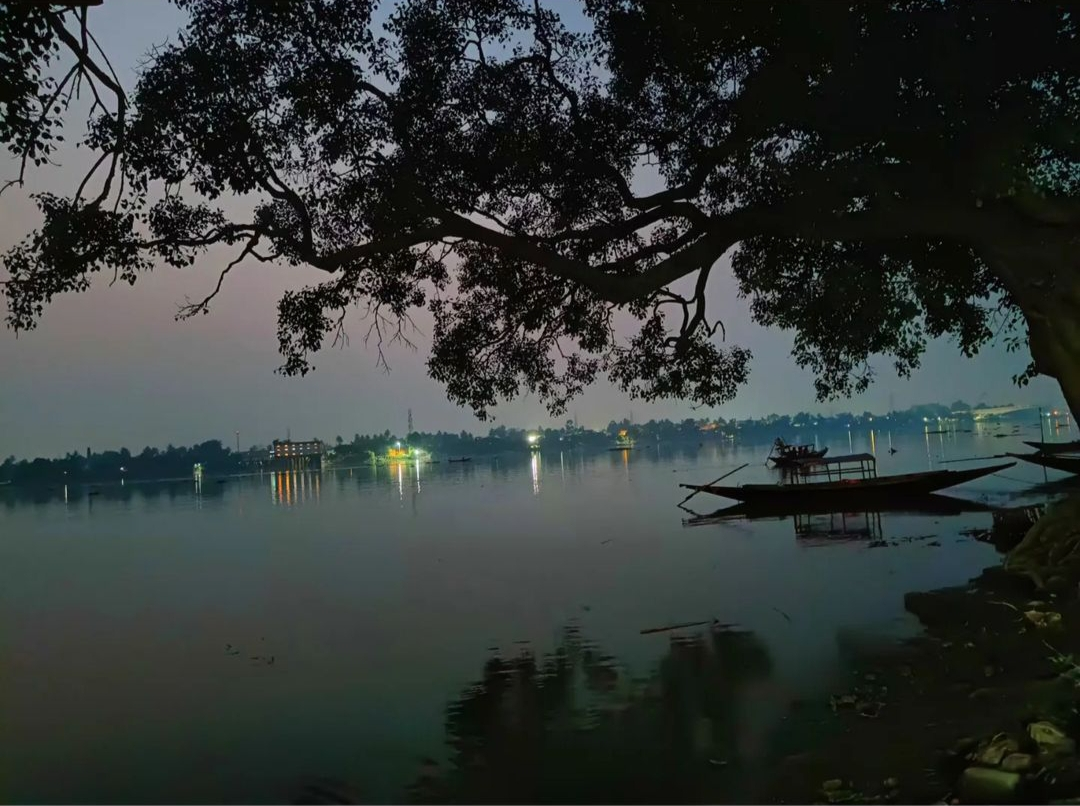
Rani Rashmoni ghat near Kalyani

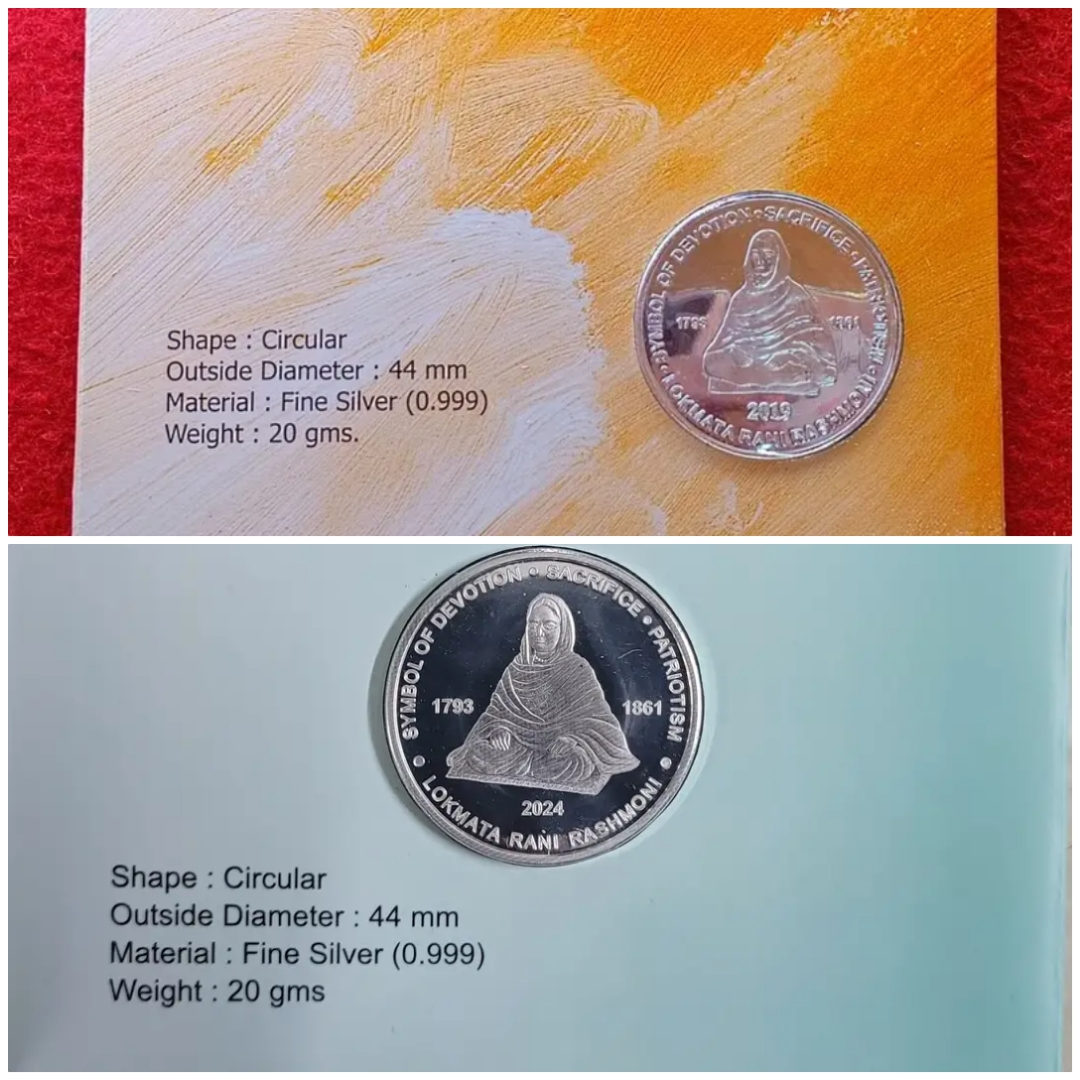
Rani Rashmoni silver coin

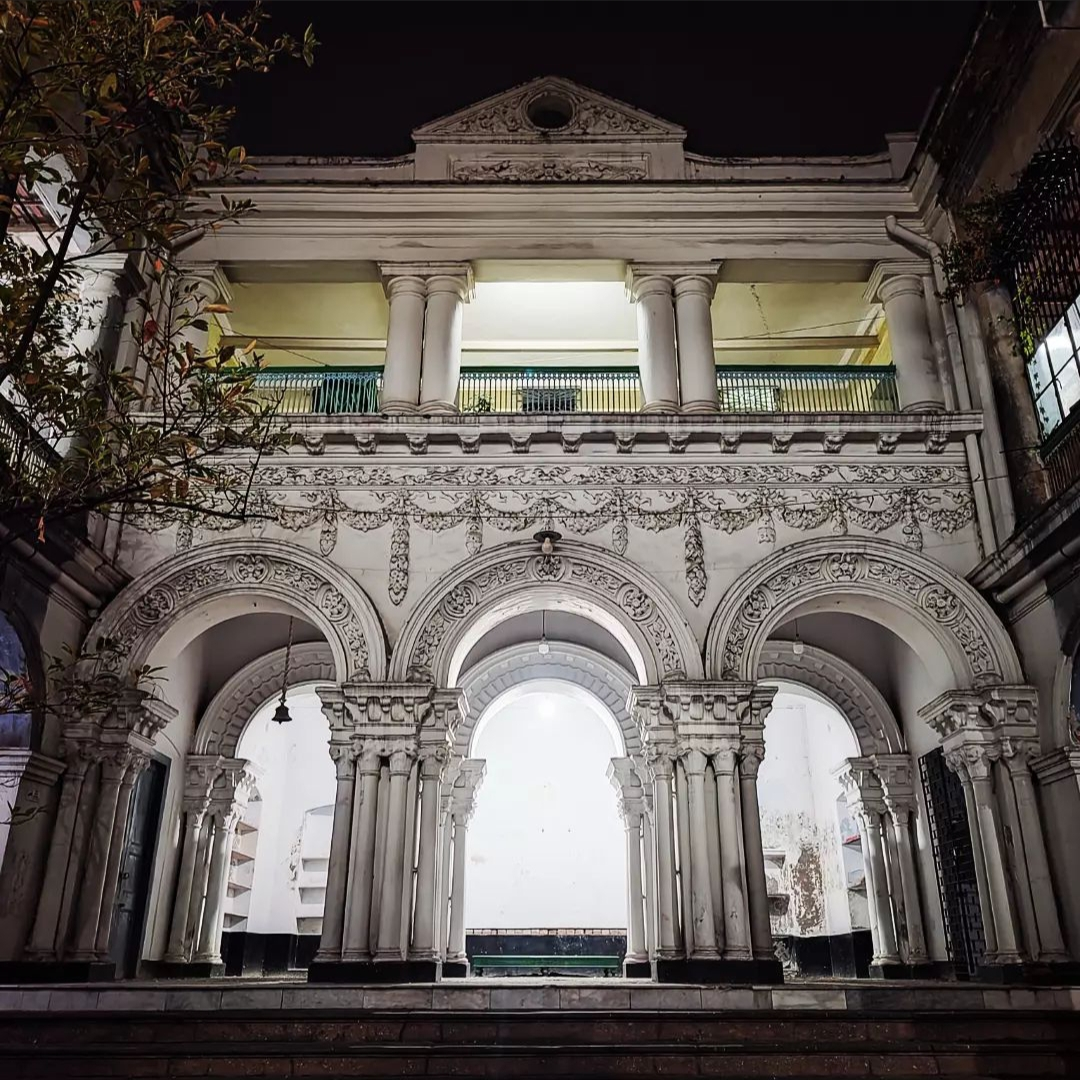
Janbazar Rajbati

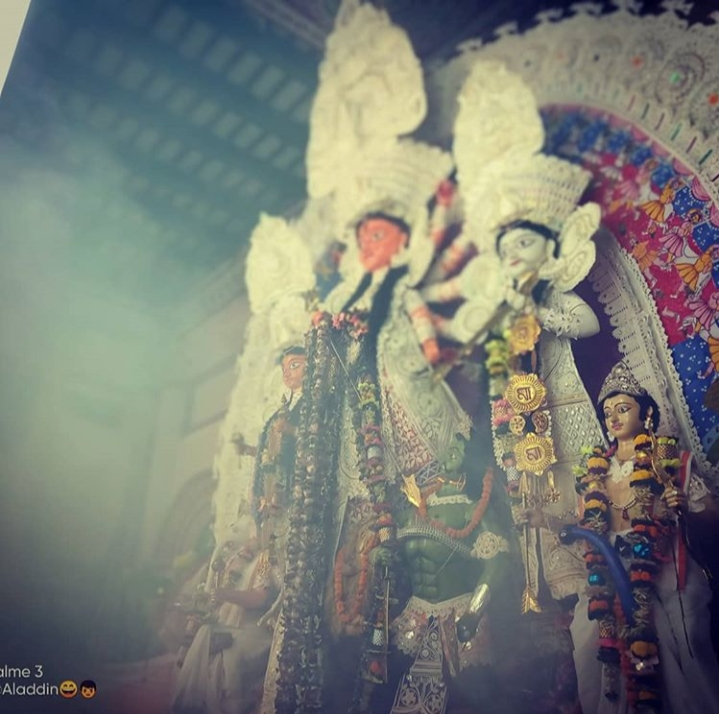
Durga Puja of the Marh family

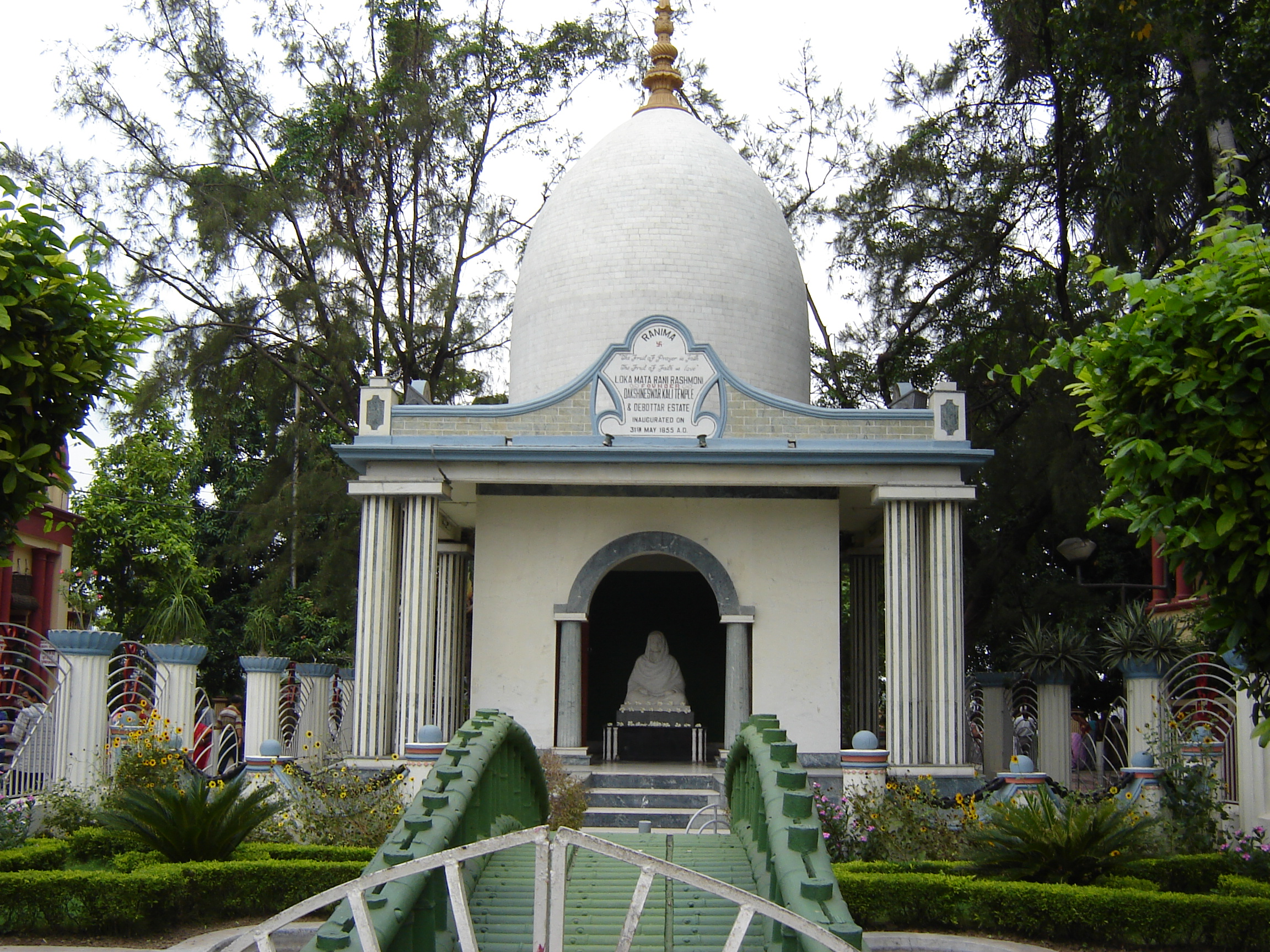
Rani Rashmoni's shrine near Dakshineswar

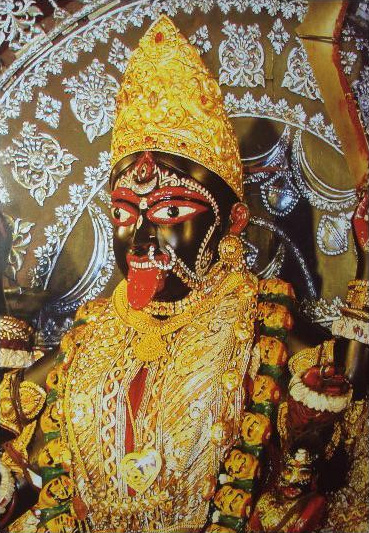
Dakshineswar Kali Mata (Jagadishwari/ Bhabatarini)

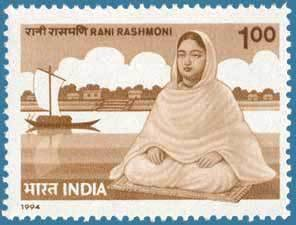
Stamp released by the Government of India

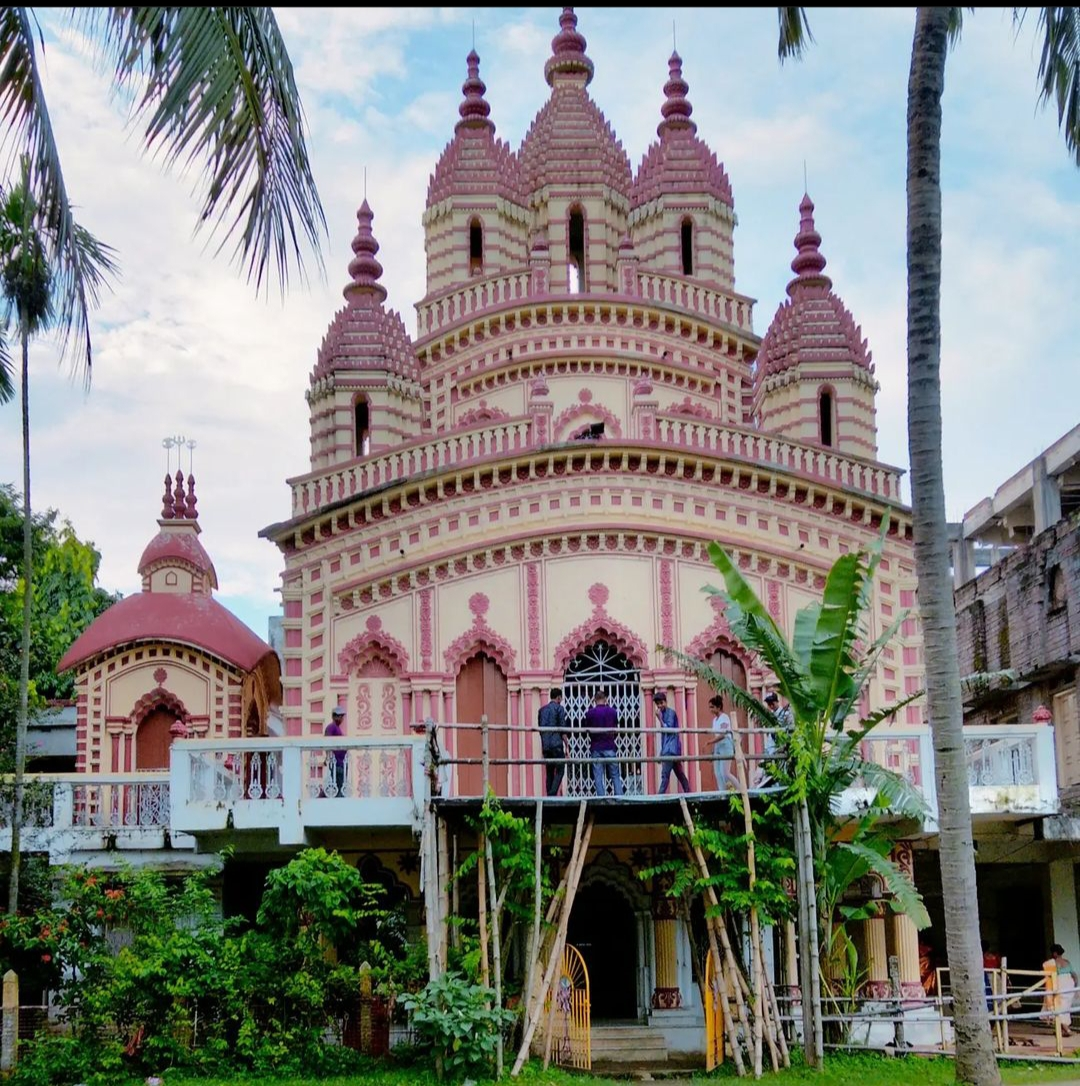
Replica of Dakshineswar Kali temple near Rani Rashmoni's birth place, CharNandanbati, Kalyani thana, Nadia, built by the family

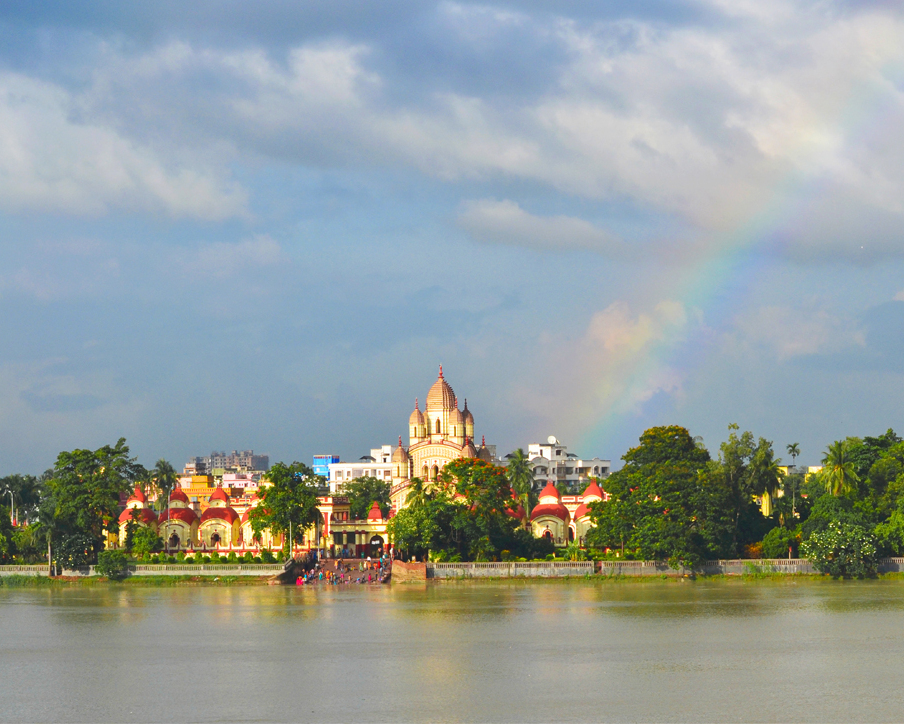
Dakshineshwar Kali Temple

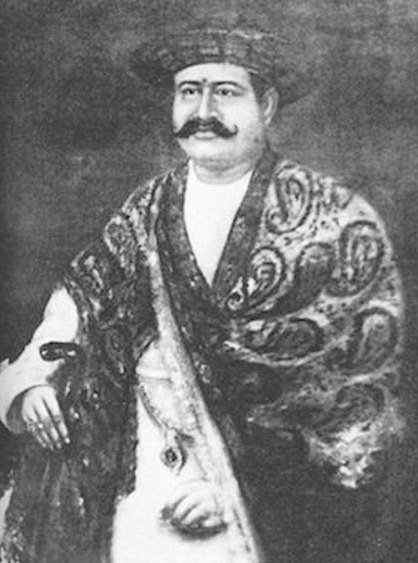
Portrait of Babu Mathur Mohan Biswas

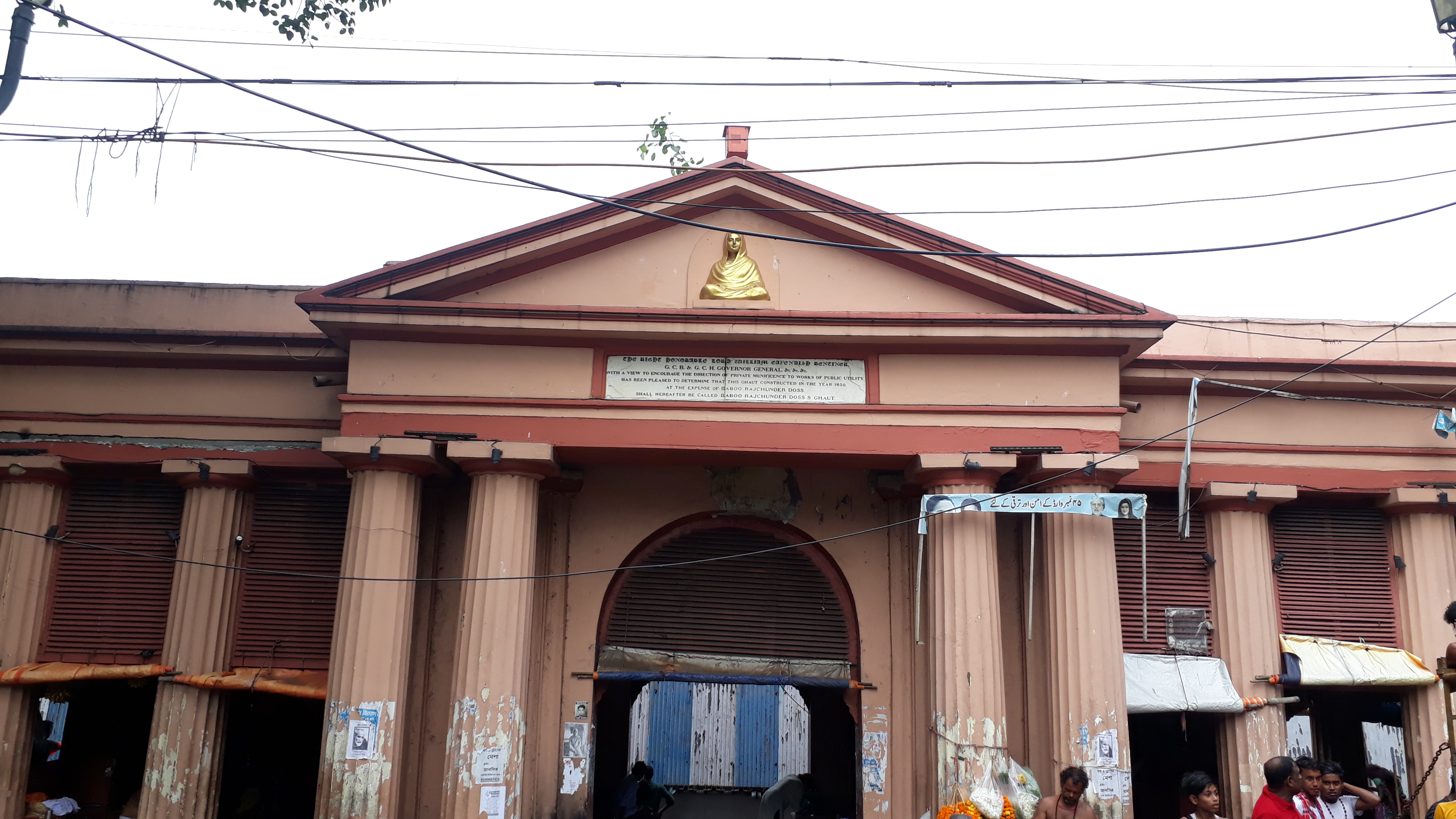
Babu Ghat built by Babu Rajchandra Das

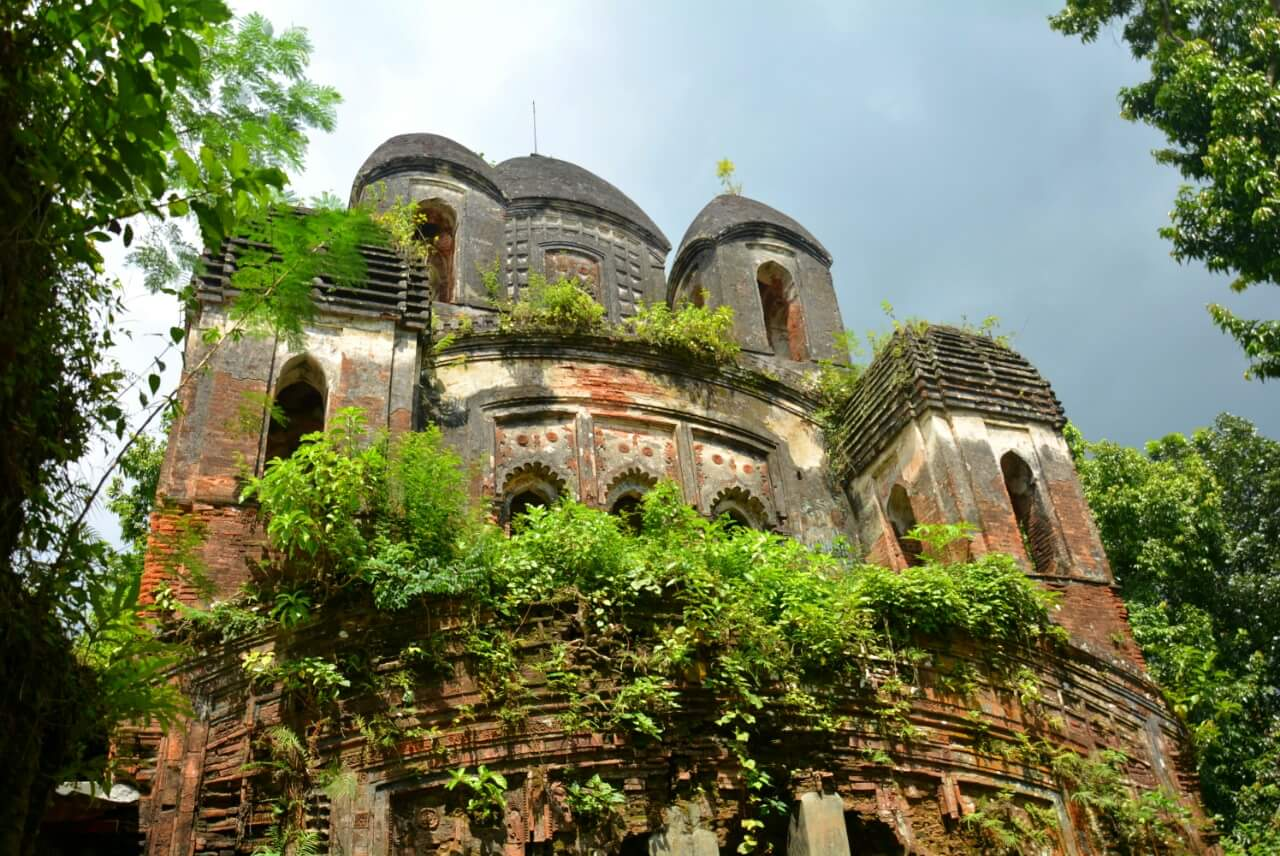
Ruins of the Shyam Sundar Jiu temple at Sonabere, Satkhira district, built by the ancestors of the Chowdhury family of Kumari Debi, later renovated by Rani Rashmoni

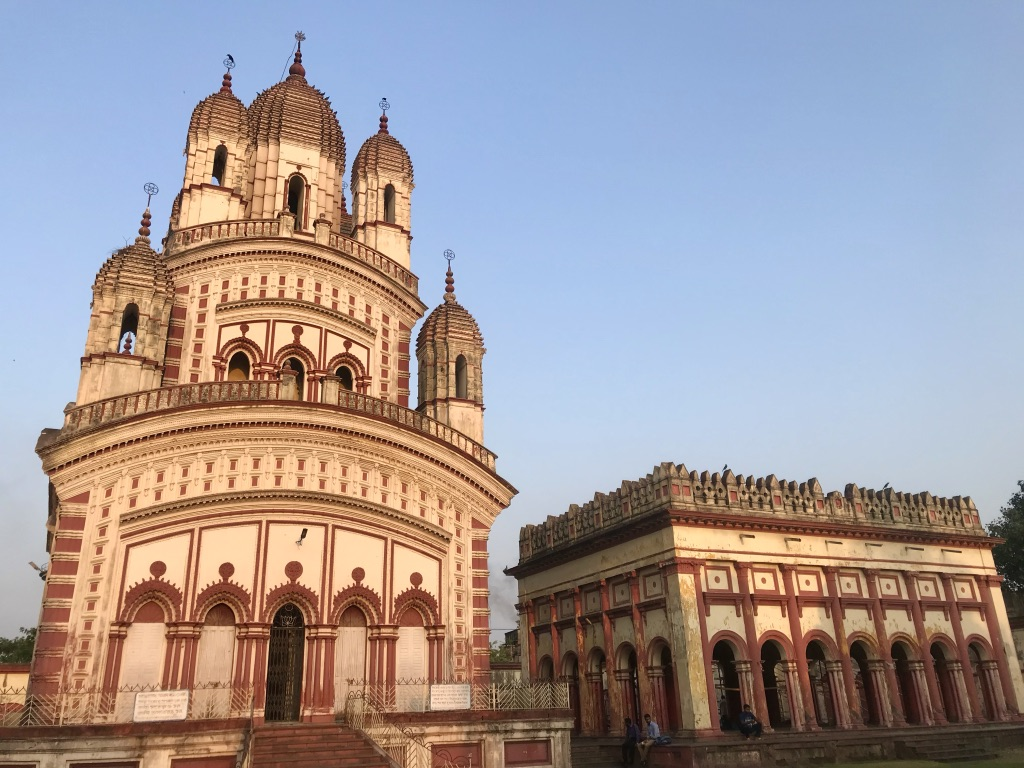
The Annapurna Temple, Titagarh was built by Dwarikanath Biswas, the son of Babu Mathurmohan Biswas and Jagadamba Debi

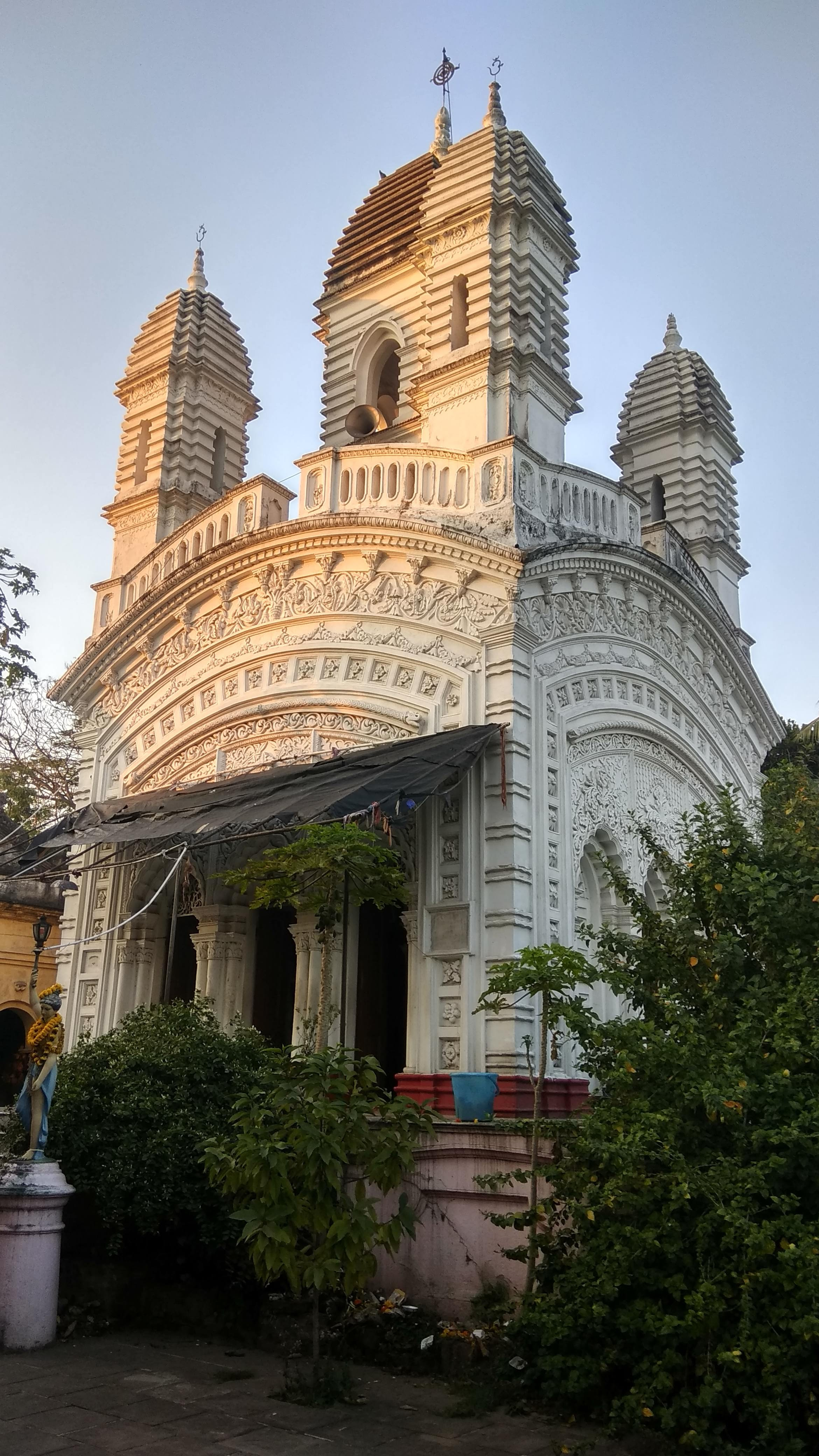
The Giribala Thakurbari, Agarpara was built by Giribala Debi, the grand daughter-in-law of Padmamoni Debi and Babu Ramchandra Ata.

== See also ==
- Rani Rashmoni
- Rajchandra Das
- Preetoram Marh
- Mathurmohan Biswas
- Dakshineswar Kali Temple
- Annapurna Temple, Titagarh
- Giribala Thakurbari, Agarpara
