= Mathurmohan Biswas =

Indian Zamindar, philanthropist and reformer (1817 - 1871)

Babu Mathur Mohan Biswas
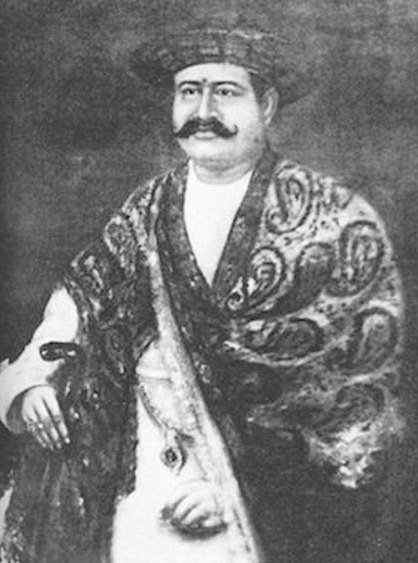
- Portrait of Babu Mathurmohan Biswas kept in the Janbazar Rajbari
- Born: 1817; Bithari Village, North 24 Parganas, British India
- Died: 16 July 1871 (aged 53–54); Kalighat, Kolkata, British India
- Education: Hindu College, Calcutta
- Spouse(s): Karunamayee Devi (Death- 1831); Jagadamba Biswas
- Children: Bhupal Chandra Biswas (Mother- Karunamayee), Dwarikanath, Trailokyanath, Thakurdas (Mother- Jagadamba)
- Father: Jaynarayan Biswas
- Family: Janbazar Raj

Babu Mathur Mohan Biswas or Babu Mathuranath Biswas (1817 – 16 July 1871), also known as Sejobabu, or simply, "Mathur Babu" was an Indian Zamindar, businessman, philanthropist and the third and youngest son-in-law of Rani Rashmoni. He was a devoted follower, disciple, attendant, and provider (rasaddar) of Shri Ramakrishna.

== Birth and early life ==
Mathur Mohan Biswas was born in the year 1817 in the village of Bithari, located in Swarupnagar, under the Basirhat subdivision of present-day North 24 Parganas district, West Bengal, then part of British India. He was born into a wealthy Mahishya family, who were the local Zamindars. Mathur Mohan was the youngest of five sons of Joynarayan Biswas. His ancestral home was originally in Sonabaria village, in what is now Satkhira, Bangladesh. He received his education at the Hindu College in Calcutta (now Kolkata), one of the most prestigious educational institutions of that time.

A photograph (1851) of The Hindu College of Calcutta

In 1827, Mathur Mohan Biswas married Karunamoyi, the third daughter of Babu Rajchandra Das and Rani Rashmoni. As Rajchandra’s third son-in-law, he became affectionately known as "Sejobabu". However, after Karunamoyi’s death in 1831, Rani Rashmoni arranged for Mathur Mohan to marry her youngest daughter, Jagadamba, in 1833. Following this, Rani Rashmoni kept him in her household and entrusted him with managing the Janbazar Raj’s administrative and financial affairs.

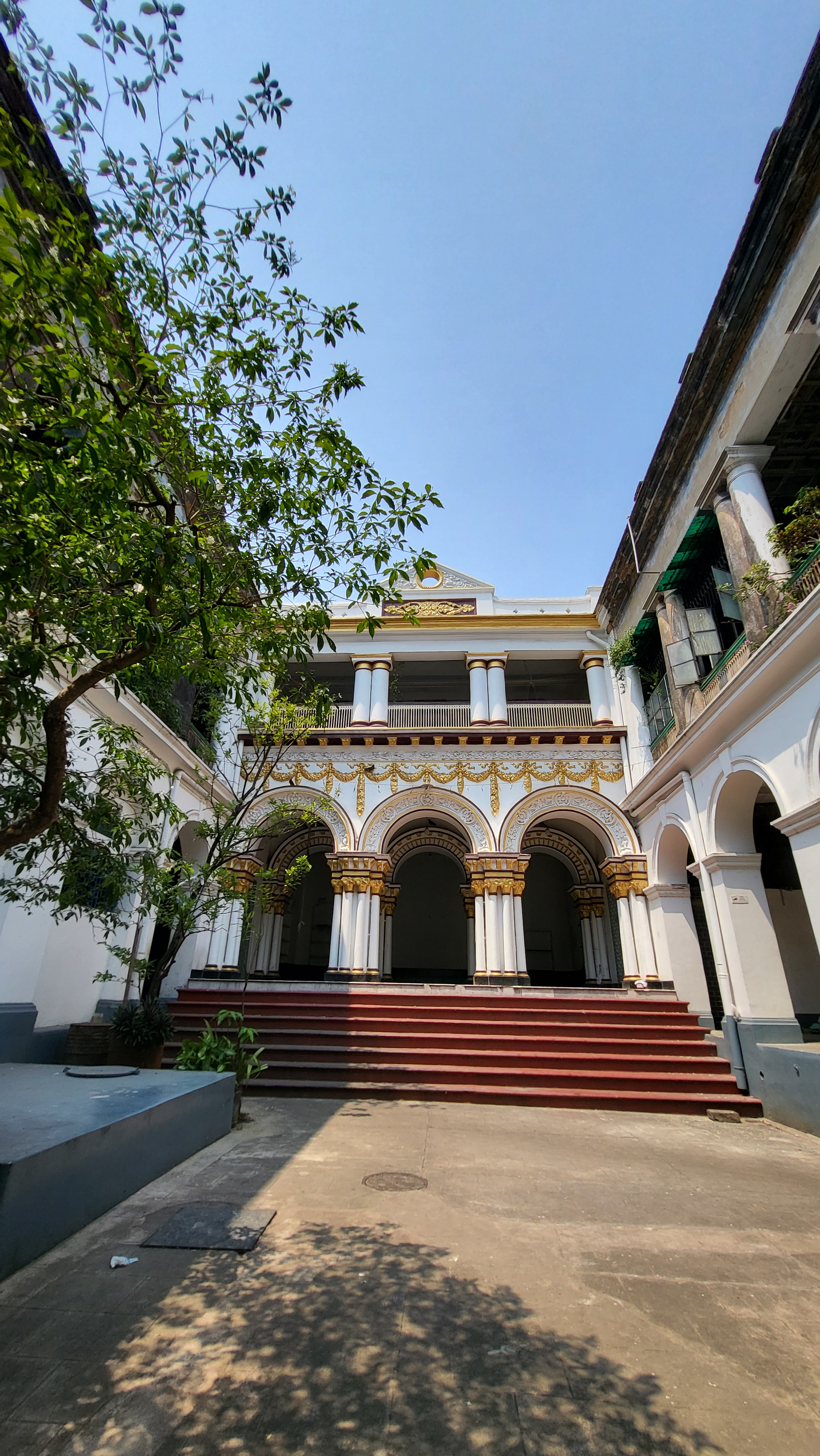
House of the Marh Family at Janbazar

At one point, Rani Rashmoni filed a legal case against Mathur Mohan, accusing him of misappropriating estate funds. However, she later withdrew the case, moved by her maternal affection and recognizing the practical needs of managing the zamindari (estate). In the years that followed, Mathur Mohan proved himself to be exceptionally loyal and capable in all responsibilities entrusted to him.

== Career ==
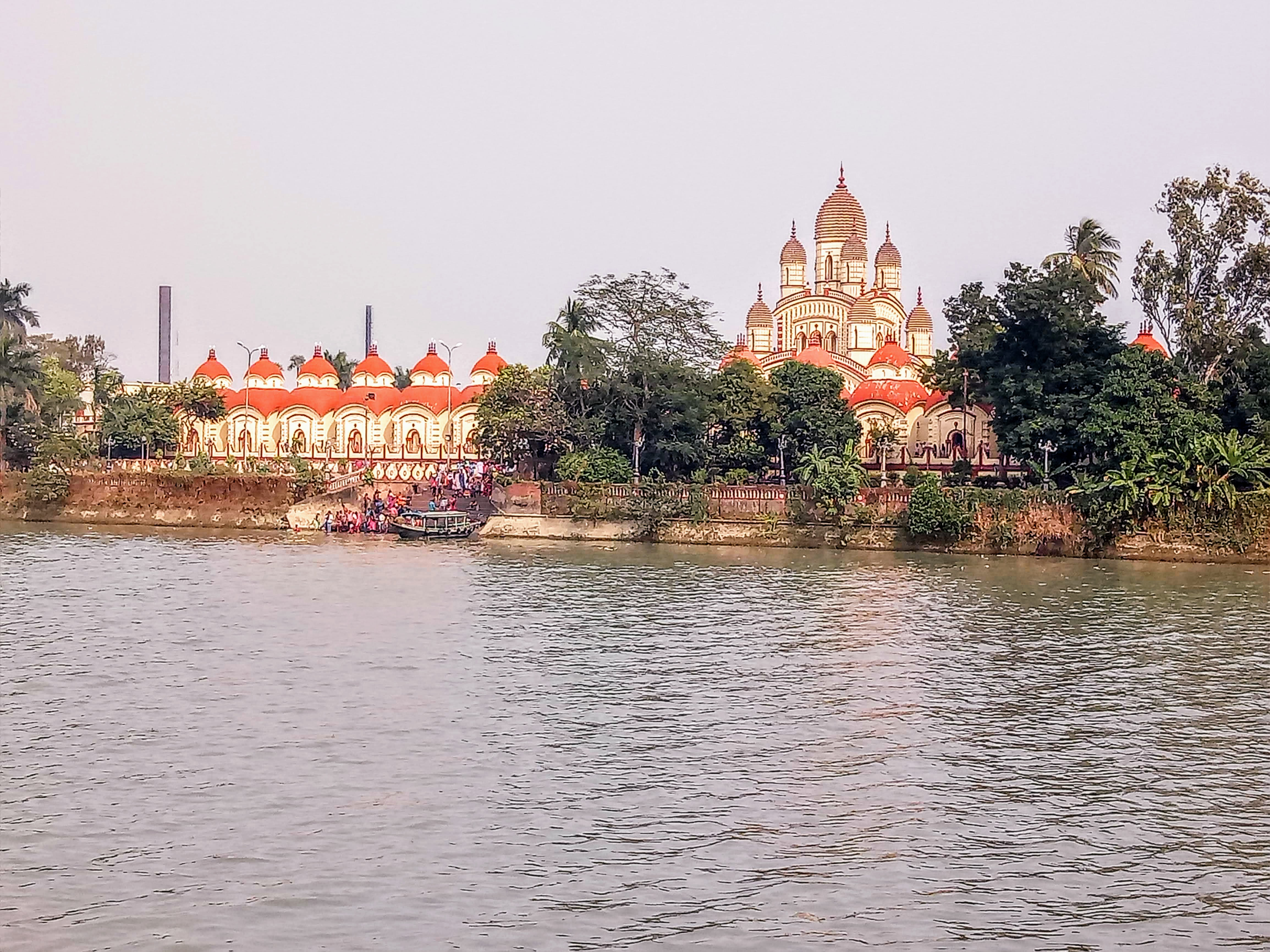
Dakshineswar Kali temple.

On 31 May 1855, after Rani Rashmoni established the Bhavatarini Kali Temple at Dakshineswar, it was Mathur Mohan Biswas, despite being educated in English and well-versed in Western rationality, who, with deep foresight, realism, and inner vision, recognized the spiritual greatness of Sri Ramakrishna. It was Mathur who appointed Sri Ramakrishna as the priest of the Bhavatarini Temple, and he went on to support all of Sri Ramakrishna’s spiritual practices with sincere devotion and commitment. For nearly eighteen years, Mathur served Sri Ramakrishna with unmatched dedication. With the approval of Rani Rashmoni, Mathur took care of Sri Ramakrishna’s food, clothing, shelter, personal security, and pilgrimage arrangements. His faith and devotion to Sri Ramakrishna were unwavering. Through logical reasoning and personal experiences, he became fully convinced of Sri Ramakrishna's divine incarnation, eventually surrendering himself at the feet of the Master, recognizing in him a true renunciate, free from all desire for lust and gold.

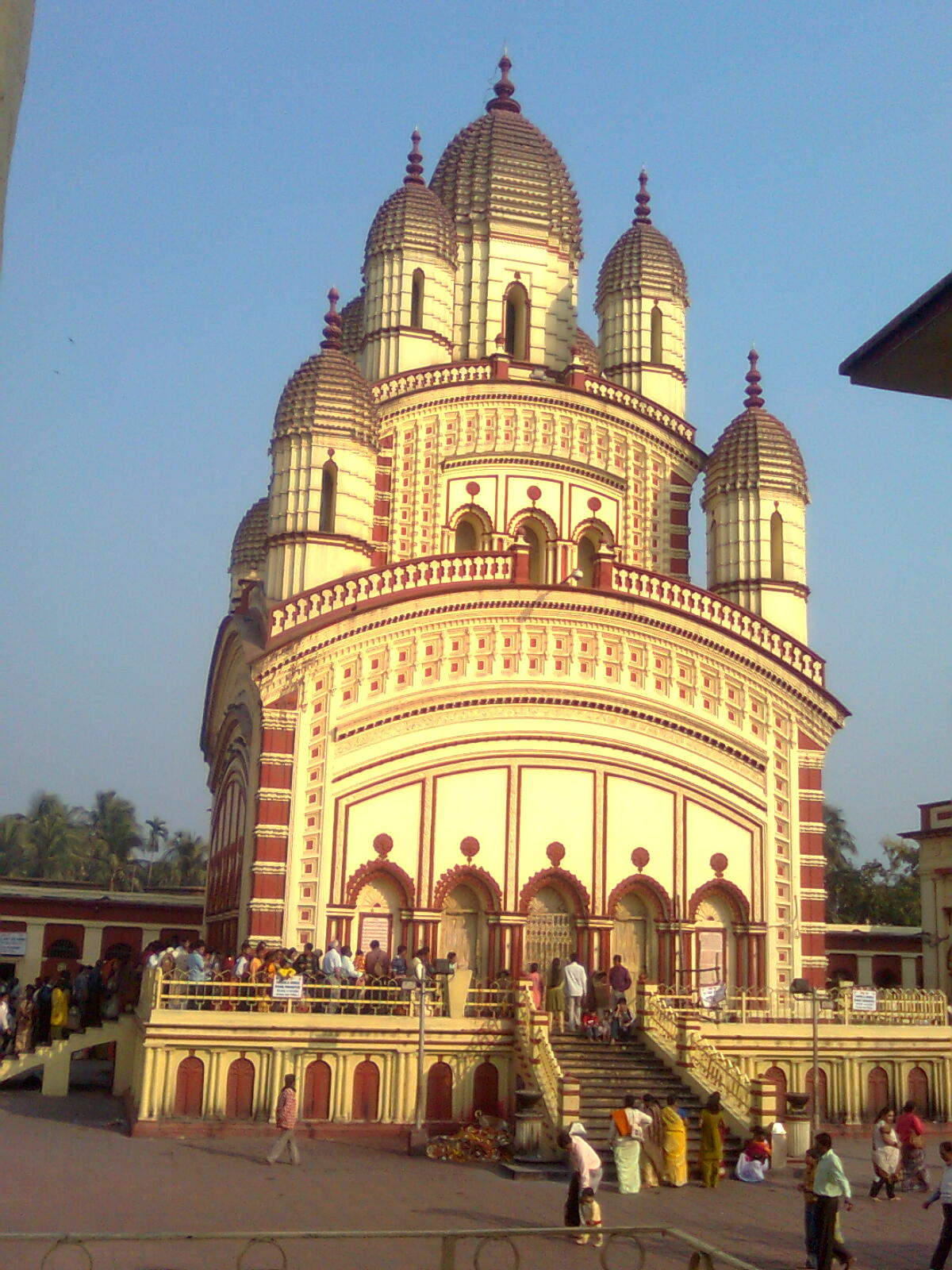
Dakshineswar Kali temple

On one occasion at Dakshineswar, Mathur had a divine vision of both Shiva and Kali simultaneously manifesting through Sri Ramakrishna's body. From that moment onward, he accepted the Master as his all-in-all, depending on him in every matter, both spiritual and worldly.

Mathur once said:

"আমার স্ত্রী, সন্তান, সম্পত্তি এবং পদমর্যাদা সবকিছুই অবাস্তব।একমাত্র শ্রীরামকৃষ্ণই বাস্তব।"

(Eng translation- "My wife, children, property, and status—none of these are real.

Only Sri Ramakrishna is real.")

— Mathurmohan Biswas

During the period when Sri Ramakrishna was engaged in spiritual pracitces at Dakshineswar, Mathurmohan Biswas provided financial and logistical assistance. Sources describe Biswas as an important supporter in facilitating Ramakrishna's activities.

During one phase of his sadhana, Sri Ramakrishna prayed to the Divine Mother Jagadamba, saying:—"মা,আমাকে শুকনো সাধু করিস নি,রসেবসে রাখিস।" (“Mother, do not make me a dry ascetic. Keep me immersed in divine rasa." Because Mathur Mohan took full responsibility for all the care and support during Sri Ramakrishna’s spiritual practices, the Master himself recognized Mathur Mohan as the chief provider (rasaddar) in the divine play (lila) of Jagadamba (Maa Kali of Dakshineswar).

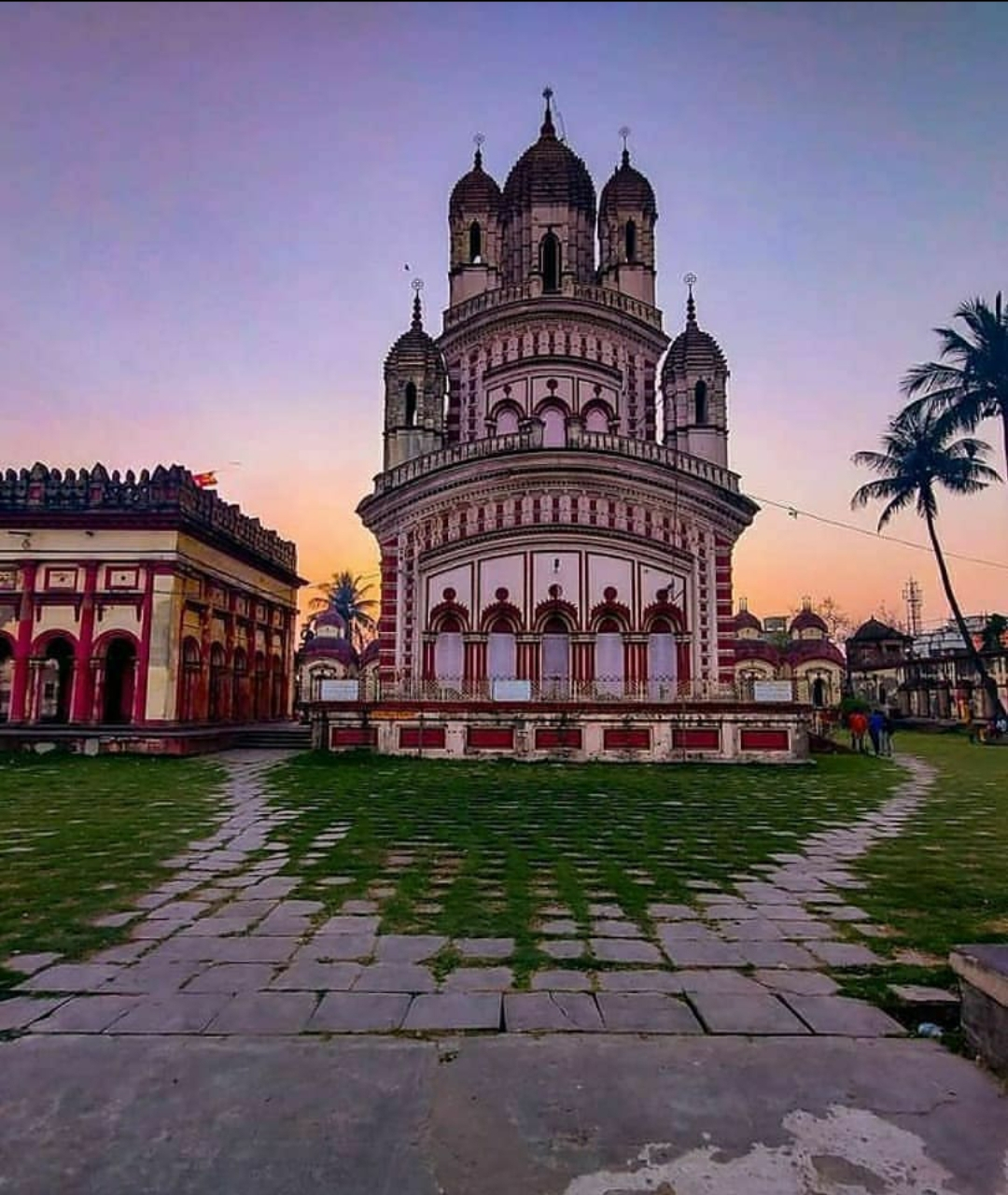
Annapurna Temple, Titagarh.

He, along with his wife Jagadamba and eldest son Dwarikanath, also helped to establish the Annapurna Temple in Titagarh, modelled after the Dakshineswar Kali Temple.

Swami Gambhirananda has mentioned about Mathuranath Biswas in his famous book "Sri Ramakrishna-Bhaktamalika" -

"মথুর বাবু ধনী অথচ উচ্চ প্রকৃতি সম্পন্ন, বিষয়ী হইলেও ভক্ত, হঠকারী হইয়াও বুদ্ধিমান, ক্রোধপরায়ণ হইলেও ধৈর্যশীল এবং ধীর প্রতিজ্ঞ ছিলেন। তিনি ইংরেজিবিদ্যাভিজ্ঞ ও তার্কিক, কিন্তু কেহ কোন কথা বুঝাইয়া দিতে পারিলে, উহা বুঝিয়াও বুঝিবে না — এমন স্বভাব সম্পন্ন ছিলেন না। তিনি ঈশ্বর বিশ্বাসী ও পরমভক্ত ছিলেন। (Eng translation - "Mathur Babu was wealthy yet possessed a noble character. Though involved in worldly matters, he was a true devotee. Despite being quick-tempered, he was patient and steadfast. He was well-versed in English education and logic, but he was not the kind of person who, when someone explained something, would refuse to understand. He was a firm believer in God and a devoted follower.")

== Death ==
Mathur Mohan Biswas died on 16 July 1871 (1st Shravan, 1278 Bengali calendar) at 5 PM in Kalighat, Kolkata, at the age of 54.

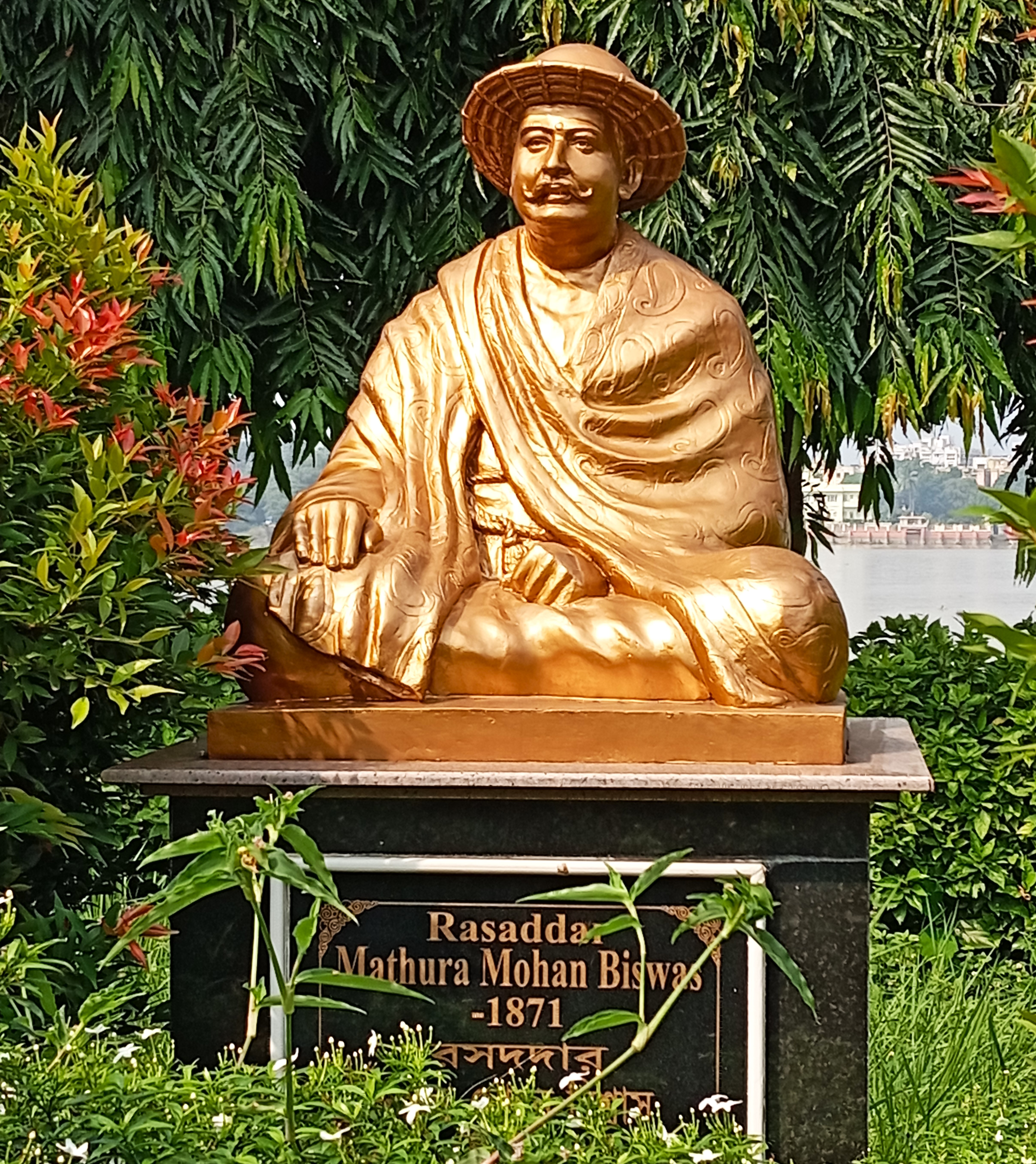
Statue of Mathurmohan Biswas, Dakshineswar Kali Temple complex, North 24 Parganas, West Bengal, India

At the time of Mathur’s passing, Sri Ramakrishna was in deep samadhi (spiritual trance) for several hours, praying for Mathur’s successful spiritual journey. Remarkably, immediately after Mathur’s death, Sri Ramakrishna’s samadhi was broken, and he commented:

"শ্রীশ্রীজগদম্বার সখীগণ মথুরকে সাদরে দিব্যরথে উঠালেন — তার তেজ শ্রীশ্রীদেবীলোকে গেল।" (Eng translation- "The divine companions of Sri Sri Jagadamba respectfully received Mathur onto the celestial chariot — his spirit ascended to the abode of the Divine Mother.")

== Descendants ==
His descendants have split into two families. The Biswases of 18 Rani Rashmoni road and the Hazras of 13 Rani Rashmoni road. Both the branches separately organize their own Durga Puja, which is attended by many people across the city.

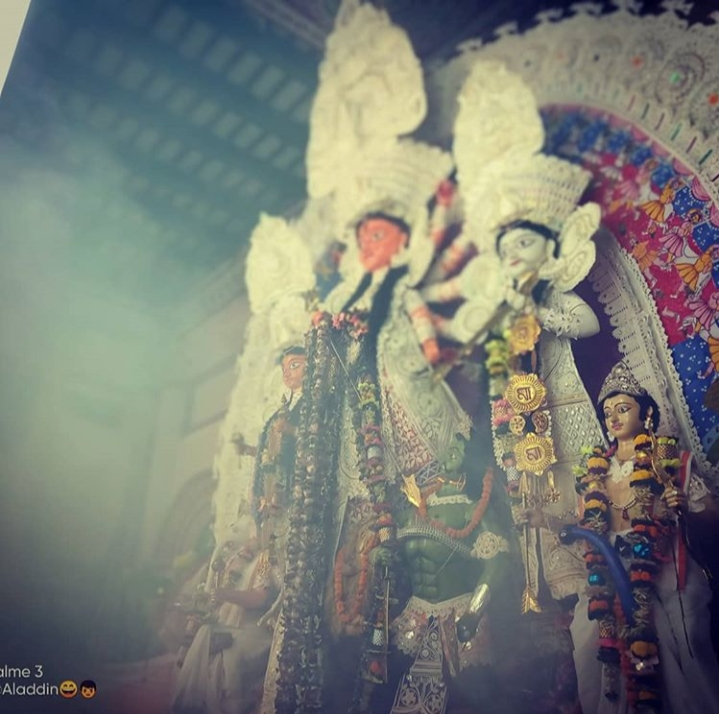
Durga puja at the Janbazar Raj Palace
