= Walsh, Lovett and Co. =

Birmingham-based construction

Walsh, Lovett & Co.
- Defunct: 1902-06-18
- Headquarters: Birmingham, England
- Area served: South America, India
- Key people: Thomas Acquin Martin, Thomas Salter Pyne, Thomas Bernard Hall
- Products: Metals, construction material
- Services: Contracting
- Subsidiaries: Martin & Co.

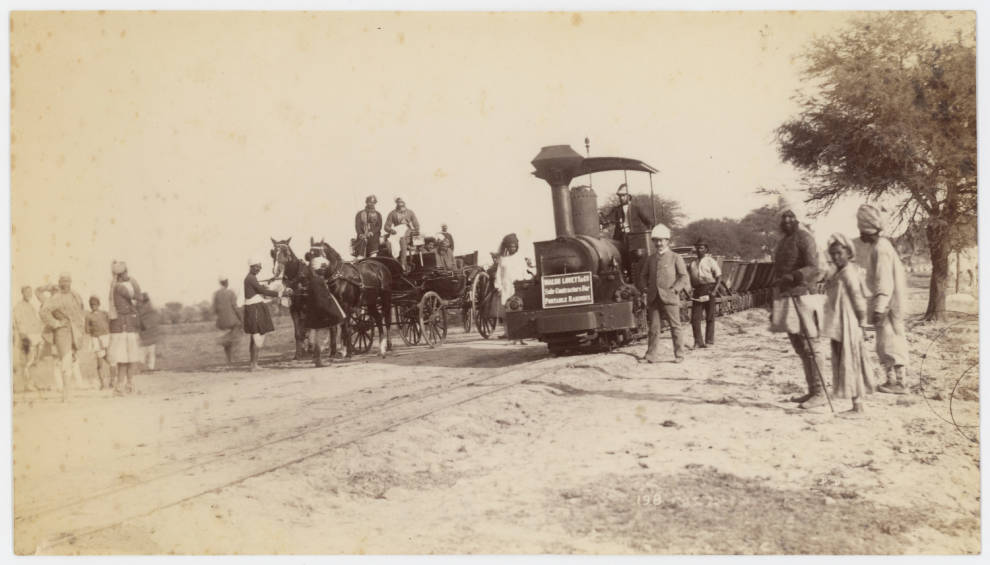
Smithie inspecting a portable railway in Maharashtra

Walsh, Lovett & Co. was a Birmingham firm that dealt in metals and construction material in South America and opened a branch in Calcutta in 1874. The registered offices of the company were in No. 10, Ludgate-Hill in the city of Birmingham.

As a contractor, they carried out large waterworks at Bombay and other locations. The Calcutta branch was initially managed by Thomas Acquin Martin, who subsequently founded the firm Martin & Co. Thomas Salter Pyne worked for Walsh, Lovett and Co. in 1886. In 1887 Thomas Bernard Hall went to India to superintend the large contracts carried out by Walsh, Lovett & Co. in connection with the waterworks at Bombay and elsewhere. For health reasons, he returned to England in 1890, but he continued to inspect the machinery in connection with these contracts prior to its dispatch to India, until his retirement.

At an extraordinary general meeting of the members of the company on 18 June 1902, the resolution was passed that the company could not continue its business and accordingly the company wound up voluntarily.
