= Statue of Lord Cornwallis =

Statue of Lord Cornwallis may refer to:

- The statue of Lord Cornwallis in St. Paul's Cathedral, London,
- The statue of Lord Cornwallis in the Fort Museum, Fort St. George, Chennai
- The statue of Lord Cornwallis in the Victoria Memorial, Kolkata
