= Cuthbert Thomas Martin =

British Army officer (born 1877)

Brigadier-General Cuthbert Thomas Martin DSO*
- Born: December 1877
- Died: 27 May 1918 (aged 40) France

Brigadier-General Cuthbert Thomas Martin, DSO* (December 1877 – 27 May 1918) was a British Army officer. He was killed by a shell during the Third Battle of the Aisne while commanding the 151st (Durham Light Infantry) Brigade. Brigadier-General Edward Riddell, who was with him, was wounded at the same time.

== Biography ==
Martin was the son of Sir Acquin Martin and Lady Martin.

He joined the British Army when he was commissioned a second lieutenant in the Highland Light Infantry on 15 May 1897, and with the 1st Battalion of his regiment took part in the occupation of Crete in 1898. Serving in South Africa during the Second Boer War, he took part in the battles of Modder River (November 1899), Magersfontein (December 1899), Koodoosberg, Retief's Nek, and Witpoort (July 1900). He was promoted to lieutenant while in South Africa, on 11 February 1900.
