= Rajendra Nath Mookerjee =

Bengali Indian industrialist

Sir Rajen Mookerjee
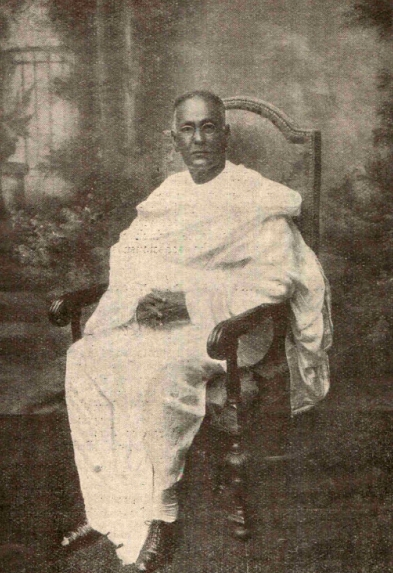
- Born: 23 June 1854; Bhabla, Basirhat, Bengal Presidency, British India
- Died: 15 May 1936 (aged 81); Kolkata, West Bengal, India
- Occupation: Industrialist

Sir Rajendra Nath Mookerjee KCIE KCVO (or Rajen Mookerjee; 23 June 1854 – 15 May 1936) was a pioneering Bengali Indian industrialist.

== Early life ==
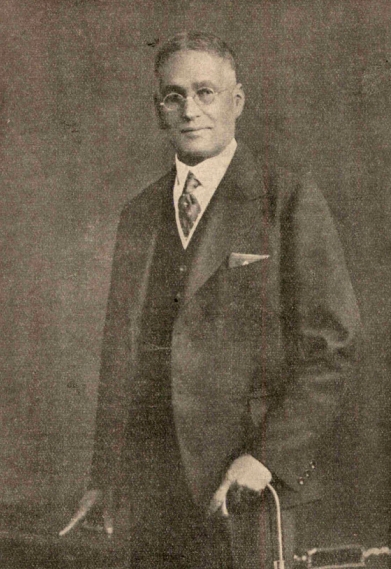

Rajendra Nath Mookerjee was raised by his mother after his father died when he was six. He studied engineering for three years at present day Indian Institute of Engineering Science and Technology, Shibpur then located at Presidency College, Calcutta. His classmate and friend was Gagan Chandra Biswas, whom he later appointed as the Chief Engineer of his company. He started as a contractor and later earned fame as an engineer and businessman.

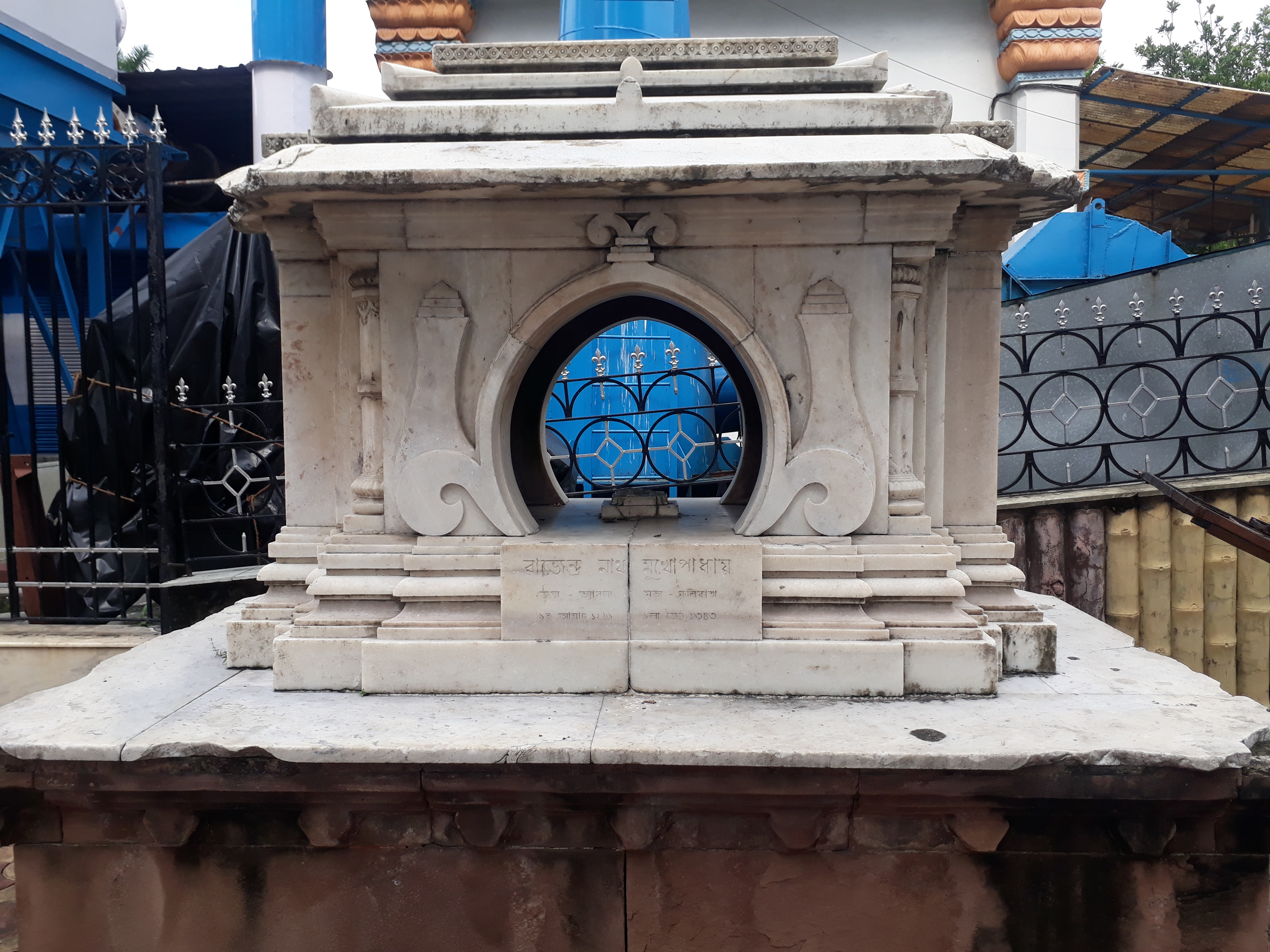
Memorial Plaque of Rajendra Nath Mukherjee in Keoratala

== Achievements ==
Along with Sir Thomas Acquin Martin, he founded Martin & Co. and contributed to the success of Bengal Iron at Kulti. Undertaken Burn & Company, and Jessop after his company's huge success. Later he joined G.H.Fairhurst in founding the iron works of The Indian Iron and Steel Company at Burnpur. Present Day's Garden Reach Ship Builders and Hooghly Dock are also his contributions. Among his achievements were the construction of Palta water works and the Victoria Memorial and Howrah Bridge(Old) at Kolkata, Later His Company developed the Bridge in 1945 to a Cantilever Bridge which is now called as Rabindra Setu. He pioneered the laying down and operations of Martin's Light Railways. He visited England for the first time in 1901 and later several times more in connection with his business.

Beside being a successful businessman, he helped in the foundation of Indian Statistical Institute (ISI) at Kolkata along with Prasanta Chandra Mahalanobis. He also served as its first President for initial three years(1932-35).

== Honours and awards ==
In 1908, Mookerjee was appointed a Companion of the Order of the Indian Empire (CIE). In 1911, he became sheriff of Kolkata. Also in 1911, he was knighted with the KCIE. In 1922, Mookerjee was further honoured with the dignity of a Knight Commander of the Royal Victorian Order (KCVO). In 1931, the University of Calcutta honoured him with an honorary D.Sc. (Engineering). He presided over the 8th session of Indian Science Congress held at Kolkata in 1921.

== Personal life ==
Mookerjee was married when he was still in his early teens to eleven-year-old Jadumati Devi, a girl of his own caste and similar background, in a match arranged by their families. They had three sons:

1. Jitendra Nath Mookerjee was his eldest son
2. Sir Biren Mookerjee, the second son
3. Mahendra Nath Mookerjee was his youngest son

His grandsons, Ramen Mookerjee and Robin Mookerjee, took over the reins of Martin Burn & Co. after the death of his sons.

== Monuments ==
A main thoroughfare in Kolkata is named after him as Rajendra Nath Mukherjee Road abbreviated as R. N. Mukherjee Road, earlier known as Mission Row. A statue of Sir R.N. Mukherjee was situated in Victoria Memorial premises.
