= Gagan Chandra Biswas =

Indian industrialist, landlord and engineer (1849–1936)

Babu Gagan Chandra Biswas
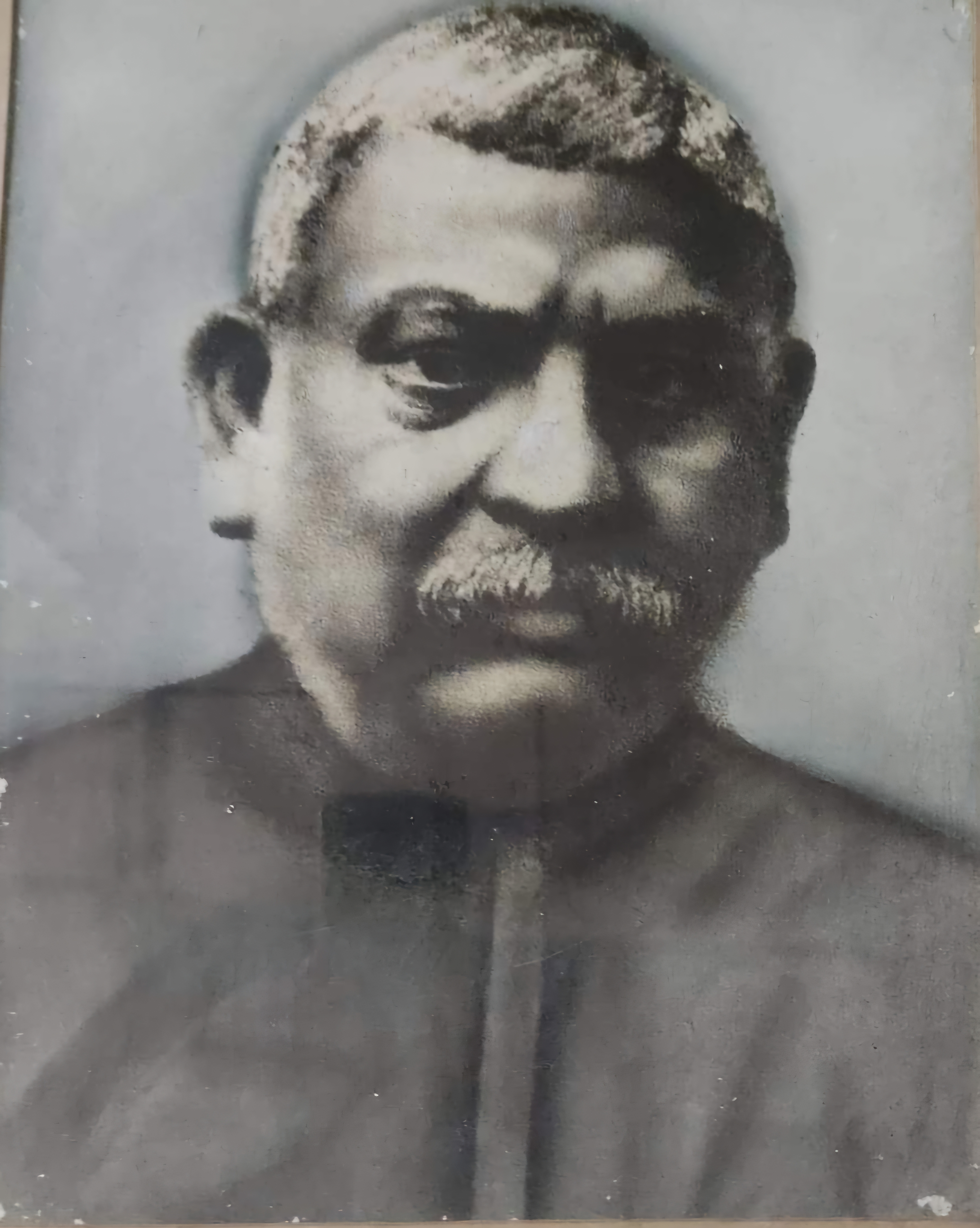
- Born: 1849; Madhabpur, Nadia district, Bengal Presidency, British India
- Died: 1936 (aged 86–87); Calcutta, Bengal Province, British India
- Citizenship: British Raj
- Education: Krishnagar Government College; Presidency College, Calcutta; B. E. College, Shibpur
- Occupations: Engineer, Industrialist, Social reformer, Zamindar
- Organization: Indian National Congress
- Spouse: Sarbosundari Debi
- Family: Zamindar Biswas Family of Madhabpur

Babu Gagan Chandra Biswas (1849–1936), was a Bengali industrialist, engineer and social worker. He was also involved in the political movements of Bengal, he was one of the earliest leaders of the Indian independence movement. Being among the premier early members of the Indian National Congress from Bengal, he attended many sessions of the Congress centred around Bengal. As an engineer, he built numerous landmarks and drew plans for multiple buildings of the contemporary era. As one of the most prominent Zamindars of the region, he also had substantial contributions in social works in his native district of Nadia.

== Early life ==
Gagan Chandra Biswas was born in 1850 in the village of Madhabpur near Krishnanagar in Nadia district in an aristocratic Mahishya family to Pandit Srimanta Biswas and Nanibala Debi. His father was a great scholar in Sanskrit, Arabic and Persian. Gagan Chandra was the only son of his father. He was the son of a very prominent Mahishya Zamindar family of Nadia district of Bengal. Their family was one of the few families titled by the Nawab of Bengal. The Nawab bestowed upon them the title of "Biswas". Gagan Chandra displayed extraordinary academic talent from childhood. In childhood, he got a scholarship from the village school, passed the entrance examination from Krishnanagar Government College, being the first in his class and subsequently received a scholarship. He passed the F.A. examination from Presidency College, Calcutta and studied engineering in the B. E. College in Shibpur. He was part of the first batch which graduated out of B. E. College. He was one of the most meritorious students of University of Calcutta of the time, securing second place in the engineering examination and became a great favorite of Professor Satcliffe of Presidency College. His classmate and close friend was Sir Rajendra Nath Mookherjee.

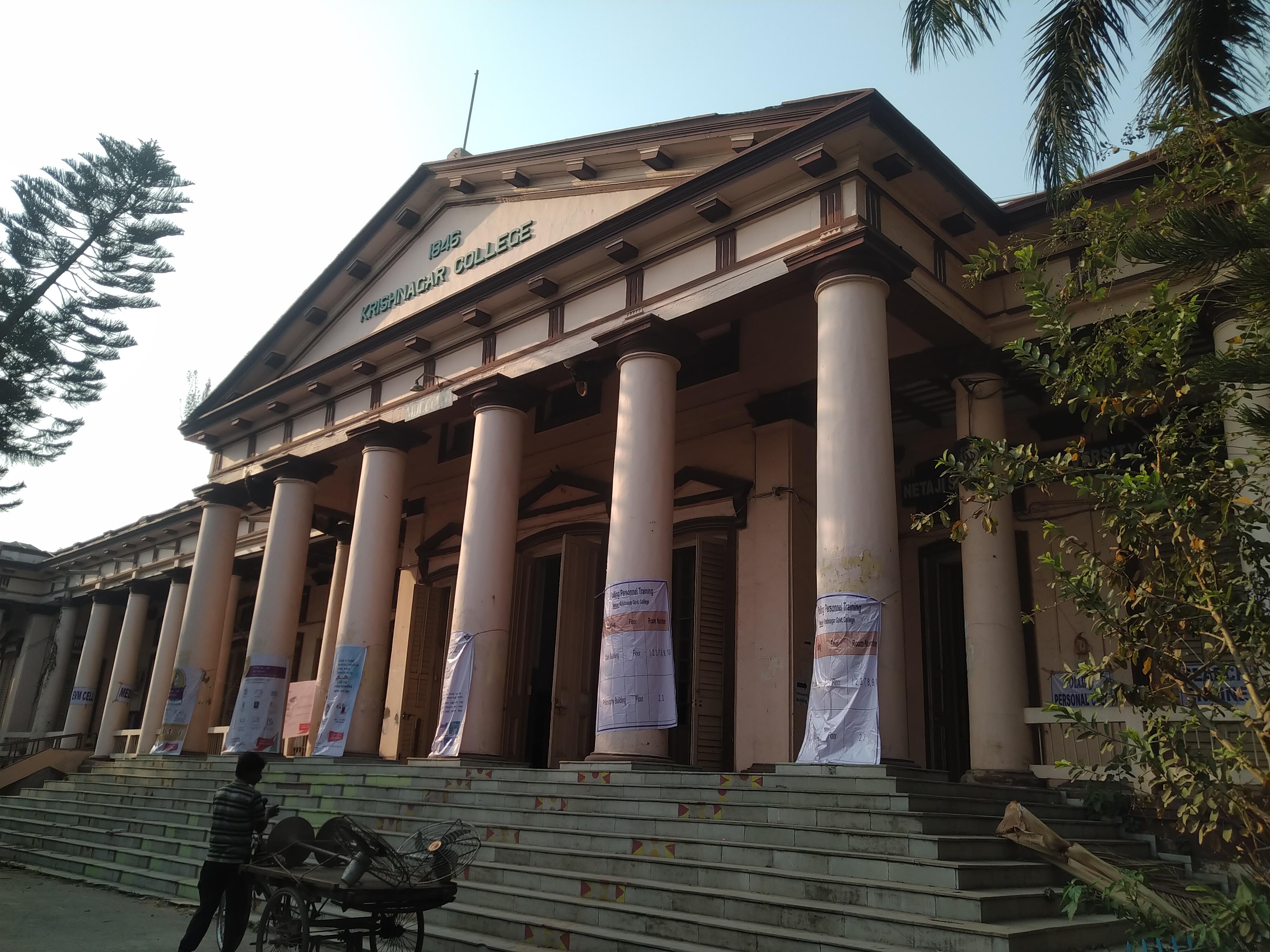
The Krishnanagar Government College

== Career ==
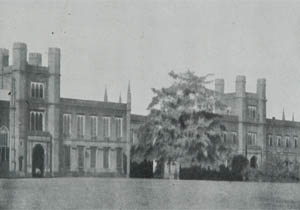
Bengal Engineering College, Howrah

After completing his education, Gagan Chandra worked as a chief engineer in the office of the Matin Burn Company founded by Sir Rajendra. After passing his engineering degree, he served two years of apprenticeship as per government rules, he was the District Engineer of Jalpaiguri district and the Executive Engineer for Rajshahi Division. During this time, as a Government official he was responsible for the creation of the railway line between Paunia and Rangpur. He also designed the old Jalpaiguri railway station. In 1899, using Screw piling, he accomplished the nearly impossible objective of building a railway bridge over Teesta River. Moreover, he was enlisted for the construction of the Tihari way to Tibet for the British expedition to Tibet. Subsequently, he established a Standard Engineering firm himself, which was responsible for major projects in Hooghly district and other places. He can rightfully be called a pioneer in the engineering industry of Bengal.

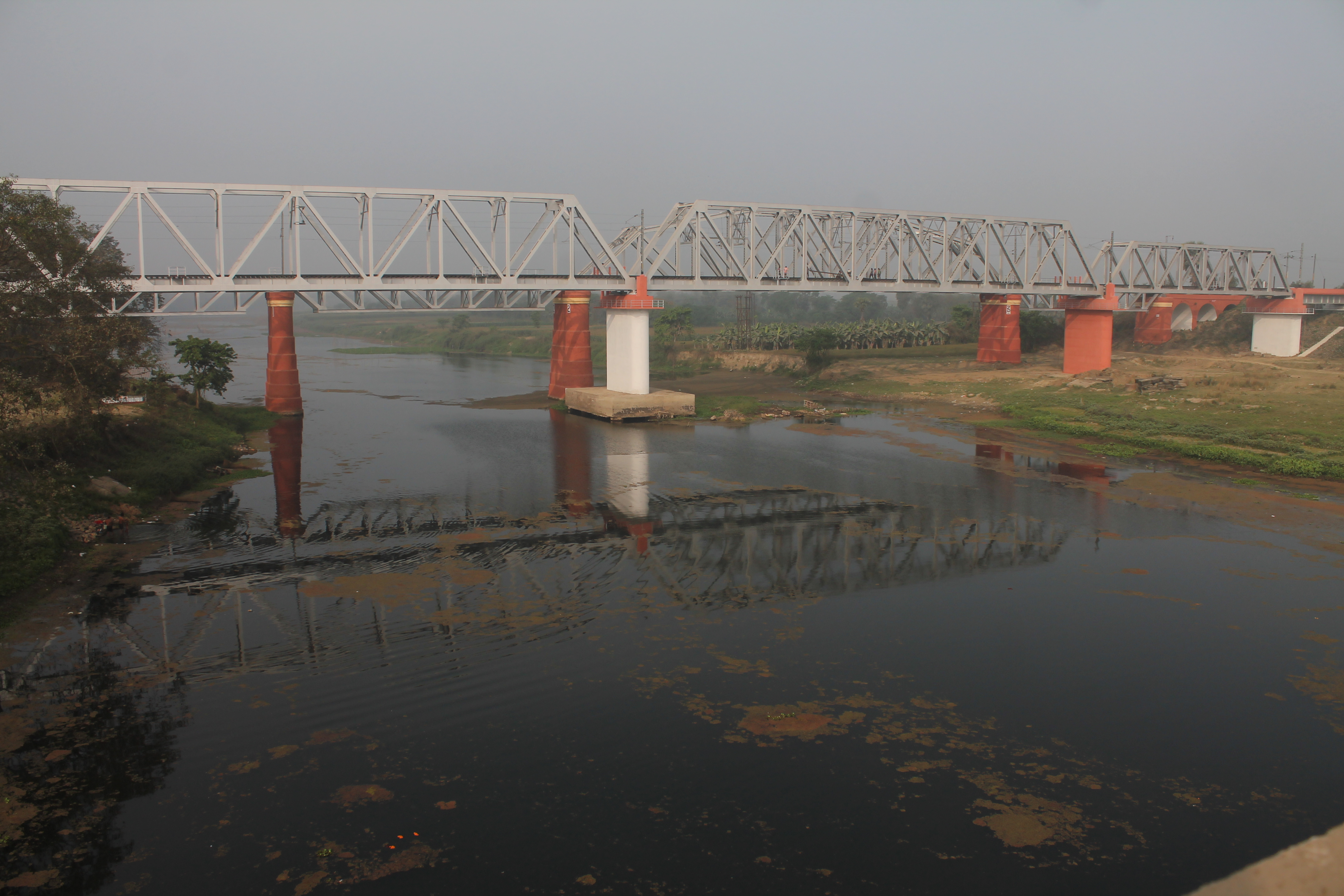
The Railway bridge over Jalangi River.

His firm had won a tender of 9 lakh rupees at that time for the construction of a railway bridge over the Jalangi River in Krishnanagar. During the construction of the bridge, he protested against the insulting behavior of the high-ranking British officials who came on behalf of the government, and as a result, he became a victim of a conspiracy. As a result of the conspiracy, the British official damaged the bridge. He admitted immense loss and demolished the bridge and rebuilt it at his own expense. To compensate for this loss, he had to sell his house in Kolkata, the tea garden in Jalpaiguri and some properties in Nadia. Journalist Shishir Kumar Ghosh mentioned this incident in Amritbazar Patrika and highly praised Gagan Chandra's bright and strong character. He built a bridge over the Jalda Teesta Jaldhaka River using screw piling, and he also designed the building of Surendranath College, at the behest of Surendranath Banerjee himself. He was the architect of the Radha Gobind Jiu Temple in Agarpara. Biswas also donated lots of land for expansion of railway line in Nadia. He was the first Bengali to establish a tea garden on a commercial basis. He owned as many as eight tea estates in Darjeeling.

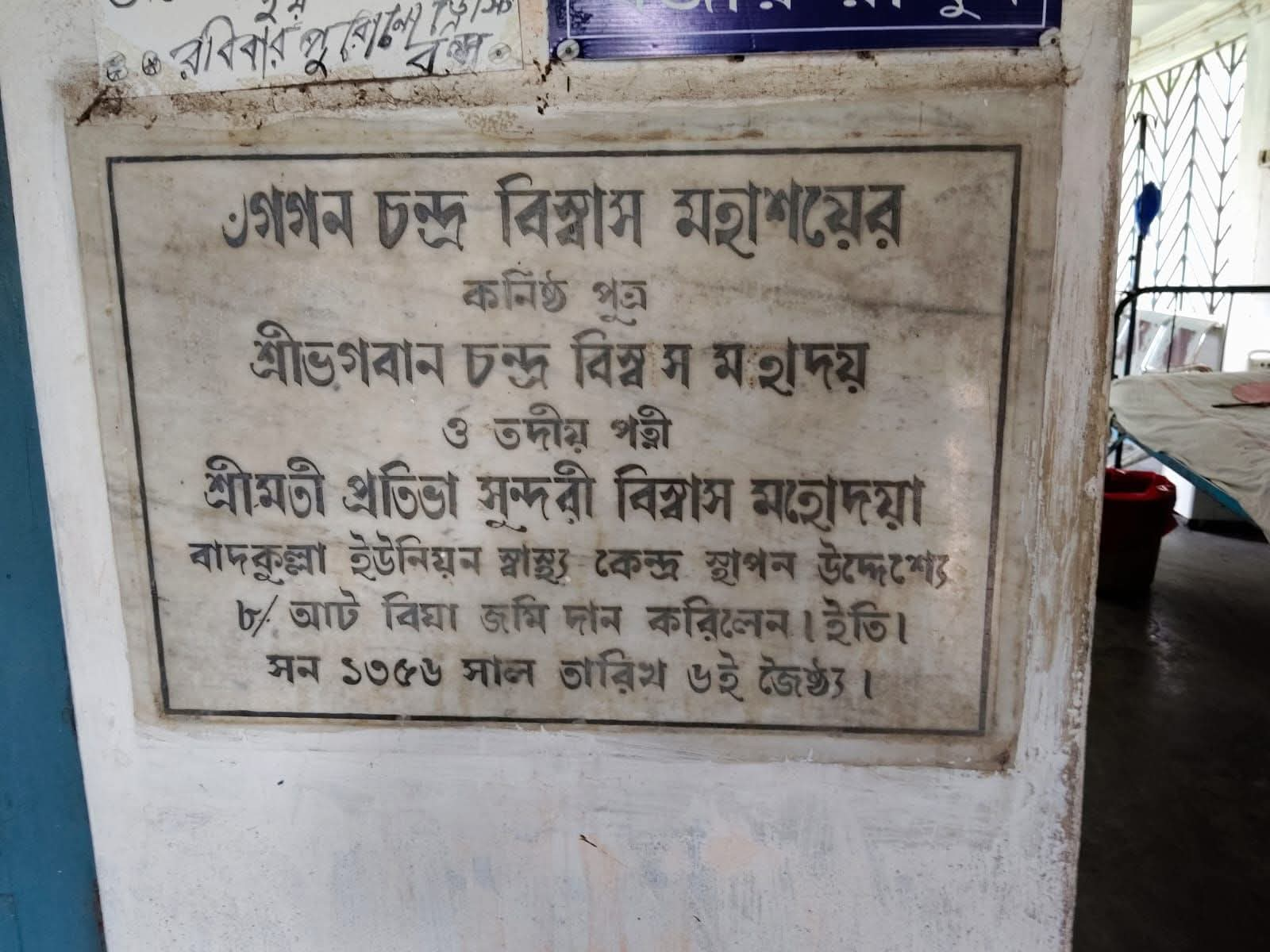
Gagan Chandra Biswas had donated 500 bighas to the railway company to establish a railway station in Badkulla, Nadia district. Later his youngest son, Bhagaban Chandra Biswas, donated 8 bighas of land, on the 8th of Jaishtha, 1956, for the establishment of Badkulla Union Health Centre.

He also, established an English-medium school in his native village of Madhabpur, called the Shrimanta M. I. School, named after his father, which was attended by revolutionary Basanta Kumar Biswas. He donated land and money for the development of the Badkulla area of Nadia, which came under his Zamindari estate. He also established the first Library, Post office and a Primary school in Badkulla. He had founded his palace on the left side of the Anjana river. He also donated the land on which the Badkulla railway station stands. The "Gagan Babu Bazaar", a bazaar, at Badkulla was founded by him. He was associated with the University of Calcutta, serving as both its paper setter as well as its paper examiner for disciplines like Physics and Mathematics. He was a colleague of Surendranath Banerjee, Bhupendra Nath Bose, Jatramohan Sen, Ambica Charan Mazumdar, etc. in the early era of political movements in Bengal and was a foremost early politician of the Indian National Congress. He was a member of the Bengal Legislative Council for 30 years.

== Personal life ==
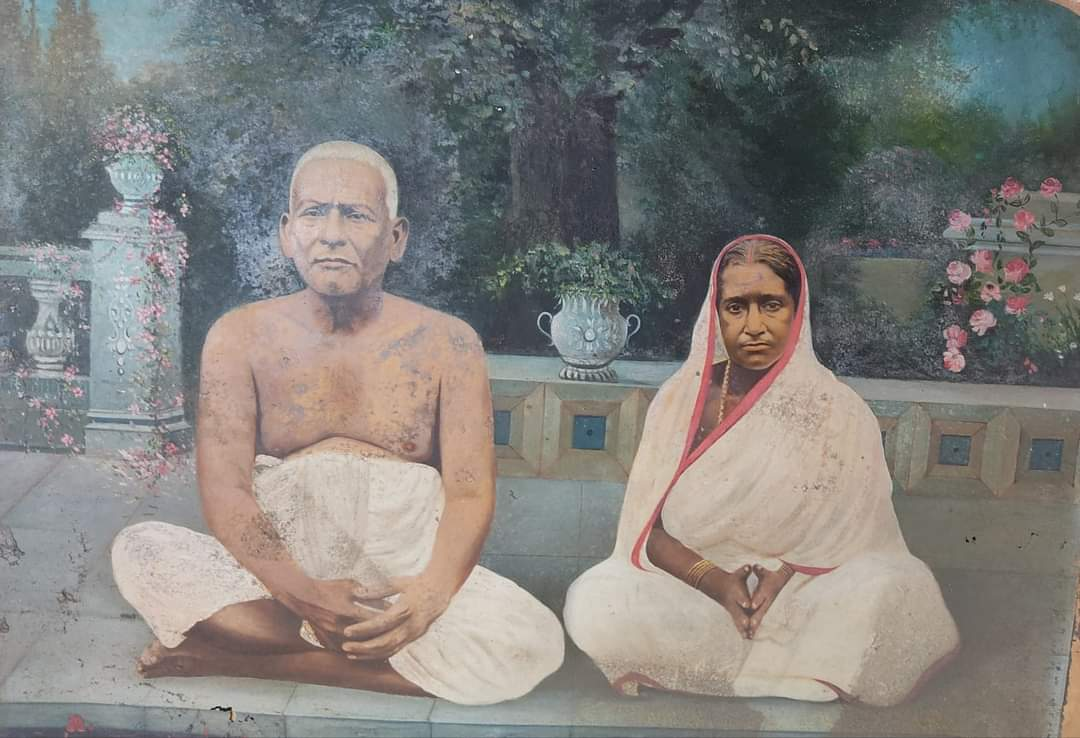
An elderly Gagan Biswas with his wife

Gagan Chandra married Sarbosundari Debi, the daughter of a prominent zamindar of the same caste, Parbati Charan Bakshi of Nadia district. They had five children, three sons and two daughters. The eldest son, Lalit Mohan Biswas, became the chief medical officer of the Calcutta Corporation. Another son, Jatindranath Biswas, was a great freedom fighter and a member of Anushilan Samiti. He also studied engineering and following his father's footsteps, was involved in building many monuments and landmarks contributing towards the growth of the country. He was also the first president of the All India Forward Bloc of Subhas Chandra Bose.

== Death ==
Biswas died on 1935 in Calcutta, in the house of his eldest son Lalit Mohan Biswas, in 26 Baithak Khana road at Sealdah, Calcutta. The Calcutta Municipal Corporation had constructed a plaque in his honour. His funeral was attended by then mayor of Calcutta, Nalini Ranjan Sarkar and many other distinguished citizens.
