= Acquin Martin =

Sir Thomas Acquin Martin (6 March 1850 – 29 April 1906) was an English industrial pioneer in India, and agent-general for Afghanistan.

== Early life ==
Martin was born in Four Oaks, Sutton Coldfield, Birmingham, on 6 March 1850, son of Patrick William Martin, a leather manufacturer, and wife Mary Anne Bridges. He was educated at the Oratory, Edgbaston, and then entered the engineering firm of Walsh, Lovett and Co in Birmingham. He married Sarah Ann Harrby on 2 April 1869 in Birmingham.

== In India ==
In 1874, Martin went to Calcutta (present-day Kolkata) to start a branch for Walsh, Lovett and Co. Soon afterwards he founded the firm Martin & Co in Calcutta. The firm took over in 1889 the Bengal Iron and Steel Company, which inaugurated production on a capitalised basis, permitting competition with imported steel and iron.

The firm pioneered the construction in India of light railways (which it also managed), to serve as feeders of the main lines.

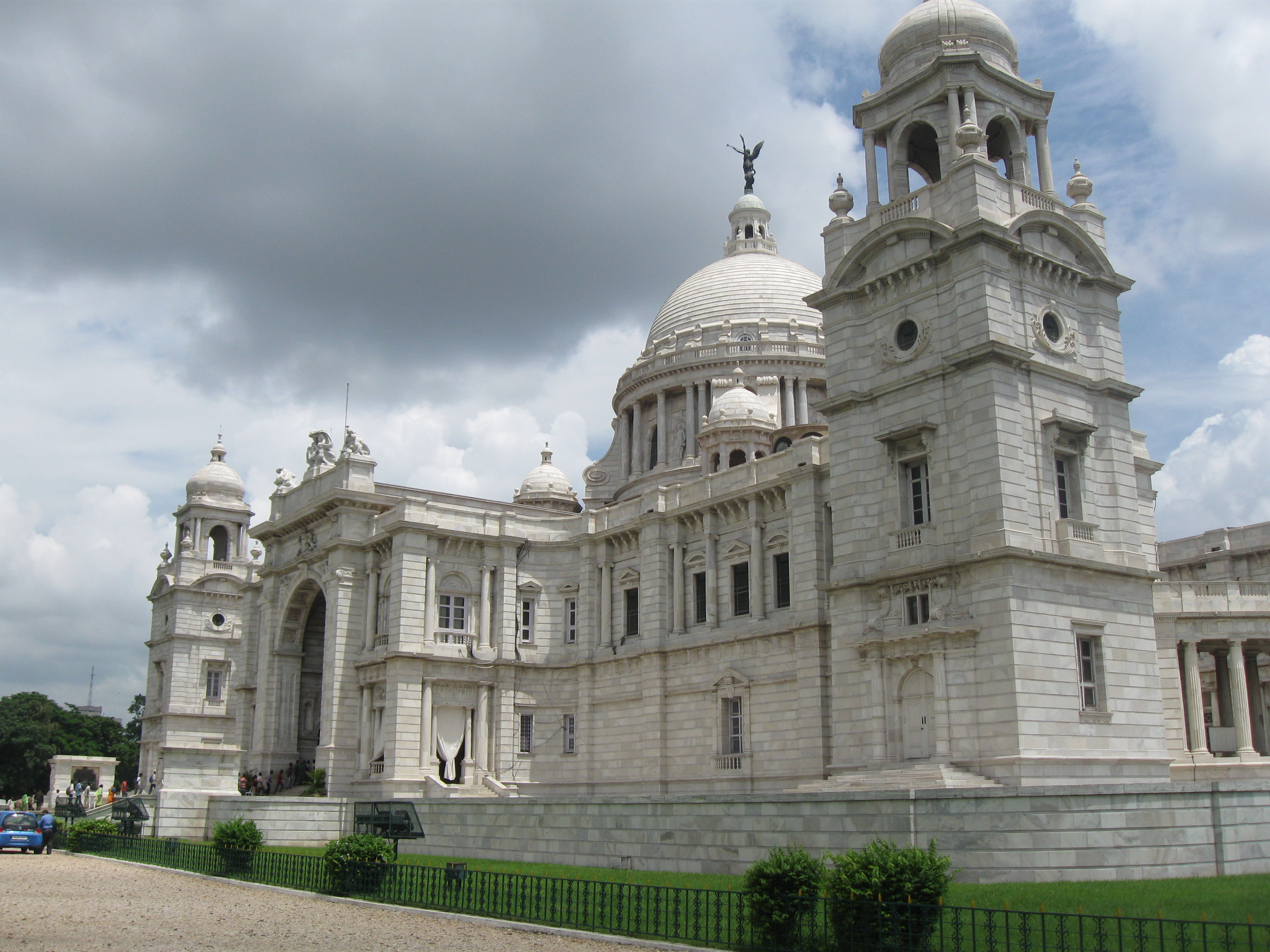
Victoria Memorial, Kolkata

Many jute mills in Bengal were constructed by the firm, and up to Martin's death it had the management of the Arathoon jute mills, Calcutta. Three large collieries in Bengal, and the Hooghly Docking and Engineering Company were under its control.

The Tansa duct works, providing Bombay (present-day Mumbai) with a constant water supply from a lake forty miles distant, were engineered by the firm. The firm also engineered the water supplies of the suburbs of Calcutta, and of a large number of Indian towns, including Allahabad, Benares, Cawnpore, Lucknow, Agra, and Srinagar (Kashmir).

With Edward Thornton FRIBA as principal architect, the firm erected chiefs' palaces and important public buildings in various parts of India, particularly in Calcutta where they were contractors for the Victoria Memorial Hall.

== Afghanistan ==
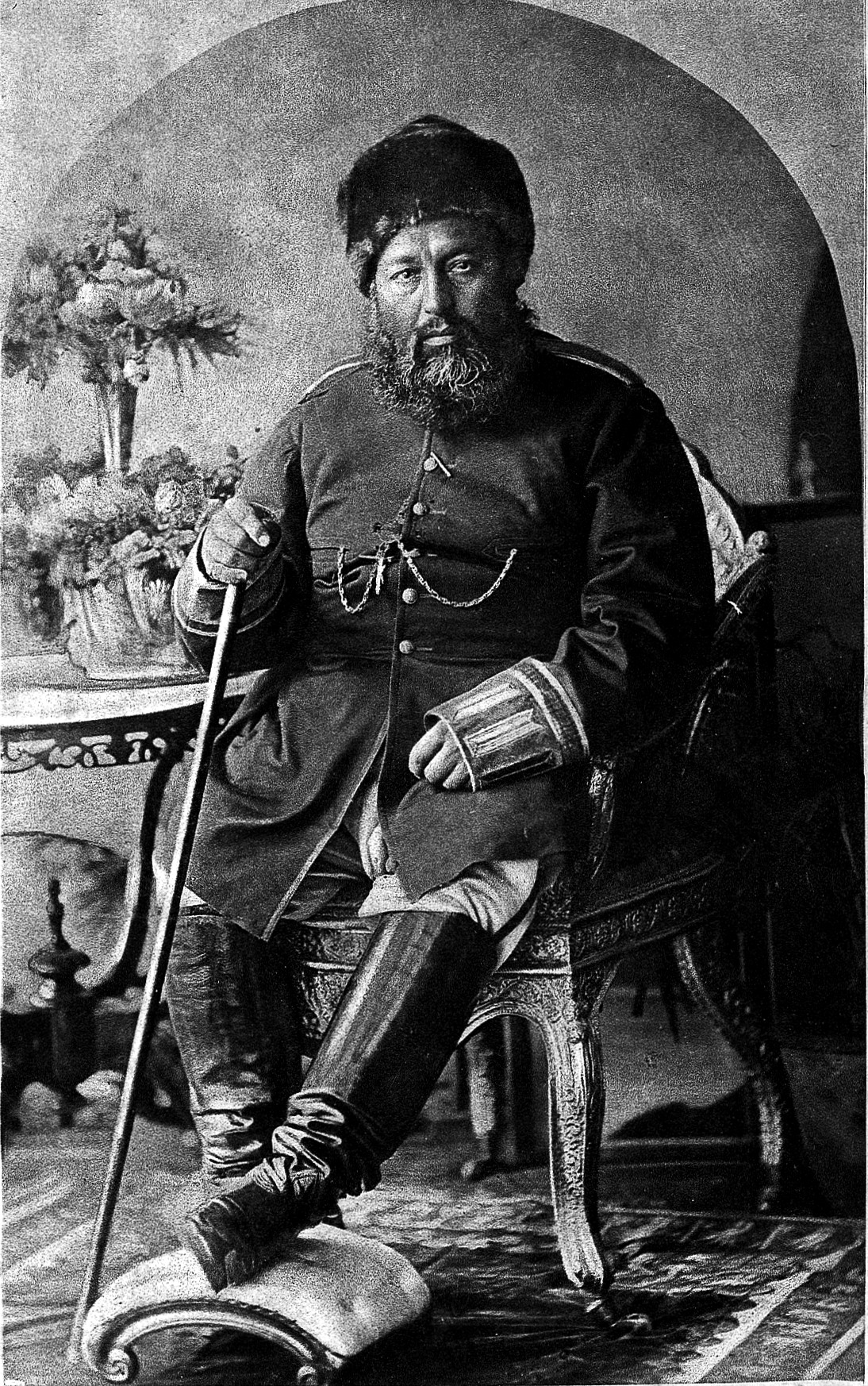
Abdur Rahman Khan

Early in 1887 Martin was appointed agent by Abdur Rahman Khan, Emir of Afghanistan; he sent to Kabul Thomas Salter Pyne. Pyne, on behalf of Martin's firm, built for the Emir an arsenal, a mint, and various factories and workshops, subsequently introducing, as state monopolies, a number of modern industries.

Martin was often consulted by the Emir on questions of policy, and he and his agents were able to render frequent political service to Great Britain. Abdur Rahman selected him to be chief of the staff of Prince Nasrullah Khan, his second son, on his mission to England in 1895. The stay here lasted from 24 May to 3 September, and in August Martin was knighted. Though the Emir's main object in arranging the visit — the opening of direct diplomatic relations with Great Britain — was not achieved, Abdur Rahman still retained full confidence in him. On his return to Kabul, Nasrullah Khan was accompanied by Martin's younger brother Frank, who succeeded Pyne as engineer-in-chief.

== Later years ==
In 1889 Rajendra Nath Mookerjee KCIE, of Bengal, became a partner, and shared with Martin's sons, Ernest and Harold, and Mr. C. W. Walsh the proprietorship of the firm. Martin's health was badly affected by the local climate, and he spent much of his later life in Europe. He died at Binstead House, Isle of Wight, on 29 April 1906, and was buried in Ryde Cemetery.

== Family ==
A son, Brigadier-General Cuthbert Thomas Martin was killed during the First World War.

== Attribution ==
This article incorporates text from a publication now in the public domain: Brown, Frank Herbert (1912). "Martin, Thomas Acquin". In Lee, Sidney (ed.). Dictionary of National Biography (2nd supplement). Vol. 2. London: Smith, Elder & Co. p. 578.
