= Martin Burn =

Indian real estate development firm

Martin Burn Limited
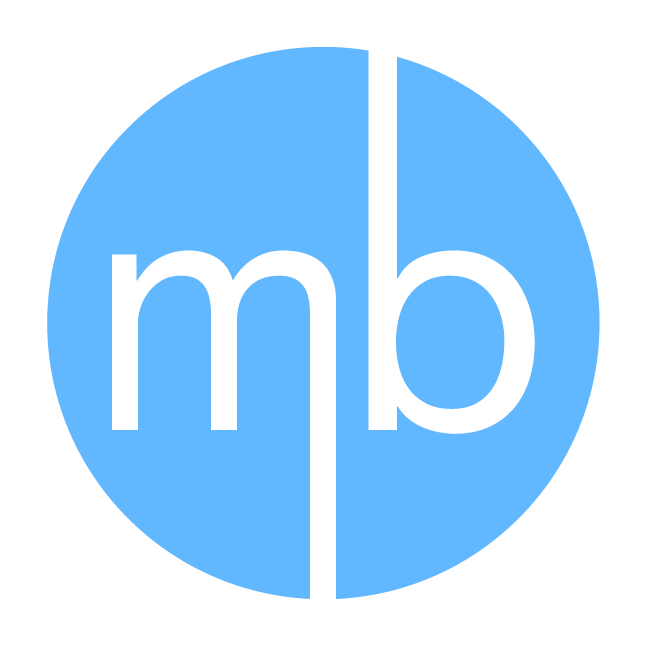
- Type: Public
- Traded as: BSE: 523566
- ISIN: INE199D01016
- Industry: Construction; Real estate
- Founded: 1946; 80 years ago
- Founders: Rajendranath Mukherjee; Thomas Acquin Martin
- Headquarters: Kolkata, West Bengal, India
- Website: Martin Burn Website

Martin Burn Limited is a real estate development firm based in Kolkata.

== History ==
The history of Martin Burn Limited, generally referred to as Martin & Burn Co. goes back to 1890, when Sir Rajendranath Mukherjee in partnership with Sir Thomas Acquin Martin started the firm named Martin Co. Babu Gagan Chandra Biswas was appointed as the Chief Engineer of the company in its nascent stage, he oversaw many early projects of the company and undertook many Engineering ventures on its behalf for the company's growth.

Martin & Co, has to its credit, building waterworks at Tripura, Palta, Ahmedabad, Lucknow and Benares but, its major contributions are architectural marvels like Esplanade Mansion, Standard Chartered Building, South Eastern Railway Headquarters in Garden Reach, Tipu Sultan Mosque, Patna Secretariat and Ujjayanta Palace. Towards the high point of its business in 1904, the firm was awarded the contract of building the Victoria Memorial, which was completed in 1921. Many of these buildings have been declared Heritage monuments.

Another construction firm, Burn & Co which was founded as Burn & Currie by Alexander Burn in 1809 and had the experience of building many important structures in Calcutta like St. Andrew's Church (1818), the 152 high Ochterlony Monument (1828) was taken over by Rajendranath Mukherjee in 1927 and the two together went on dotting the city with buildings like St. Xaviers' College (1934–40), Oriental Seminary, Belur Math (1932), the headquarters of the Ramakrishna Mission, Darbhanga House, Assembly House, Grand Hotel Arcade, United Bank Buildings, New Secretariat Building, and Club House at Eden Gardens. The city of Kolkata – is sometimes also referred to as Martin Burn City for this reason.

The two civil engineering companies were merged to form present day Martin Burn Limited in 1946.

== Present status ==
Martin Burn Limited is now operated by Fatehpuria's and the Mukherjees no longer hold any stake in the business. The company still operates from its original head office at R. N. Mookerjee Road, Martin Burn House in B.B.D. Bagh area of Kolkata. The old Martin Burn House which was in the Victorian style, has been replaced with a more modern multi-storied building housing many corporates.

The BSE listed company engages in civil engineering, construction activities and turnkey projects.

== See also ==
- Burnpur
