= Thomas Salter Pyne =

British engineer

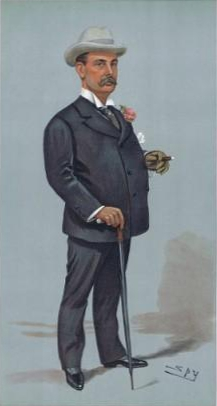
Caricature of Pyne by Spy for Vanity Fair, 1900

Sir Thomas Salter Pyne CSI (1860–1921) was a British engineer based in Afghanistan.

== Biography ==
He was born in Broseley, Shropshire, to John Pyne and Alice Salter. At the age of 15, he began an apprenticeship with an engineer and by 1879, had become the manager of a foundry and engineering works.

In 1883, Pyne moved to India, where he worked for the merchant Thomas Acquin Martin for a few years. In 1887, after Martin was appointed Agent by Abdur Rahman Khan, the Amir of Afghanistan, Pyne was sent to Kabul to serve as Chief Engineer of Afghanistan. He became the first European to live in Afghanistan since the Second Anglo-Afghan War (1879–1881). In this capacity, he trained local Afghans in the production of guns, swords, ammunition, coins, soap, and candles. On behalf of Martin's firm, Pyne oversaw the construction of an arsenal, a mint, and various factories and workshops, employing approximately 4,000 workers.

In 1893, Pyne was sent by the Amir as a Special Ambassador to India. Upon concluding the negotiations, he was appointed a Companion of the Order of the Star of India (CSI) and knighted by the British government in recognition of his services. Pyne was also a key liaison with the Durand Mission, which was tasked with defining the borders of Afghanistan.

Pyne left the Amir's service in 1899 due to ill health and was succeeded by Thomas Martin's younger brother, Frank. As a token of gratitude, the Amir presented Pyne with a diamond-inlaid watch.

He died in 1921. Reflecting on Pyne's contributions, Sir Mortimer Durand remarked, "Pyne has gained a remarkable position in Afghanistan... The more I have to do with him, the more respect I feel for his sagacity."
