= Giribala Thakurbari, Agarpara =

Giribala Thakurbari
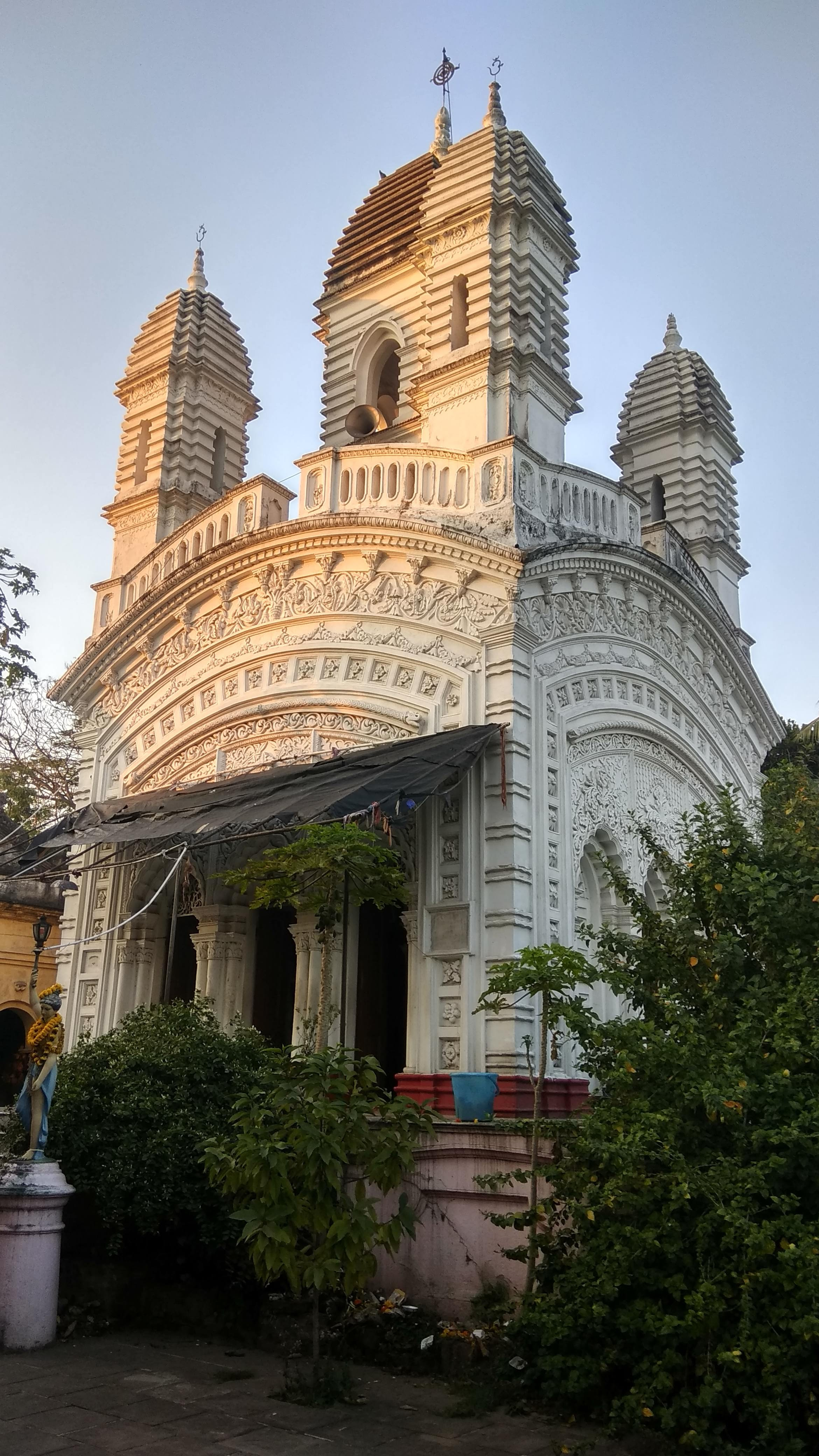
- Giribala Thakurbari, Agarpara

Religion
- Affiliation: Hinduism
- District: North 24 Parganas district
- Deity: Radha Gobinda Jiu

Location
- Location: Agarpara
- State: West Bengal
- Country: India

Architecture
- Type: Bengal architecture
- Style: Pancha-ratna
- Founder: Janbazar Raj
- Completed: 1911; 115 years ago
- Temples: 12 main temple of Radha Gobinda, other smaller temples and a bathing ghat

Giribala Thakurbari is a notable Hindu Pancha-ratna style historic temple complex located at Agarpara, near Panihati in North 24 Parganas, West Bengal, on the banks of the Hooghly River.

== History ==
The complex was established in the year 1911 (18th Jaistha, 1318 Bangabda) by Giribala Debi, the wife of Babu Gopal Krishna Das, of the Janbazar Raj family, the temple stands today as an important example of early-twentieth-century Bengali religious architecture and Vaishnavite heritage.

== Features ==
The shrine is dedicated to Sri Radha-Govinda, reflecting the strong devotional tradition of Vaishnavism prevalent in Bengal. Architecturally, Giribala Thakurbari is built in the classic Pancharatna style, distinguished by five spires rising above the main sanctum, a central large tower surrounded by four smaller corner pinnacles. In front of the temple is a spacious natmandir used for congregational worship and devotional singing. The entrance to the complex is marked by a raised platform flanked by six small Shiva temples, three on each side, symbolizing the harmonious coexistence of Shaiva and Vaishnava traditions in Bengali religious culture. The temple premises also include a ceremonial ghat on the Hooghly River, which has contributed to its popular description as a “Choto Dakshineswar” or “Small Dakshineswar,” because of its architectural layout and riverside setting resembling the famous Dakshineswar Kali Temple.

== Construction ==
The cost of the construction of the temple, was more than 3 lakh rupees, a huge amount in those days. The responsibility of designing and construction of the temples was delegated to the engineering firm of Gagan Chandra Biswas.

== Gallery ==
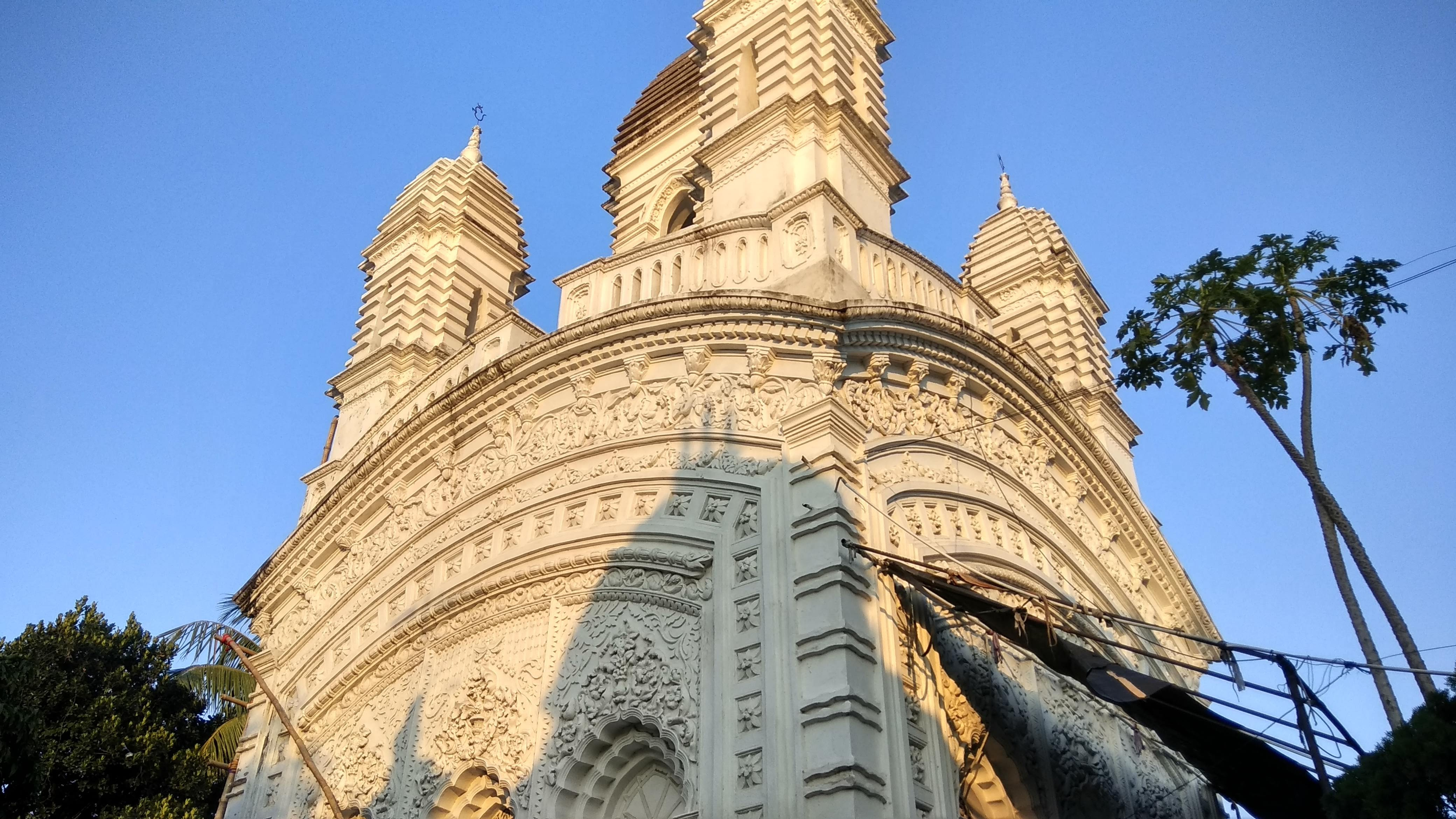
The main temple of Radha Gobinda Jiu

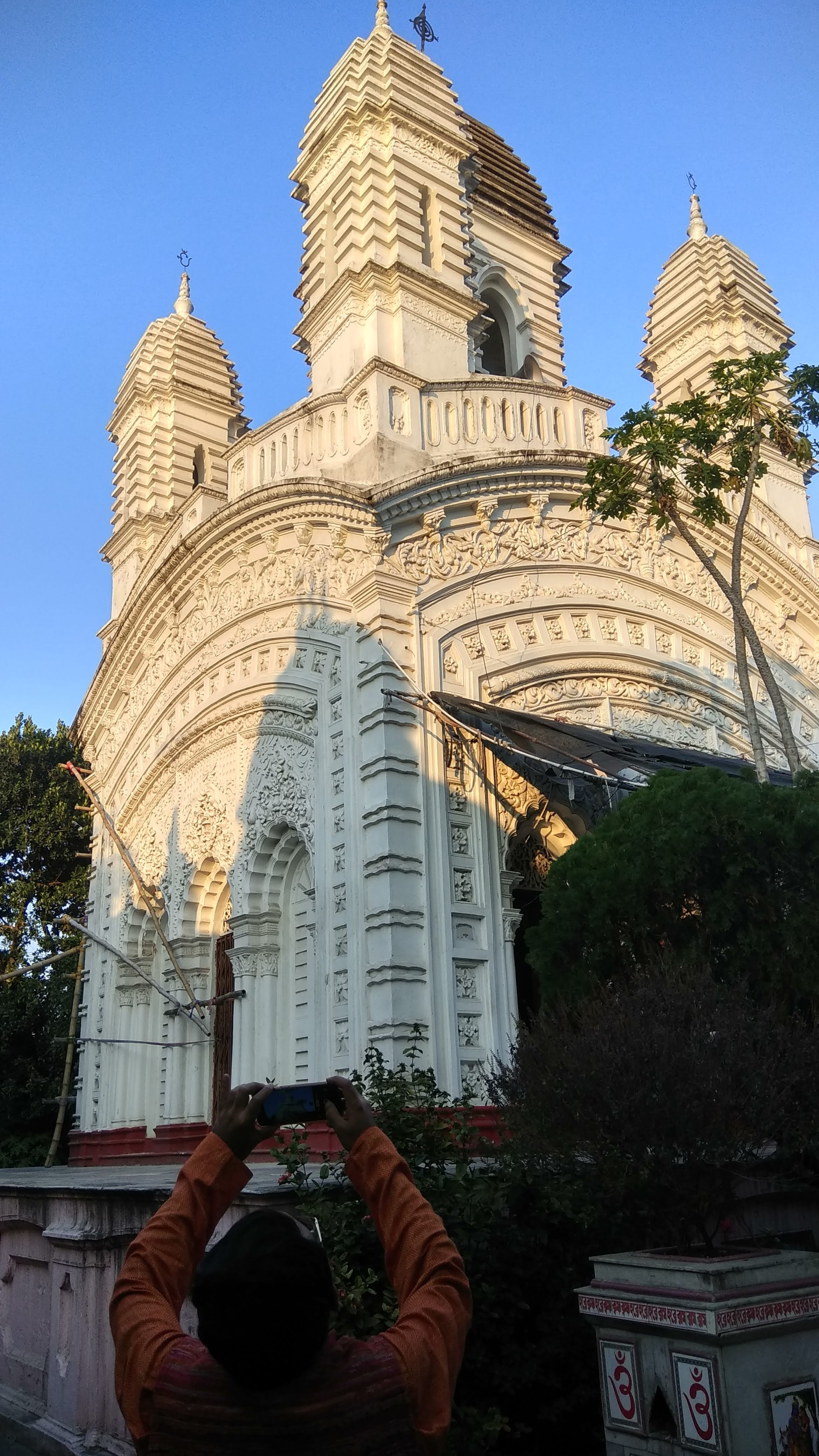
The temple stands in the centre of the complex, similar to Dakshineshwar Kali Temple

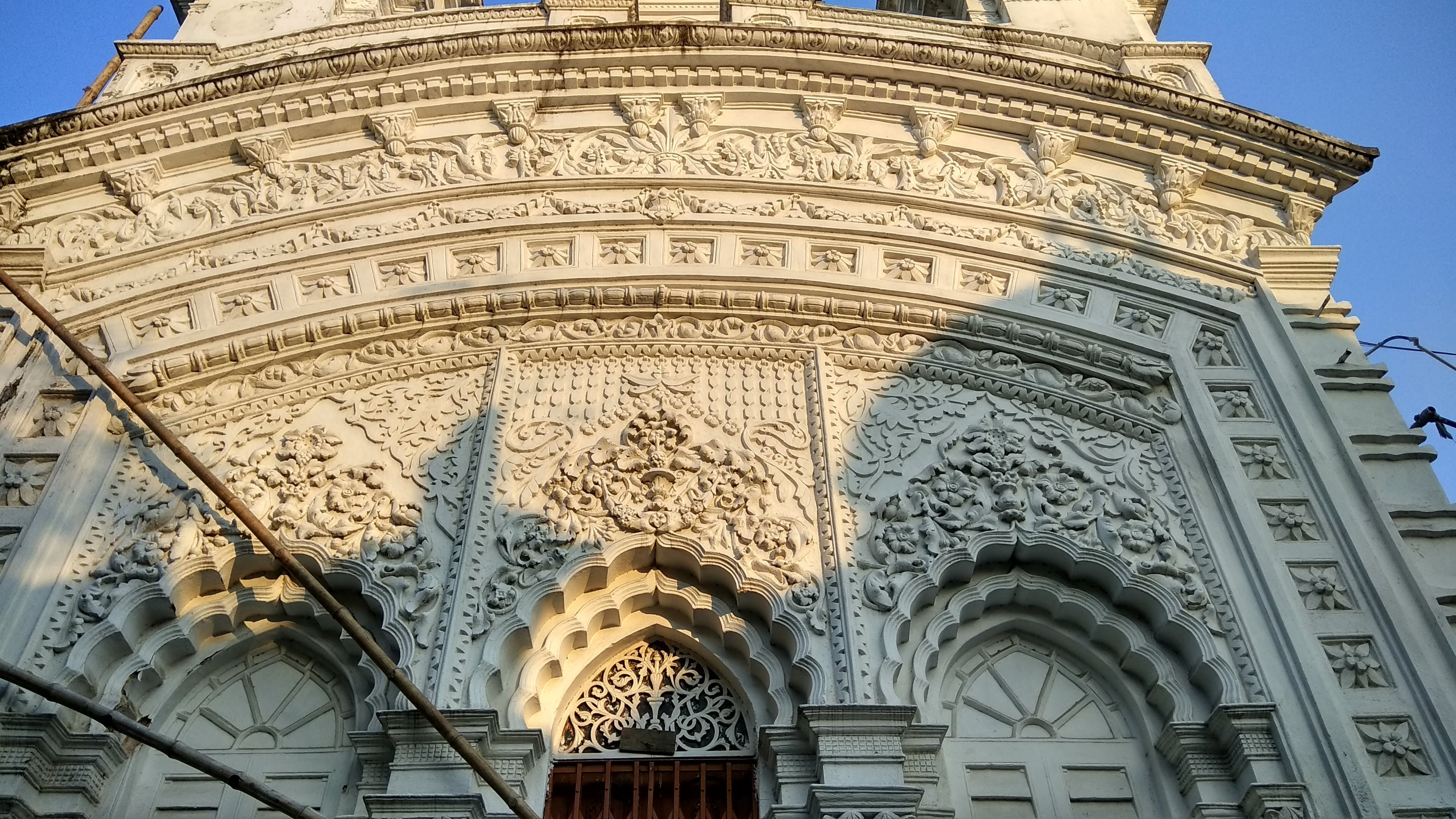
Outside look

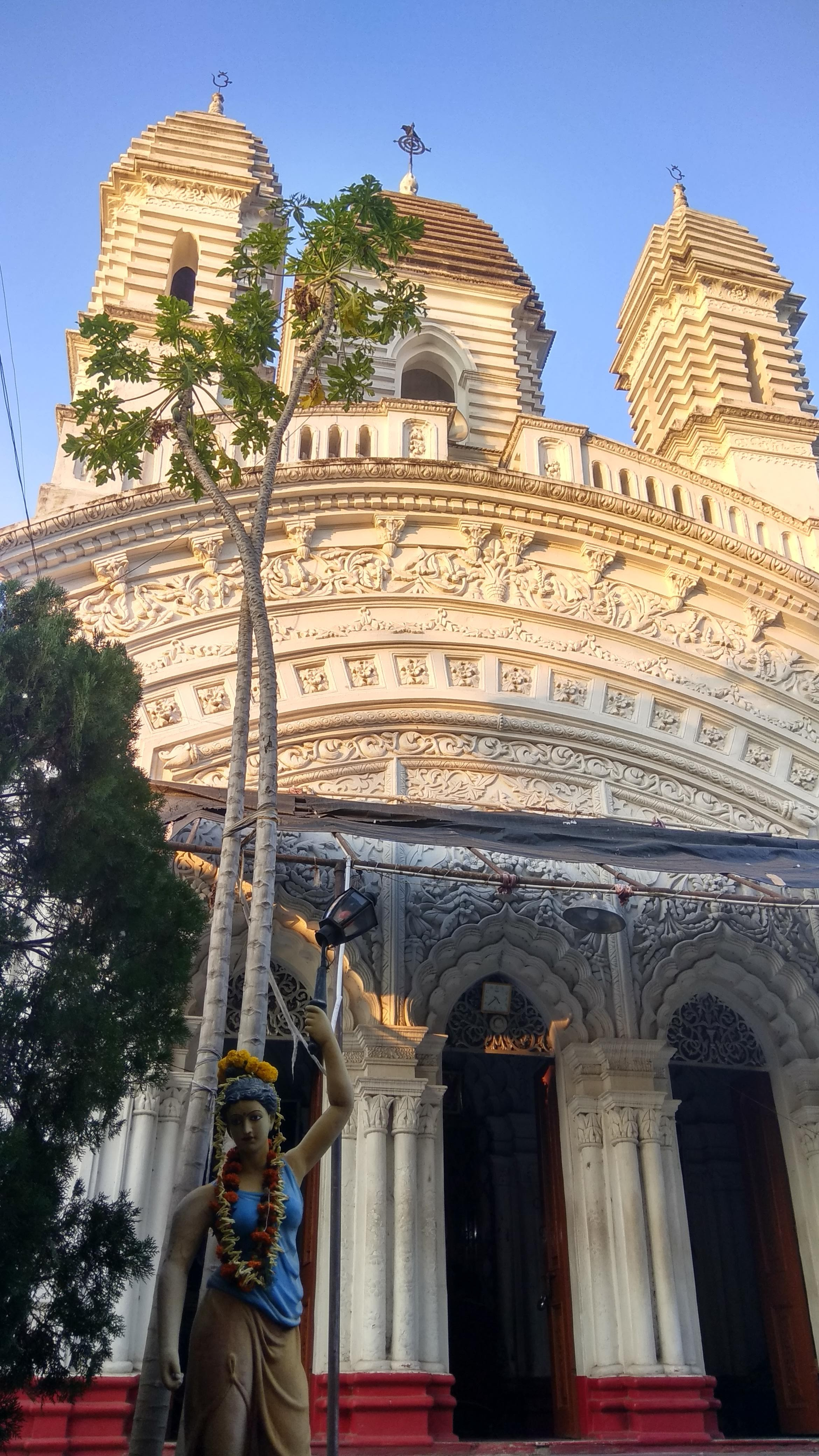
Pancha Ratna style

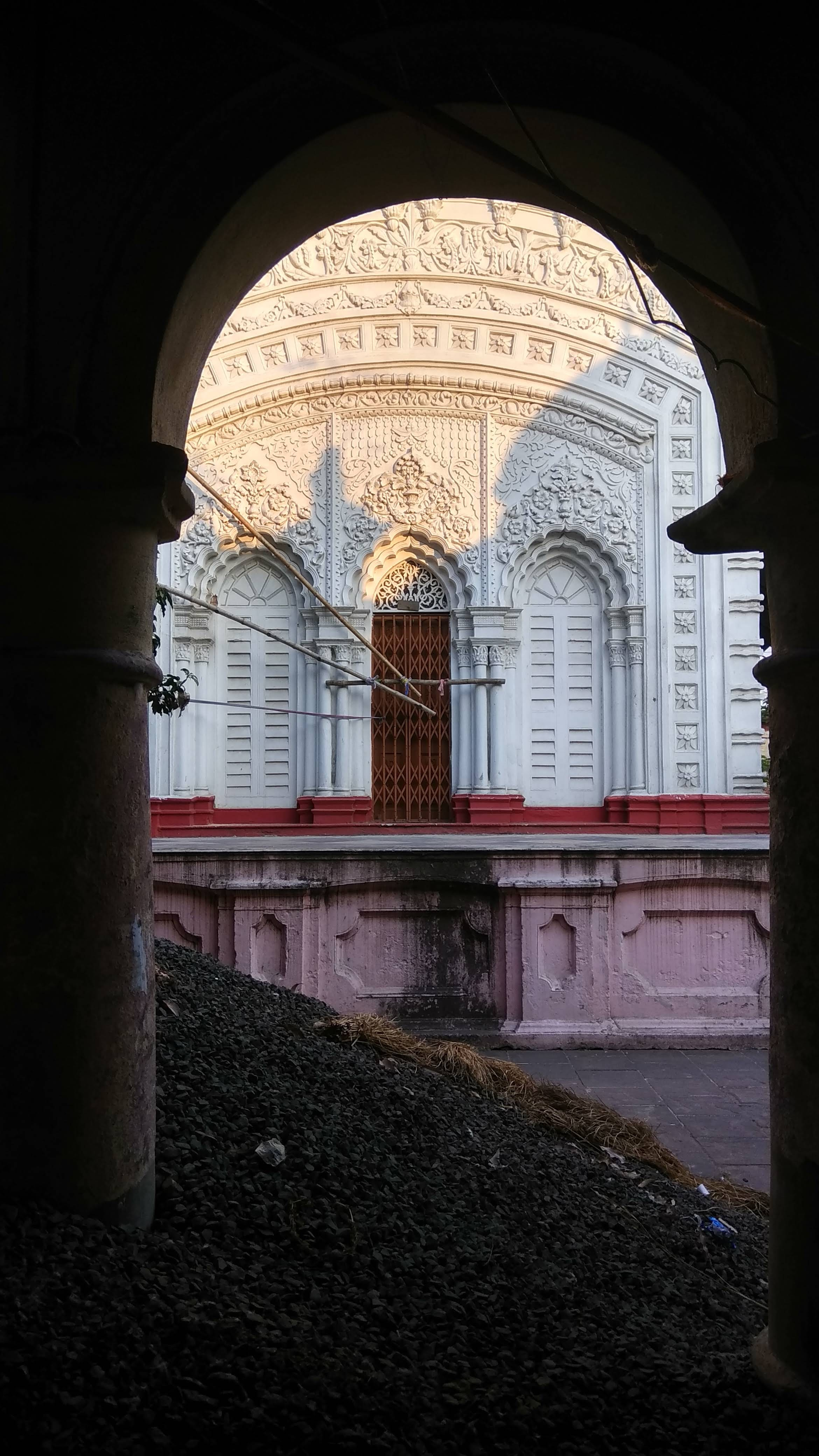
Seen from the Nat Mandir

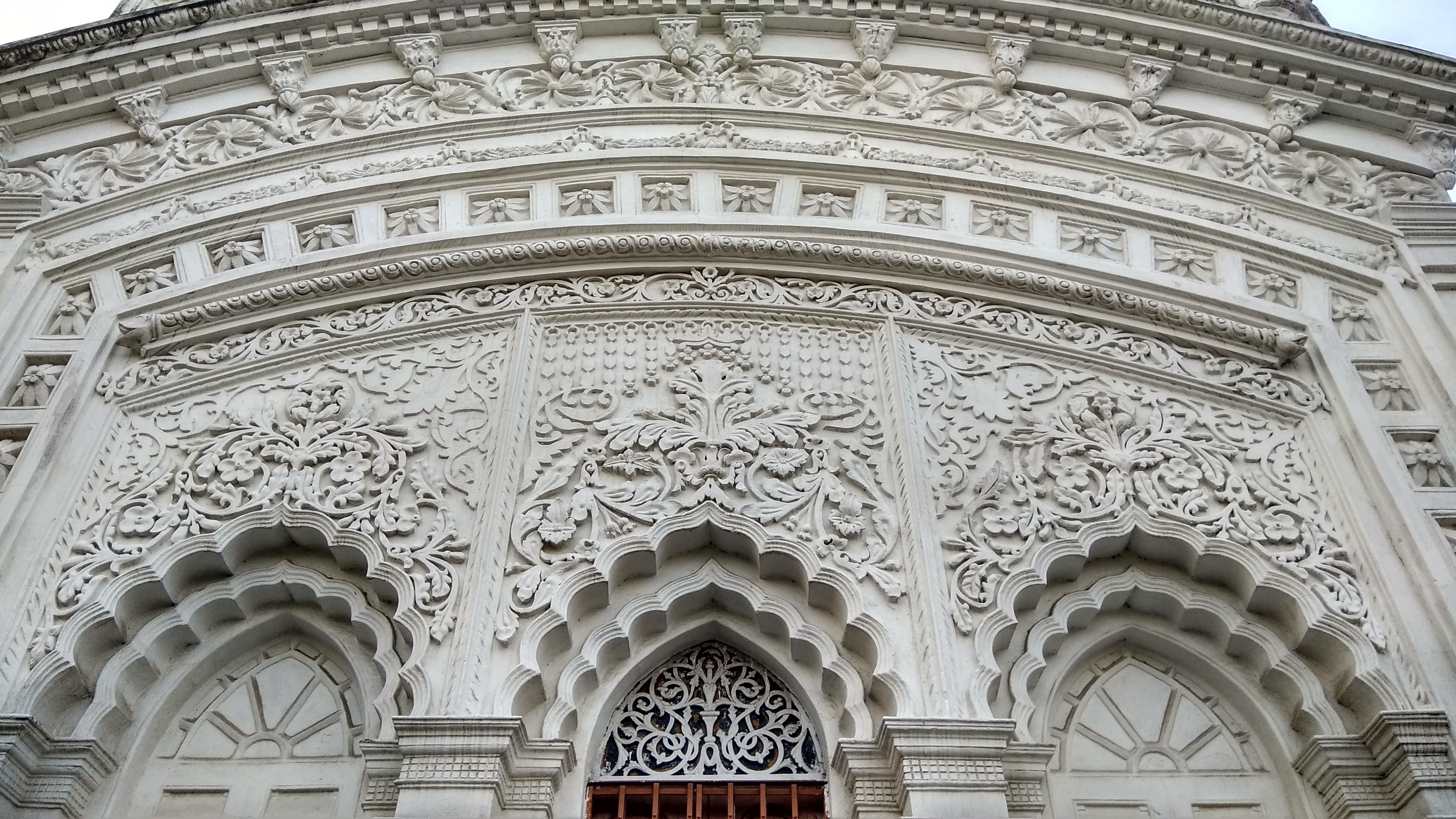
Terracotta works

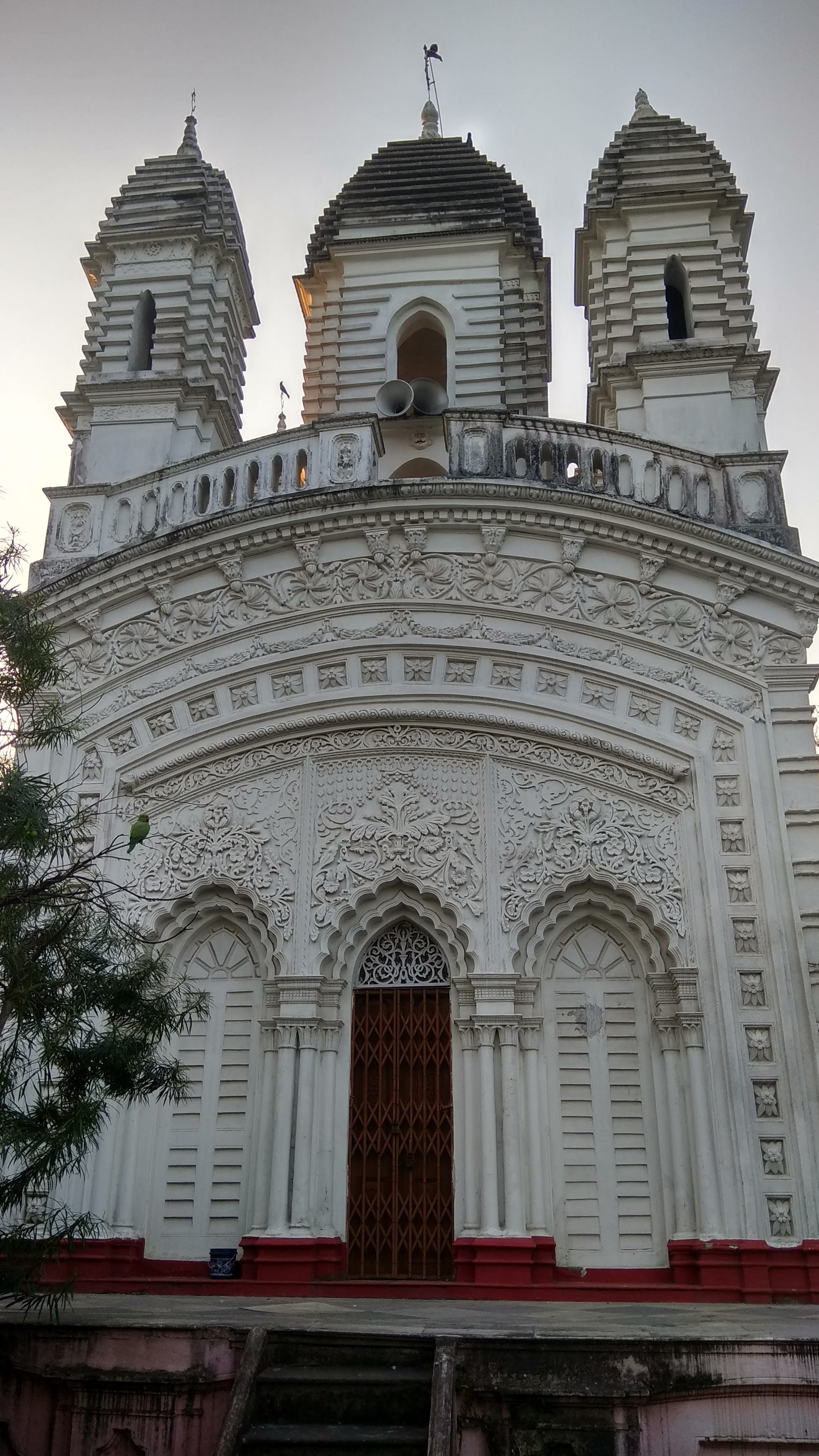

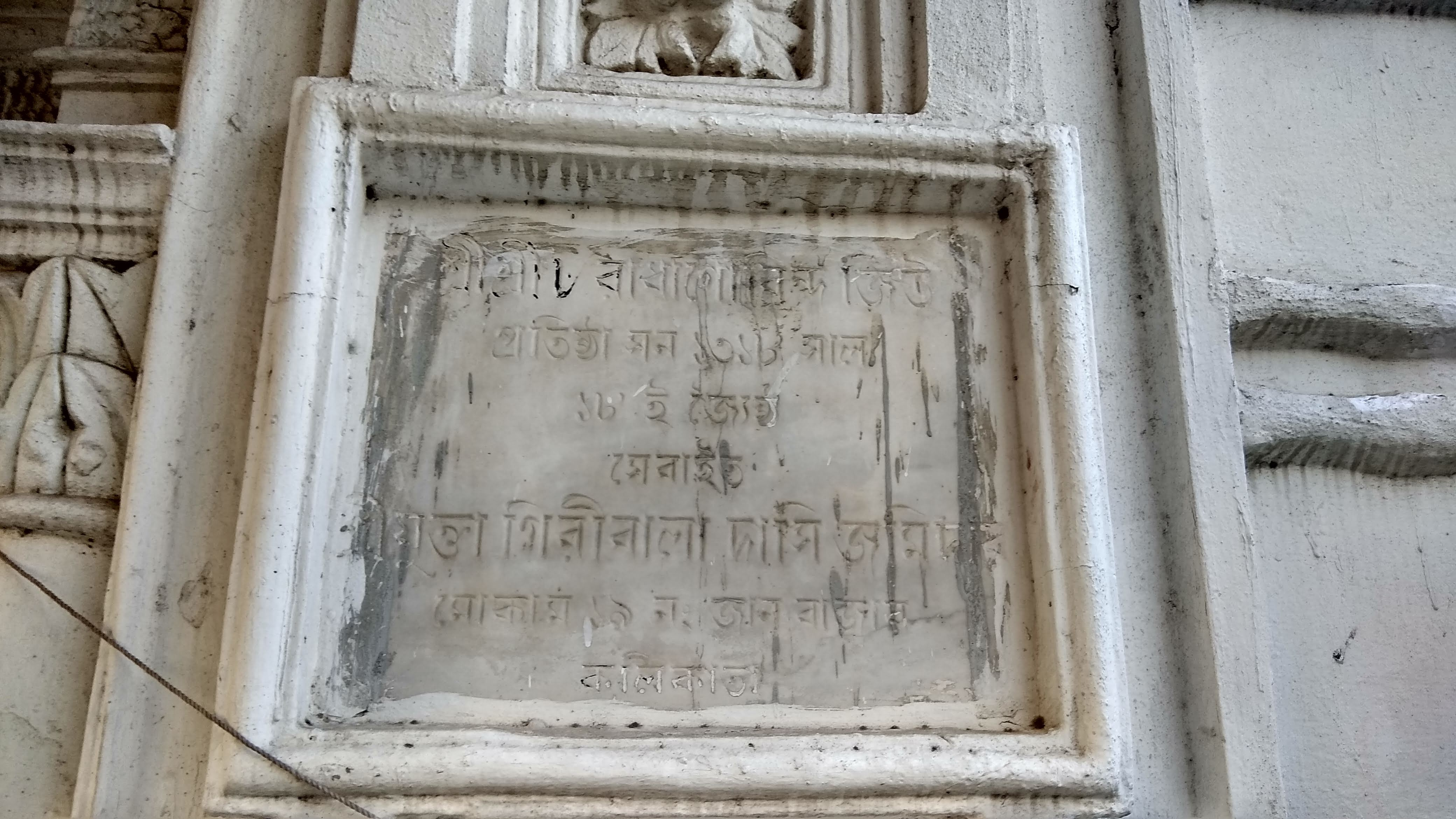
The Plaque

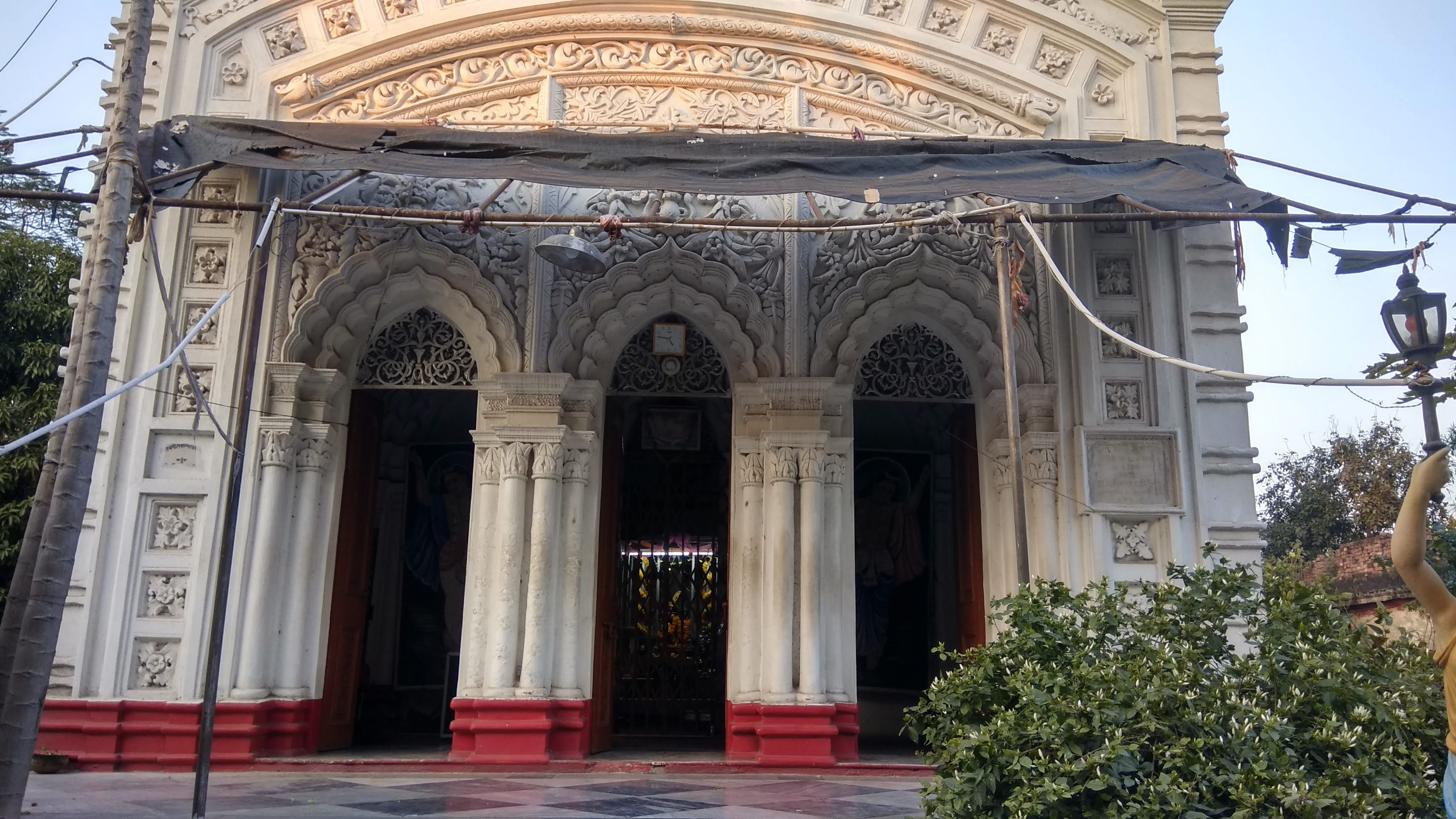
Pillar of the Temple

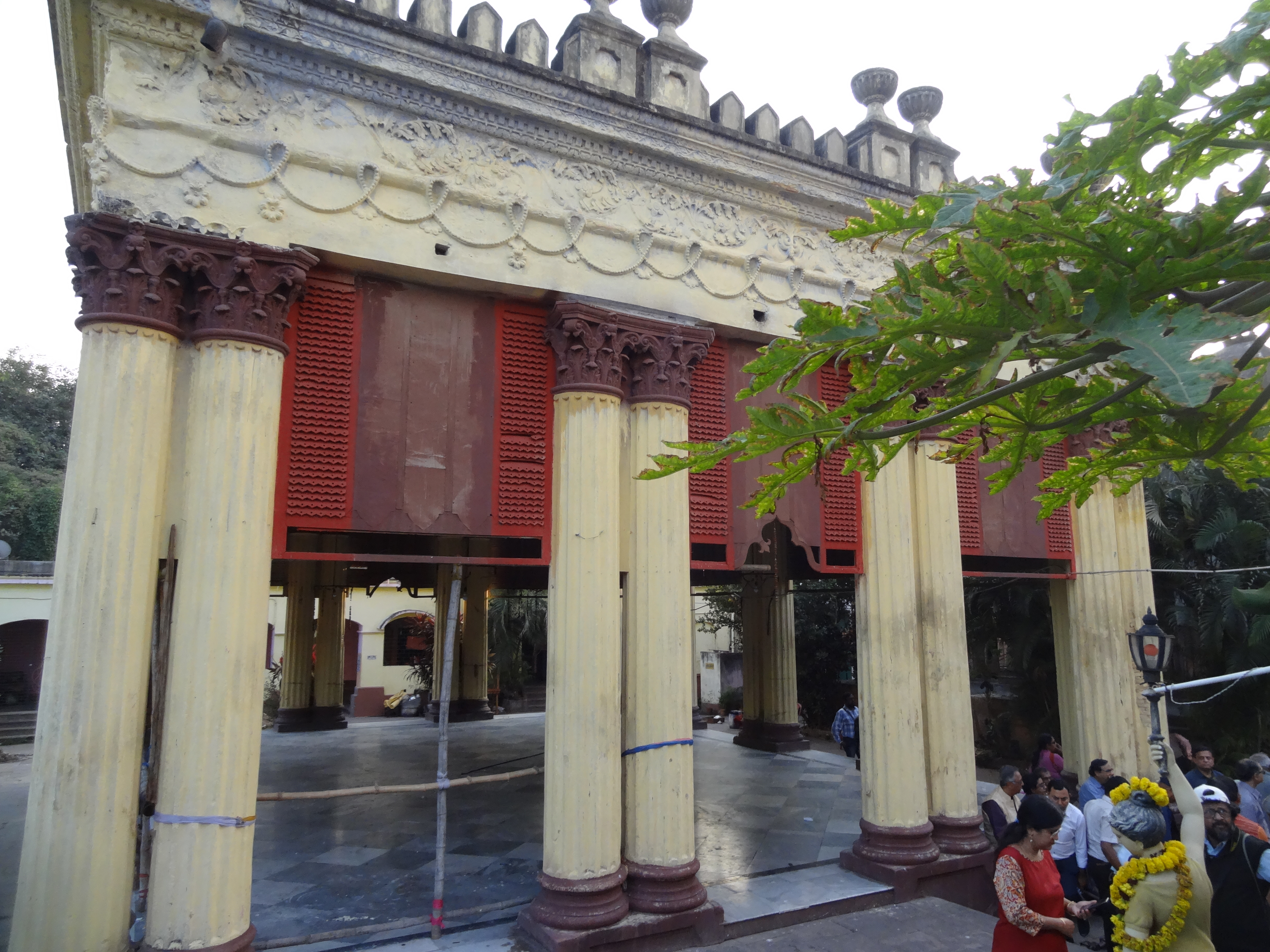
The Ghat

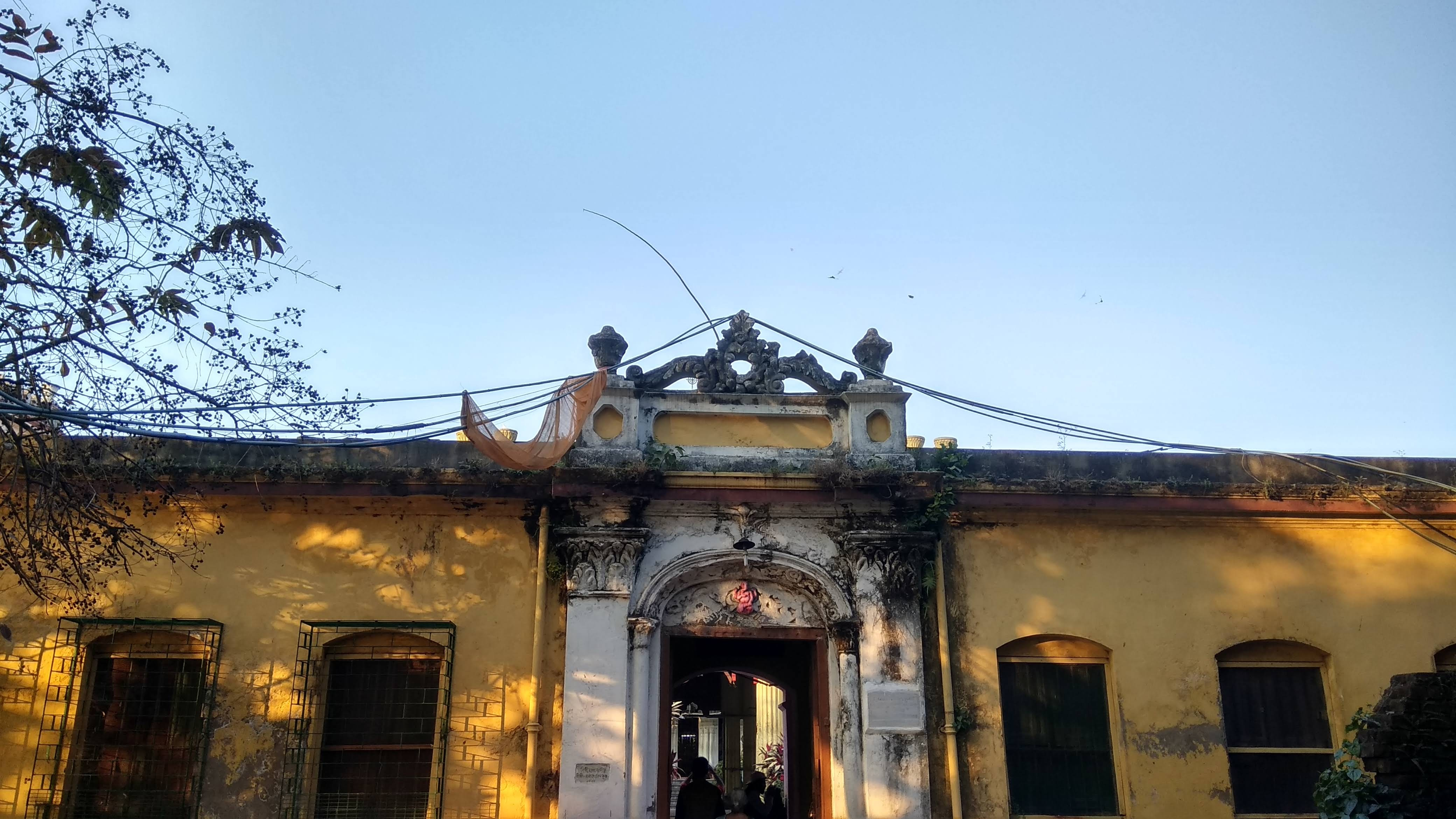
Images of the Ghat

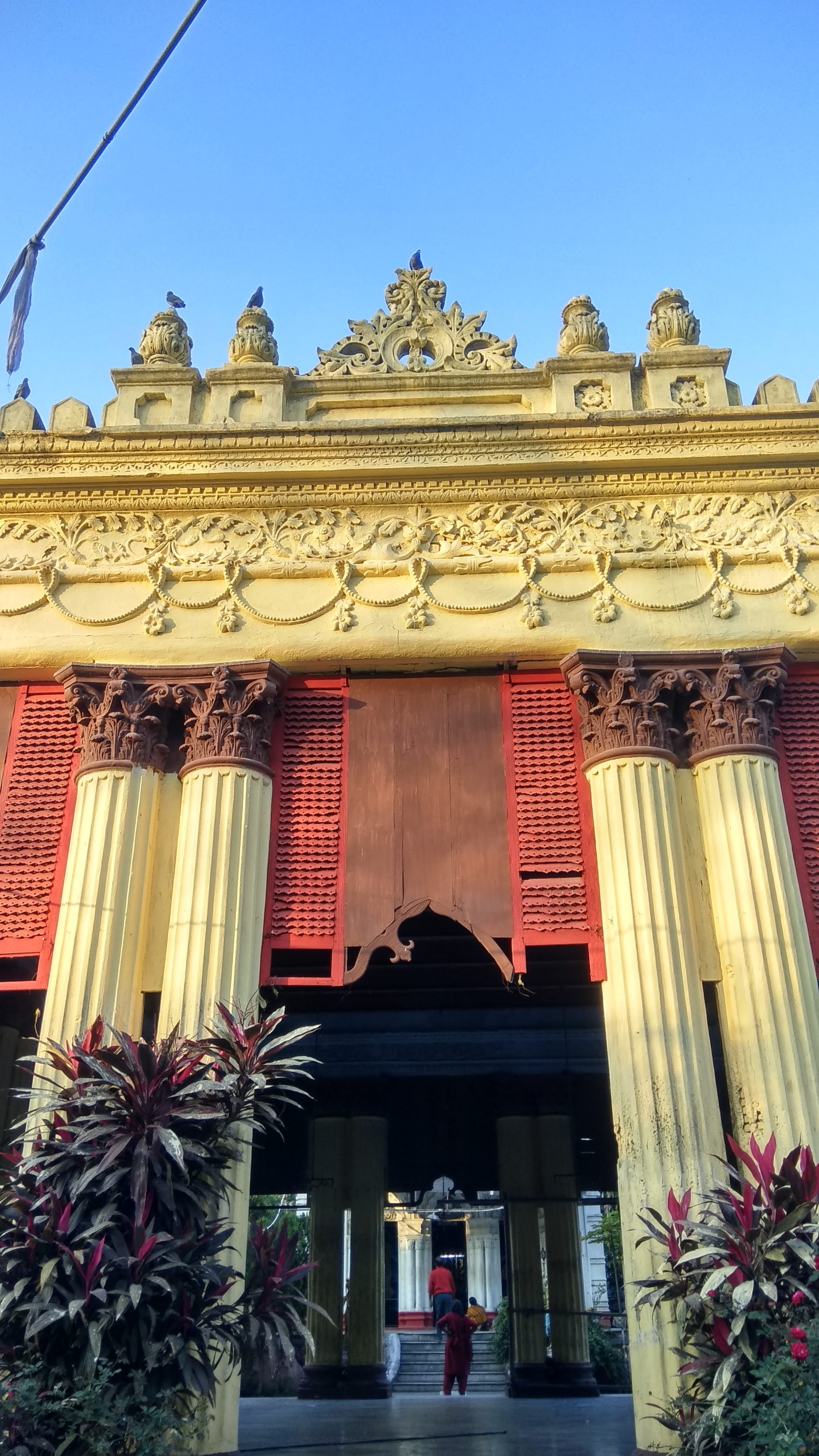
Corinthian Pillars

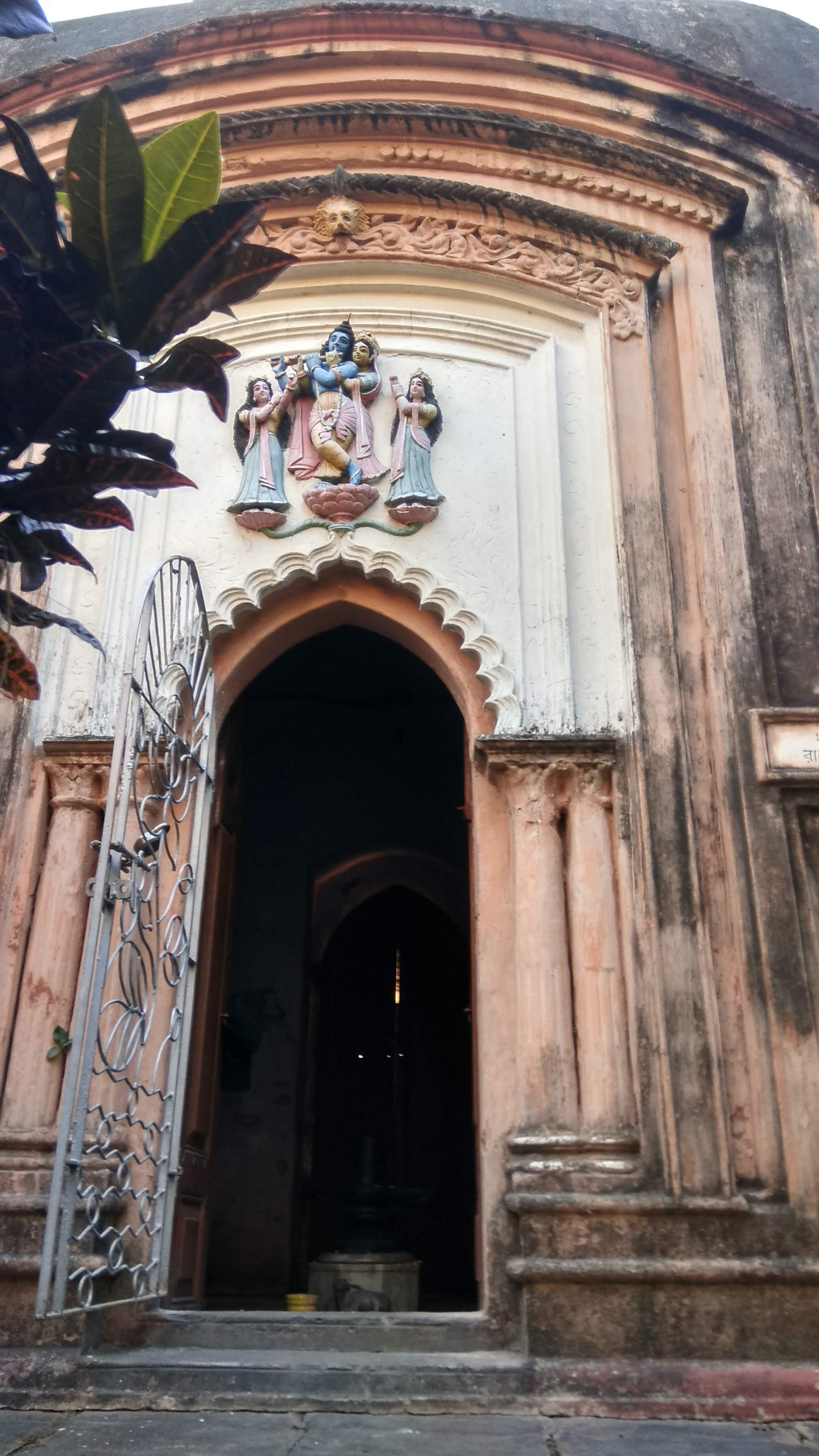
Shiva Temple

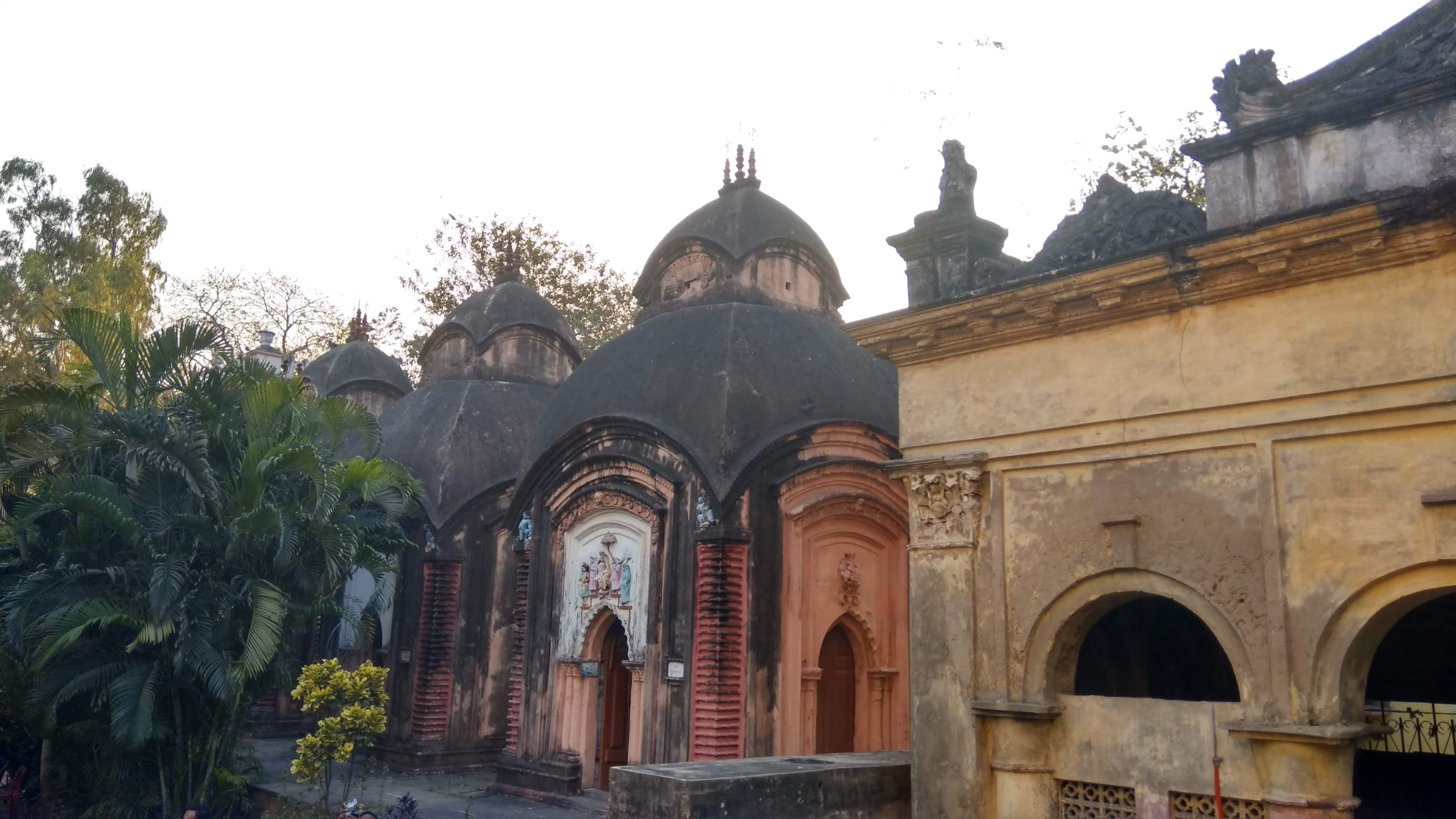
Shiva Temples

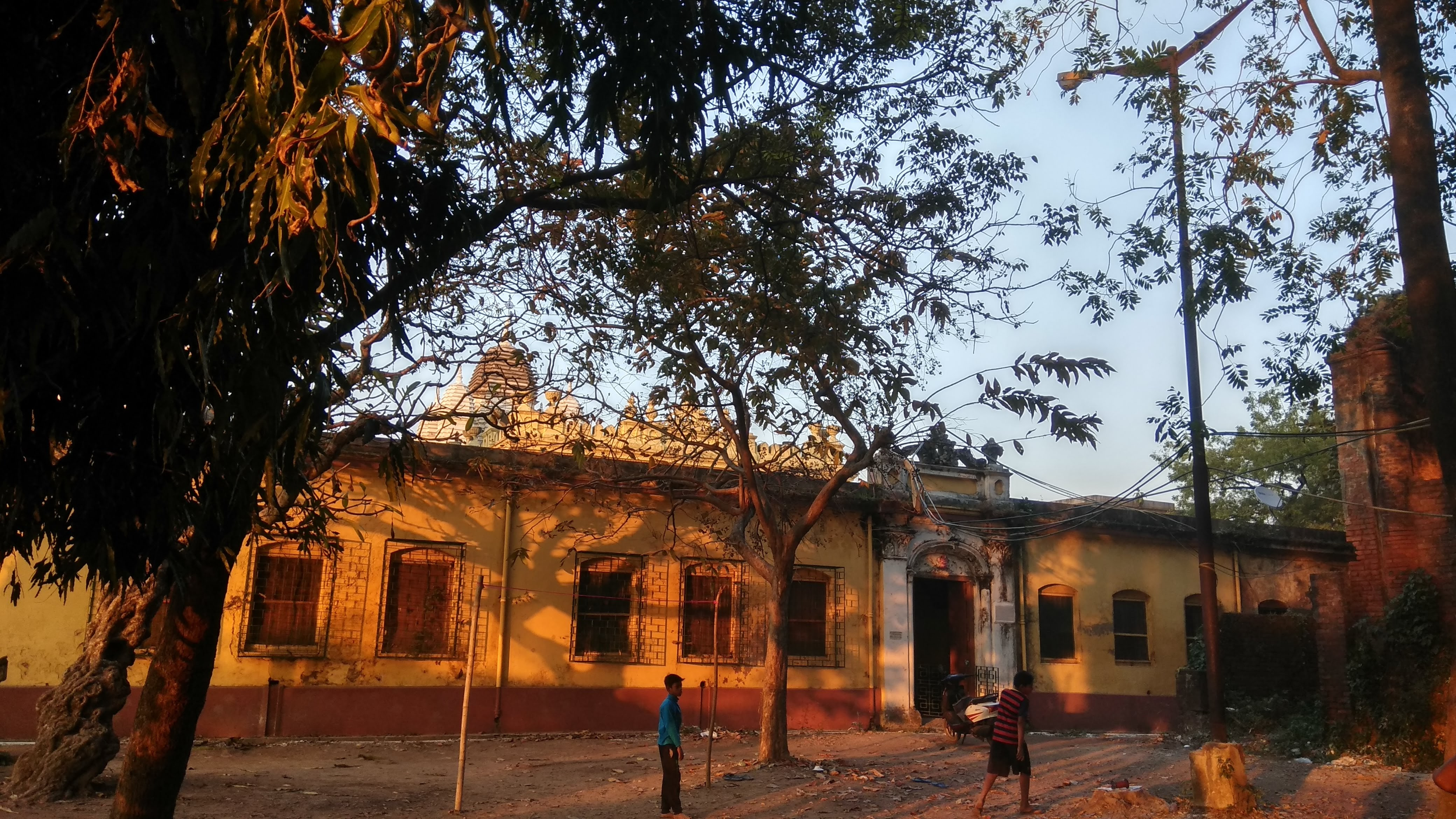
The Premises

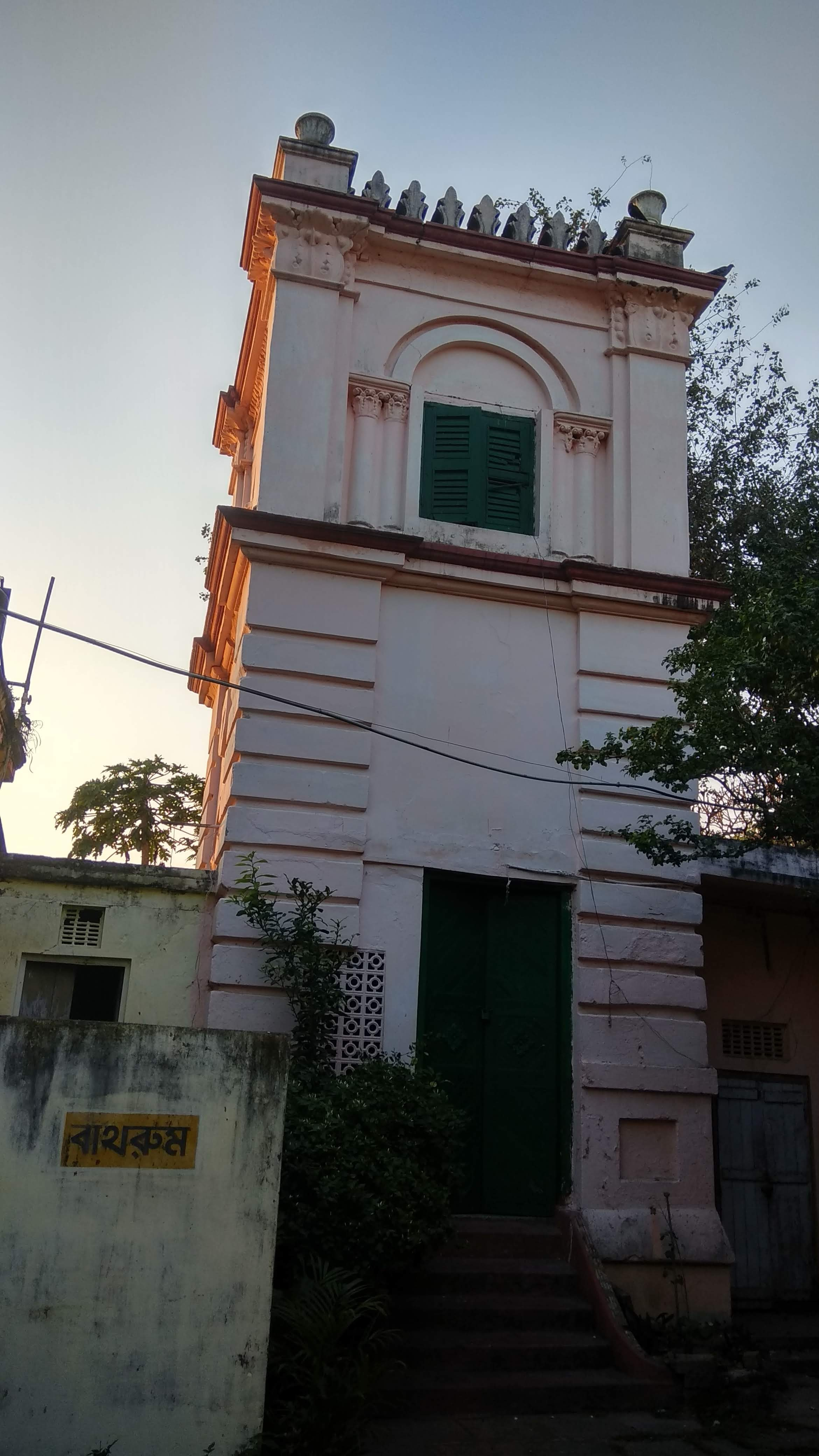
The Entrance

== See also ==
- Janbazar Raj
- Dakshineswar Kali temple
- Annapurna Temple, Titagarh
