= My Master =

My Master may refer to:

- My Master (book), a book written by Swami Vivekananda and published in 1901
- Rabbi, a teacher of Torah
- Sidi, a masculine title of respect in Western Arabic language and Egyptian Arabic
