= Bhairavi Brahmani =

Bengali Hindu guru

Bhairavi Brahmani (fl. 1861–1873) was a Bengali Hindu ascetic, guru and Yogeshwari. She instructed the Hindu mystic Ramakrishna and initiated him into Vaishnava Tantra.

== Life ==
Brahmani was born into a Brahmin family in the Jessore district of Bengal, now in Bangladesh. Her date of birth is unknown. Brahmani became an itinerant ascetic and guru. She carried with her the Raghuvir Shila (a stone idol representing lord Rama and all Vaishnava deities) and was well versed in the texts of the Gaudiya Vaishnavism religious movement and Tantrika literature.

In 1861, Brahmani arrived at the Hindu mystic Ramakrishna's temple by boat, when he was plucking flowers in the garden. She wore ochre robes and was about forty years old. As soon as she met him, she burst into tears of joy. She declared that she had come after being divinely ordained to teach him. They developed a mother-son relationship and he surrendered his ego to her. She became his first formal guru and initiated him into Vaishnava Tantra. Under her guidance, Ramakrishna went through sixty-four major tantric sadhanas one by one, which were completed in 1863. For all the sixty-four sadhana, he took only three days each to complete.

She taught Ramakrishna the kumari-puja, a form of ritual in which the Virgin Goddess is worshipped symbolically in the form of a young girl. When others thought he was experiencing madness, she told him he was experiencing a phenomenon that accompanies mahabhāva, the supreme attitude of loving devotion towards the divine and an extraordinary state of religious ecstasy. She felt he was so accomplished that she had him declared an avatāra (an incarnation of a god on Earth).

Brahmani lived at Ariadaha, near to the Dakshineswar Kali Temple. She stayed with Ramakrishna the longest of all his teachers, for about twelve years. Her movements after leaving Ramakrishna and her date and place of death are unknown.

== Representation in popular culture ==
- In 2021, Aditi Chatterjee portrayed Brahmani in the TV series Karunamoyee Rani Rashmoni.
