= Annapurna Temple, Titagarh =

Hindu Temple in West Bengal

Annapurna Temple
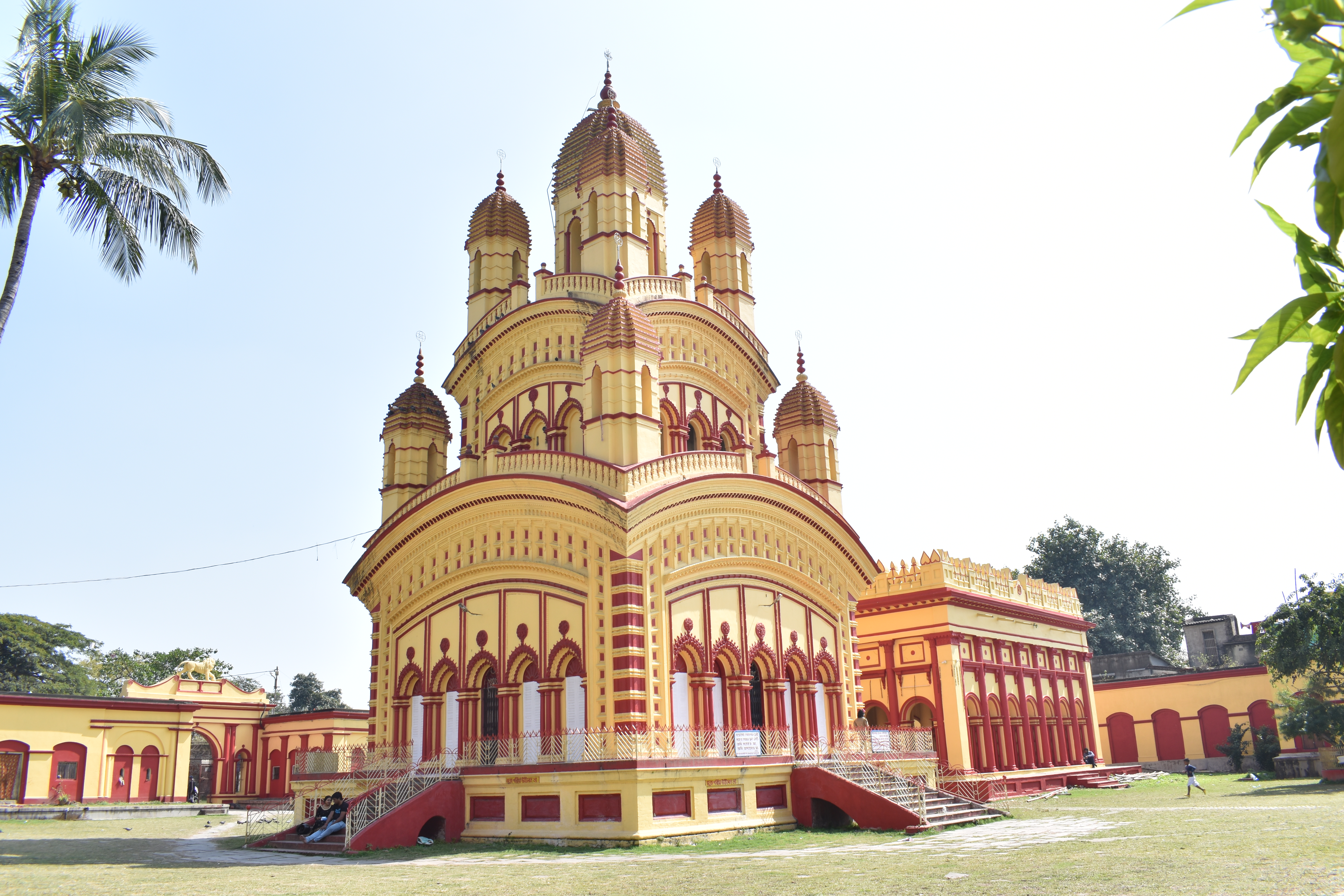
- The Annapurna Temple

- Location in West Bengal

Religion
- Affiliation: Hinduism
- District: North 24 Parganas
- Deity: Shiva, Annapurna

Location
- Location: Titagarh
- State: West Bengal
- Country: India
- Coordinates: 22°44′57″N 88°21′58″E

Annapurna Temple, is a Hindu temple navaratna (nine-pinnacled) heritage situated on the bank of the Ganges at Rasmani ghat at Titagarh, Barrackpore in North 24 Paragana. The temple is similar to the Bhavatarini temple at Dakshineswar. Inside the main temple sanctum, you can see Lord Shiva and Maa Annapurna idols. The idol of Lord Shiva is made of silver and of Maa Annapurna is made of ashtadhatu (astha means eight and dhatu means metal) which is an alloy of eight metals.

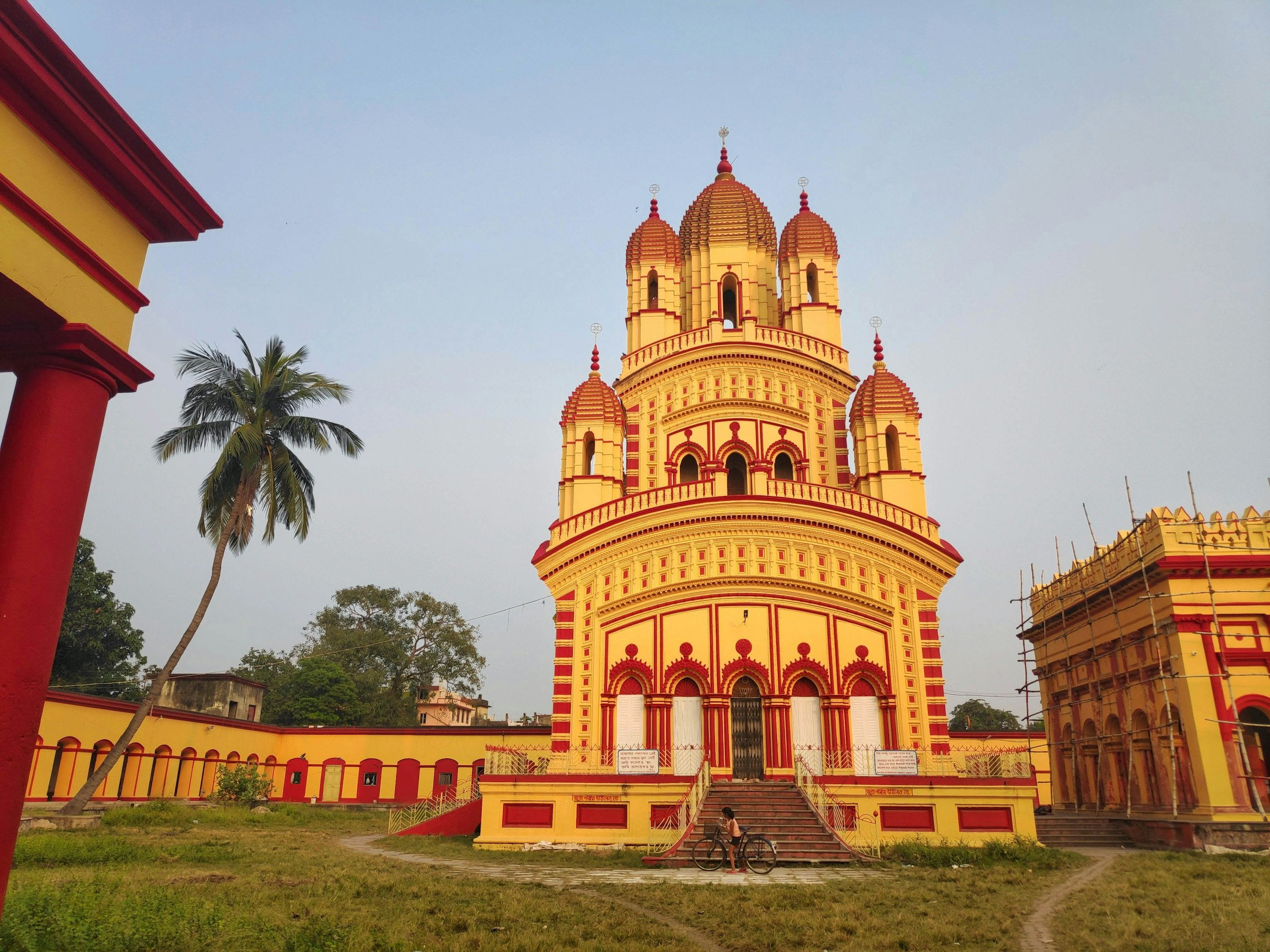
Sunset view of a child waiting outside the Annapurna Temple of Titagarh, near Barrackpore, West Bengal, India

== History ==
Annapurna Temple was built on 12 April 1875, by Jagadamba Devi, youngest daughter of Rani Rashmoni. She was married to Mathur Mohan Biswas, who after the death of his first wife Karunamoyee, married Jagadamba Devi. Their son Dwarikanath Biswas made all the arrangements for the establishment of this temple. The temple was opened to devotees by Ramakrishna. Inside the temple complex there is a Natmandir, six Shiva temples and two Nahabatkhanas.
