= My Master (book) =

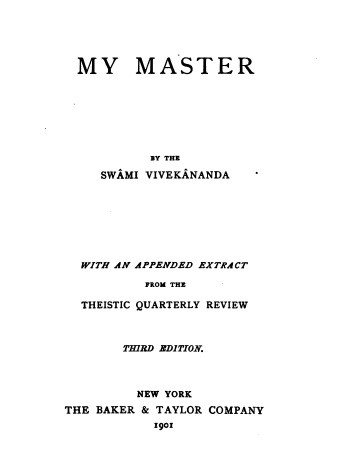
- Title page of 1901 edition
- Author: Swami Vivekananda
- Language: English
- Publisher: The Baker and Taylor Company
- Publication date: 1901
- Publication place: America
- Text: My Master at Wikisource

My Master is an English book combined from two lectures delivered by Swami Vivekananda in New York and England, published in 1901.

In the lecture Vivekananda clearly told, if there was even a single word of truth, a single word of spirituality in his lectures he owed it to his Master — Ramakrishna, only the mistakes were his own.

== Background ==
Vivekananda went to the West for the second time in 1899. At this time his health was declining and ailments such as asthma, diabetes and chronic insomnia restricted his activities. During this visit, Vivekananda gave few remarkable lectures in America and England. In these lectures Vivekananda covered a wide range of subjects from Indian history, Hindu mythological characters to human mind. The book My Master was compiled from two lectures delivered by Vivekananda in New York and England in 1901.

== Synopsis ==
In the lectures (therefore in the book) Vivekananda discussed Ramakrishna's biography. But, Vivekananda was well aware that his listeners were those Western people who had detailed idea on neither Ramakrishna nor India's religious and spiritual history and inheritance. That's why before entering the main topic of discussion, i.e. the life of Ramakrishna, he narrated the religious lives and religious ideals of India in details. He tried to show how the lives of Westerners and Indians were different, under which circumstances the reform movement began in Indian religions and Ramakrishna was born.

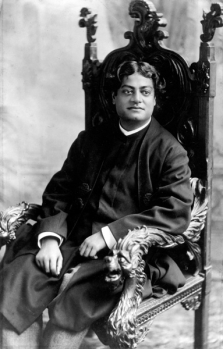
Swami Vivekananda in California in 1900

Next, Vivekananda started discussing the life of Ramakrishna from the beginning (i.e. birth of Ramakrishna in Kamarpukur in 1836). Though he presented every biographical detail in correct order, his main attempt was to draw a sketch of Ramakrishna's religious life and to show how Gadadhar Chattopadhyay (pre-monastic name of Ramakrishna) became Ramakrishna, a person venerated by thousands of Indians as an incarnation of God.

...if there has ever been a word of truth, a word of spirituality that I have spoken anywhere in the world, I owe it to my Master; only the mistakes are mine.

— Swami Vivekananda
in the book My Master (1901)

Vivekananda divided the life of Ramakrishna in two parts. He told, Ramakrishna spent the first part of his life in acquiring spiritual knowledge and the second part of his life, the remaining years, in distributing it for the welfare of the people.

Vivekananda discussed on different aspects of Ramakrishna's character. He told, in the presence of Ramakrishna, he discovered a man could be perfect, even in a human body. He told the lips of Ramakrishna never cursed or criticized anyone, nor his eyes saw any evil. The mind of Ramakrishna never thought of any evil, too. Vivekananda talked about the tremendous purity and renunciation Ramakrishna had and told that is the only secret of spirituality. It was Vivekananda's conclusion that Ramakrishna was the embodiment of spirituality.

== Publication ==
The book first published in 1901 in New York by The Baker and Taylor Company. The book contained an appended extract from a writing by Protap Chunder Mozoomdar, published in Theistic Quarterly Review in October 1979.

== Importance ==
Vivekananda was against coloring the life and activities of Ramakrishna. My Master is the only book where Vivekananda told something about his master Ramakrishna.
