= Shree Shyam Mandir Alambazar =

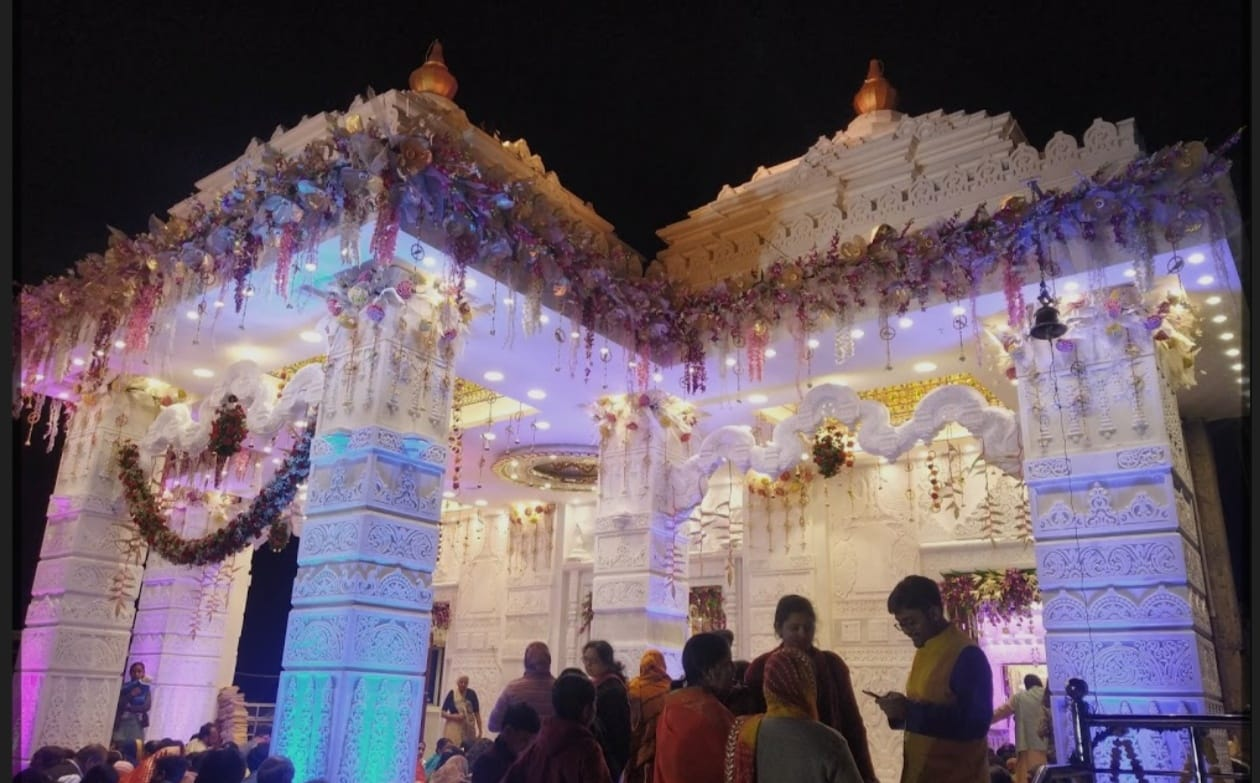

Religion
- Affiliation: Hinduism
- District: North 24 Parganas
- Deity: Shyam Baba

Location
- Location: Baranagar
- State: West Bengal
- Country: India
- Interactive map of Shree Shyam Mandir Alambazar
- Coordinates: 22.64881°N 88.36330°E

Architecture
- Creator: Alambazar Shree Shyam Dhwaja Mandal

Website
- https://shreeshyammandiralambazar.org/

Shree Shyam Mandir , Alambazar, is a temple located at 113, Surya Sen Road, Alambazar, in the Baranagar area of North Kolkata, West Bengal.Shree Shyam Mandir Alambazar is known as "Kolkata ka Khatudham".

== History ==
The temple was built by Alambazar Shree Shyam Dhwaja Mandal and with the support of thousands of Shyam devotees. According to the temple management, the project was initiated by Shri Govind Murari Agarwal, a devotee of Khatu Shyam Baba originally from Sikar district, Rajasthan, who later settled in Alambazar. His devotion led to the establishment of Shree Shyam Mandir Alambazar. The Bhoomi Pujan (ground-consecration ceremony) was held on 16 May 2010, marking the beginning of the temple project and structural work began on Akshaya Tritiya in 2013.The temple was crafted using Makrana marble by artisans from Rajasthan,adopting traditional Rajasthani architectural carving styles.

The building was completed by early 2020,when by the divine grace of Shyam baba his sacred presence was ceremoniously shifted to the first-floor sanctum sanctorum, in a spiritually sublime ceremony filled with prayers ,devotion, and heartfelt reverence of thousands of devotees and reported to be adorned with silver fittings.Governor,Shri Jagdeep Dhankar also visited Shree Shyam Mandir Alambazar after inauguration in 2020 and then again visited the temple in 2021 during Falgun Mela,one of the biggest festival celebrated at Shree Shyam Mandir Alambazar.

== Other Deities ==
The main sanctum of the temple houses the shrine of Baba Shyam,along with shrines dedicated to Radha and Krishna Ji Hanuman Ji, and the Shiva family.

Shyam Baba

Radha krishna

Hanuman Ji

Shiva Family

== Social Activity ==
The temple trust conducts several charitable and social initiatives:

- Blood donation camps.
- Free general health check-up and eye check-up camps.
- Seasonal blanket distribution drives.
- Daily twice community meal distribution(Bhandara).

== Temple timings ==
Shree Shyam Mandir Alambazar is open daily from 6:00 am to 1:00 pm and 4:00 pm to 10:00 pm.

Aarti Timings
Aartis	Time
Mangla Aarti	6:15 AM
Shringar Aarti	9:00 AM
Bhog Aarti	11:45 AM
Ekadashi Kirtan (every Ekadashi)	5:30 PM onwards
Sandhya Aarti	6:15 PM
Shayan Aarti	8:45 PM
