= Central Modern School =

School in Baranagar, India

The Central Modern School CMS Baranagar
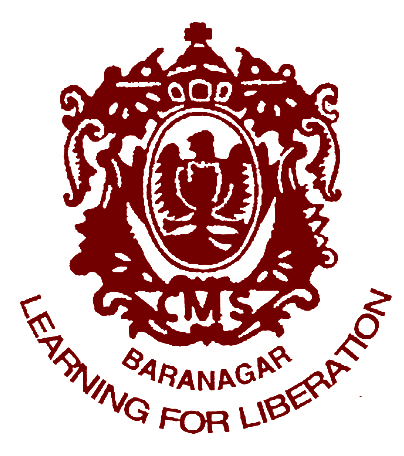
- 156 Maharaja Nanda Kumar Road, Kolkata 700036

Information
- Type: ICSE/ISC
- Motto: Learning for Liberation
- Established: 1988; 38 years ago
- Principal: Namrata De
- Website: www.centralmodernschool.in

Central Modern School is an English-medium co-educational (private) school located in Baranagar, West Bengal, India. The school educates pupils from the Pre-Preparatory class to the 12th grade. The school is affiliated with the Council for the Indian School Certificate Examinations (CISCE), New Delhi.

It was established in 1988 by founding father Mr Chittajit De.

== History ==
Established in 1988 as a Montessori School, followed closely by affiliation to the Council For The Indian School Certificate Examinations (CISCE), New Delhi, in 1992, Central Modern School emerged in the early 2000s as a Higher Secondary English Medium School with its own multi-storey building and assembly hall. Central Modern School's grew under its then Principal and Founder of the school - Mr Chittajit De. The school focuses on holistic education, with various extra-curricular activities like debates, arts, MUNs, dramatics, dancing etc.

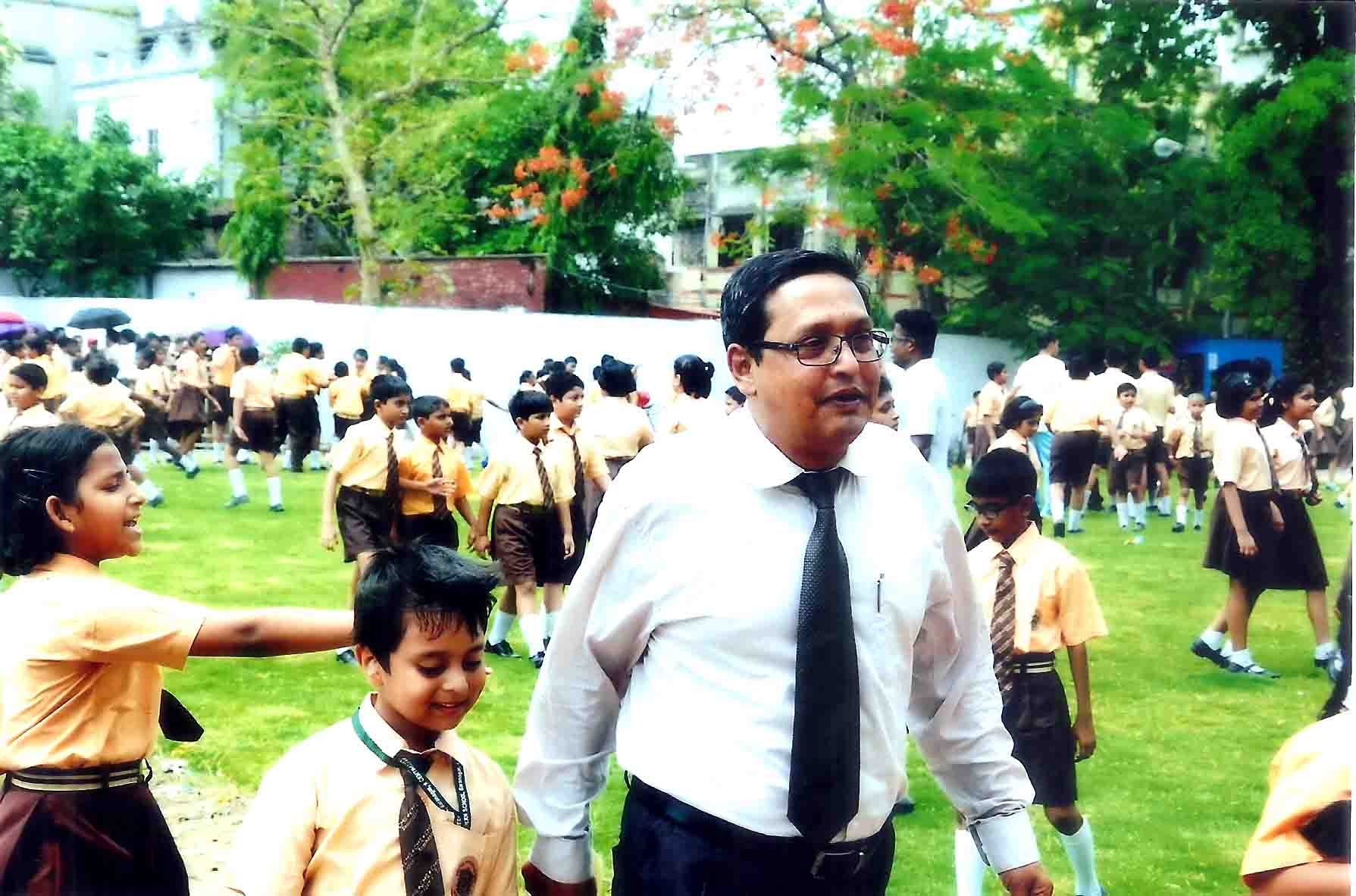
Founding Father : Mr. Nabarun De

Early in the year 2005, Mr Nabarun De became the Principal of the institution. Mr. De became the Convener of his zone, followed by the Secretary of the ASISC (WB and NE Chapter), Joint Secretary of the ASISC (National), Secretary of the West Bengal Private School's Association, and finally the Member of the General Body and executive committee of the CISCE, New Delhi, in just a short span of fifteen years from his appointment to office as the Principal of Central Modern School. In the year 2015, Mr De re-established the school a new five-acre campus.

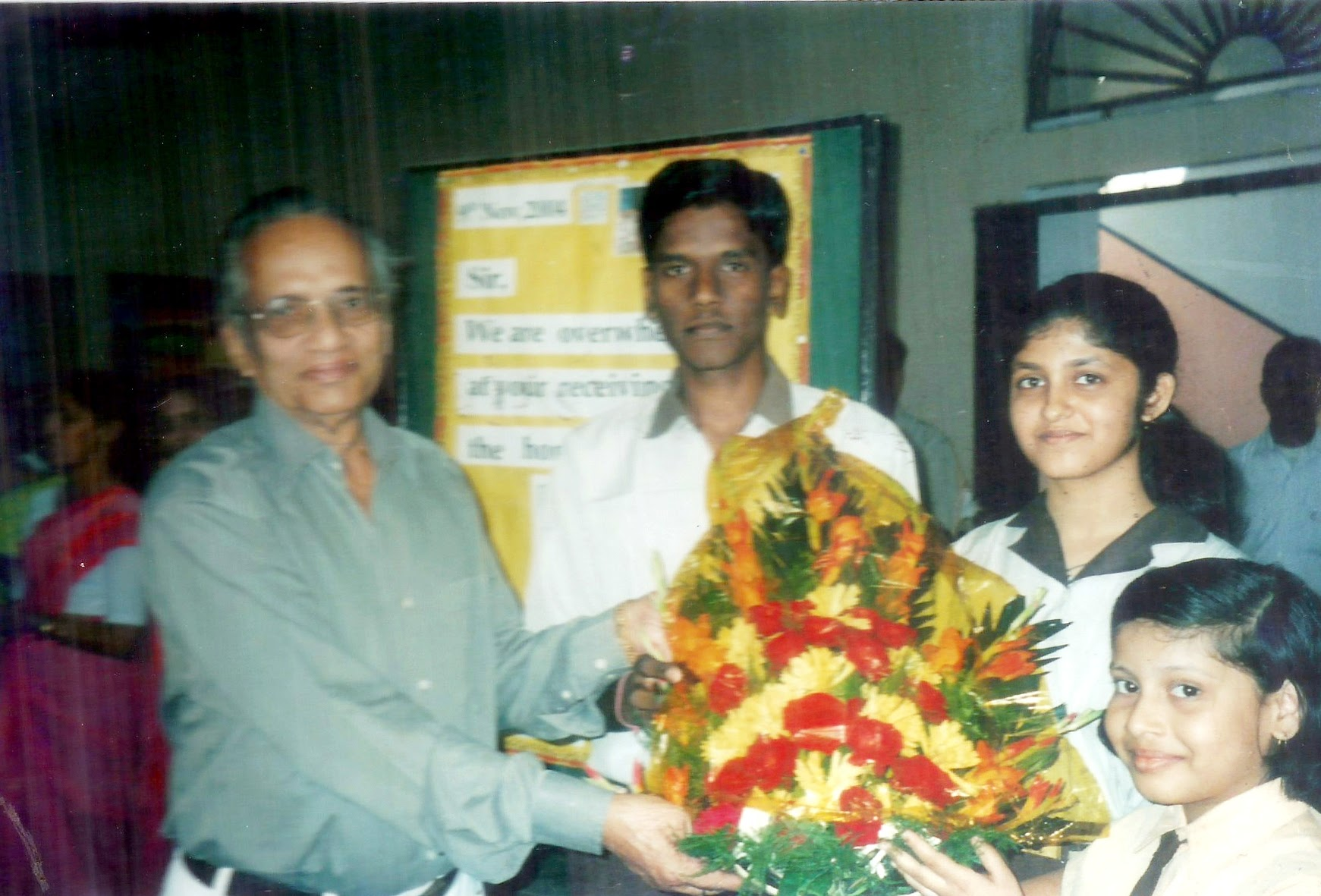
Founding Father - Mr Chittajit De

Mr Nabarun De died in November 2020.

== Motto ==
The school motto - “Learning for Liberation”, making quality education affordable.

== Academic achievement ==
- The school secured third rank among the ICSE results for 2013.

== Extra-curricular activities ==
The school hosts various extra-curricular activities like debates, chess, arts and craft, MUNs, dramatics, dancing etc. throughout the year. The school exhibitions provide opportunities for students to display their creativity and talents.

Sports are highly encouraged amongst students, with tournaments in football, cricket, kabaddi and throw-ball.

Seminars and workshops are organised for parents to emphasise on development of students.

=== School Houses ===
The House system in school has a significant role in both the curricular and co-curricular spheres of the students. The weekly House Activity class promotes newspaper reading and trains students in Public speaking ability.

School Houses
House Name	House colour
Starling	Red
Weaver	Yellow
Cuckoo	Blue
Roller	Green

Following list shows the winning house ( house with most points ) of each session since 2015-16 :

2015-16 : Starling ( 1 ) / 2016-17 : Roller / 2017-18 : Cuckoo ( 1 ) / 2018-19 : Starling ( 2 ) / 2019-20 : Cuckoo ( 2 ) / 2022-23 : Weaver / 2023-24 : Cuckoo ( 3 )/ 2024-25 : Roller(2)

== Other Activities ==
Along with various sporting activities, the school also excels in cultural ones. The school also hosts Dreamlite which is an event consisting of dramas, choirs and dance performances. It also host Essence of Knowledge which is a multidisciplinary exhibition. Both of the events take place bi-annually for two days.

The school also publishes its own magazine called Voyage which consists of writings, drawing and photographs submitted by teachers and students alike.

== See also ==
- List of schools in Kolkata
