= Noapara, Baranagar =

Neighbourhood in Baranagar of North 24 Parganas district, West Bengal, India

Noapara
- Neighbourhood
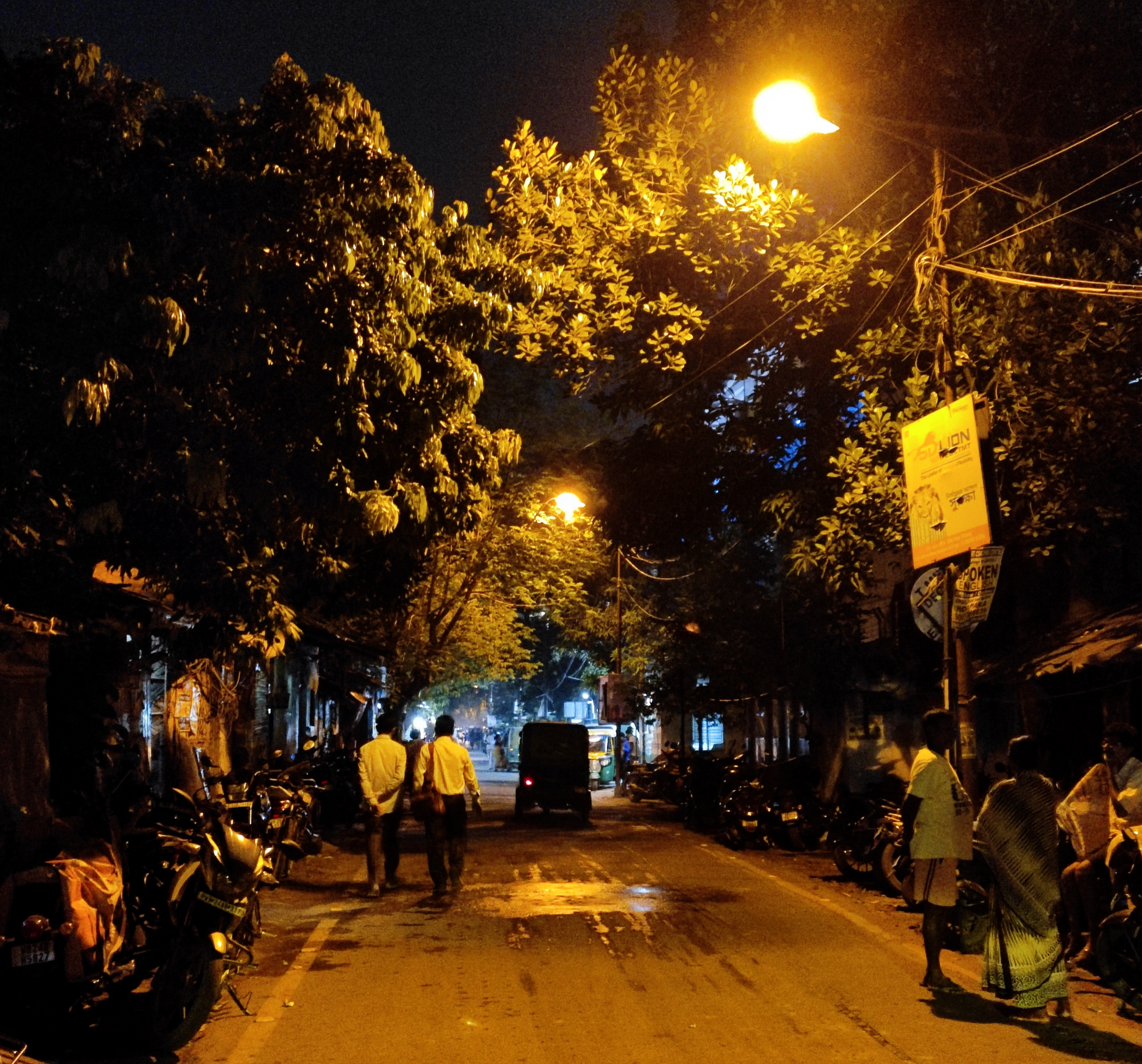
- AK Mukherjee Road

- Location in West Bengal, India Noapara (West Bengal) Noapara (India)
- Coordinates: 22.6428°N 88.3824°E
- Country: India
- State: West Bengal
- Division: Presidency
- District: North 24 Parganas
- Metro Station: Noapara

Government
  - Type: Municipality
  - Body: Baranagar Municipality

Languages
  - Official: Bengali, English
- Time zone: UTC+5:30 (IST)
- PIN: 700090
- Telephone code: +91 33
- Vehicle registration: WB
- Lok Sabha constituency: Dum Dum
- Vidhan Sabha constituency: Baranagar
- Kolkata Metro station: Noapara
- Website: baranagarmunicipality.org

Noapara is a locality in Baranagar of North 24 Parganas district in the Indian state of West Bengal. It is a part of the area covered by Kolkata Metropolitan Development Authority (KMDA).

== Geography ==
=== Location ===
Noapara is located at 22.6428°N 88.3824°E

=== Police station ===
Baranagar police station under Barrackpore Police Commissionerate has jurisdiction over Baranagar Municipal area.

== Transport ==
=== Road ===
A.K. Mukherjee Road is the artery of Noapara. It is also located near to B.T. Road. The bus stop near Noapara on B.T. Road is Tobin Road and many buses pass through here. The only bus (Private bus) that enters into Noapara is 34C (Noapara - Esplanade).

=== Train ===
Dum Dum Junction and Dum Dum Cantonment railway station are the nearest railway stations of Noapara.

=== Metro ===
Kolkata Metro Blue Line was extended up to Noapara metro station in 2013.

== Notable residents ==
- Tanmoy Bhattacharya
