= Baranagar =

City in West Bengal, India

- City
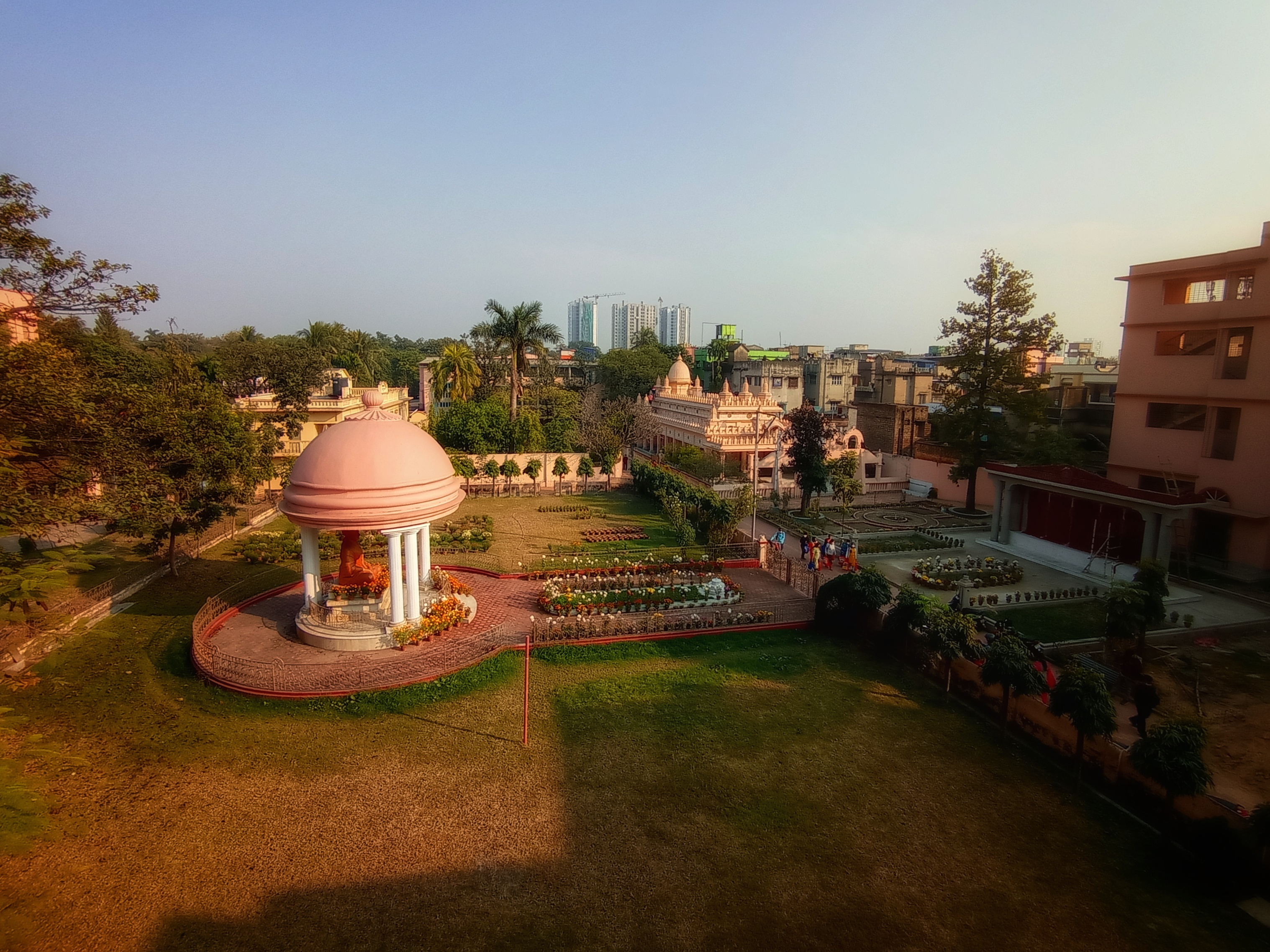
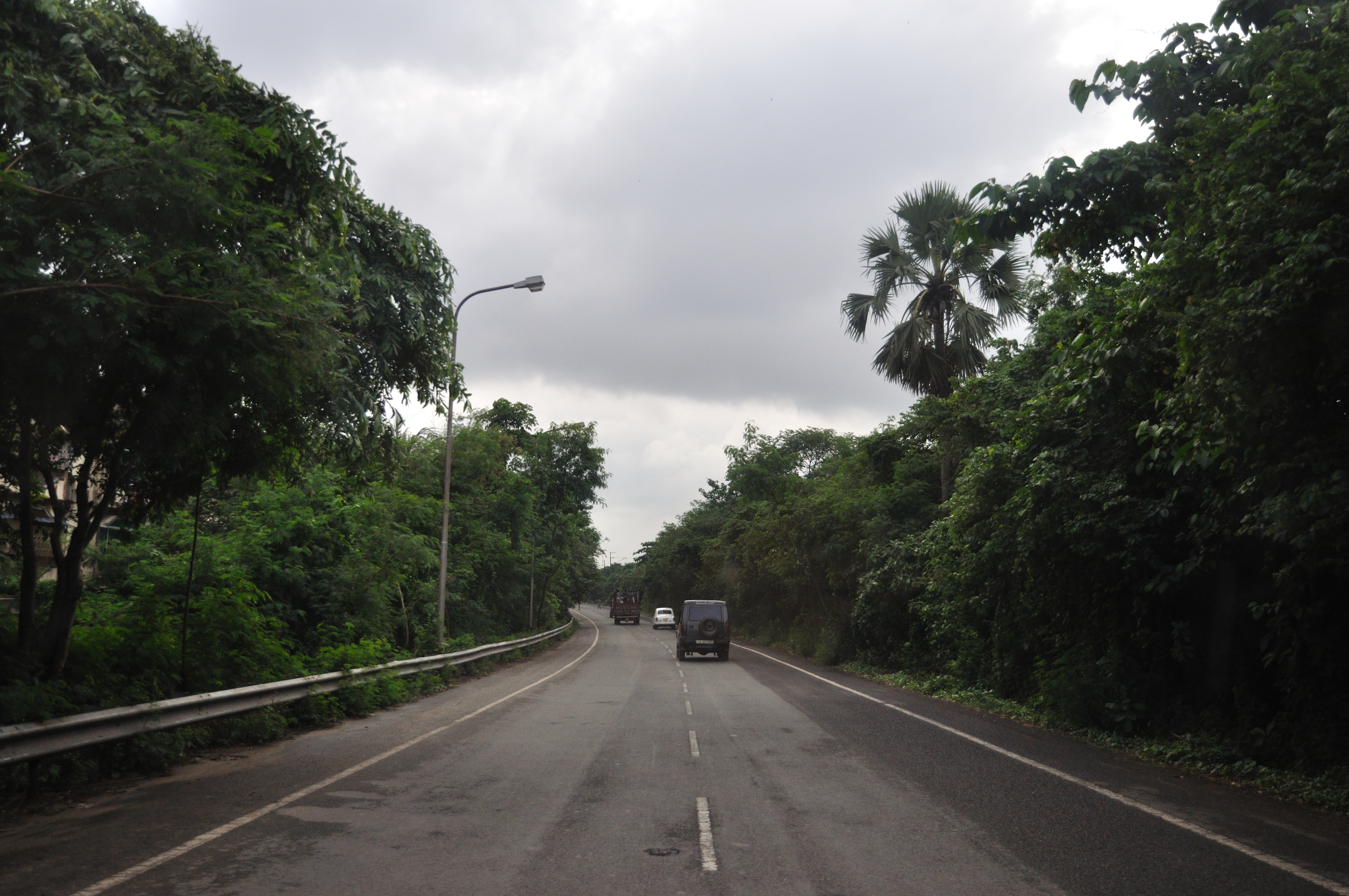
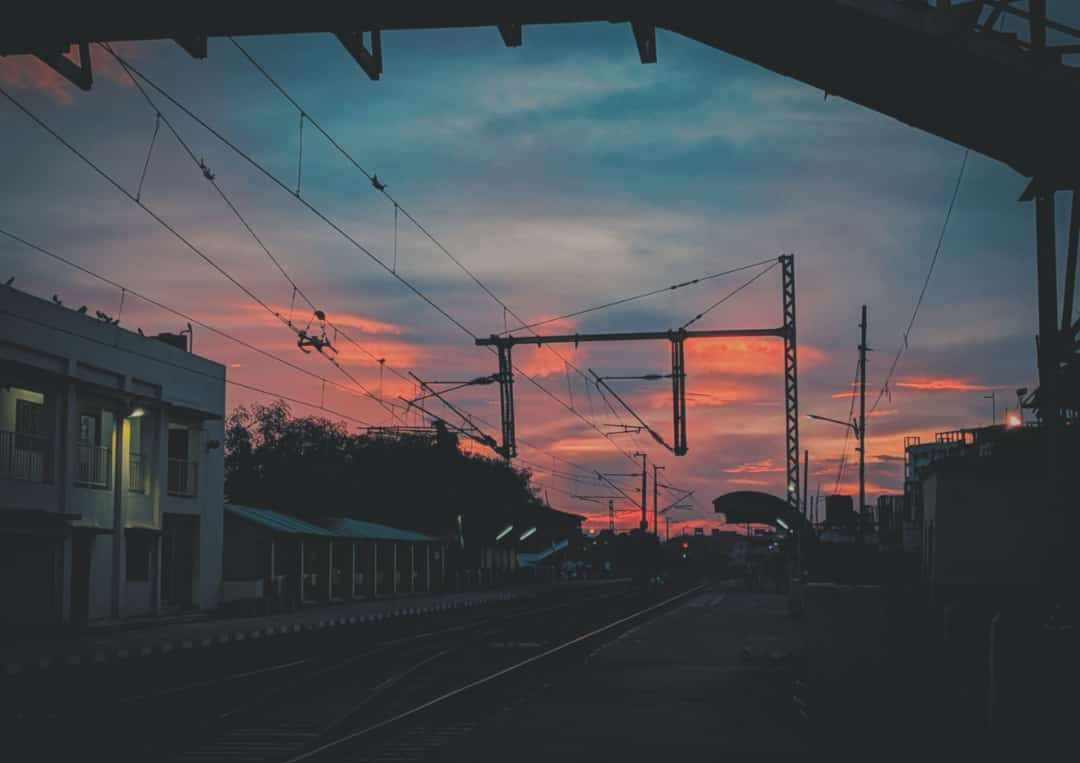
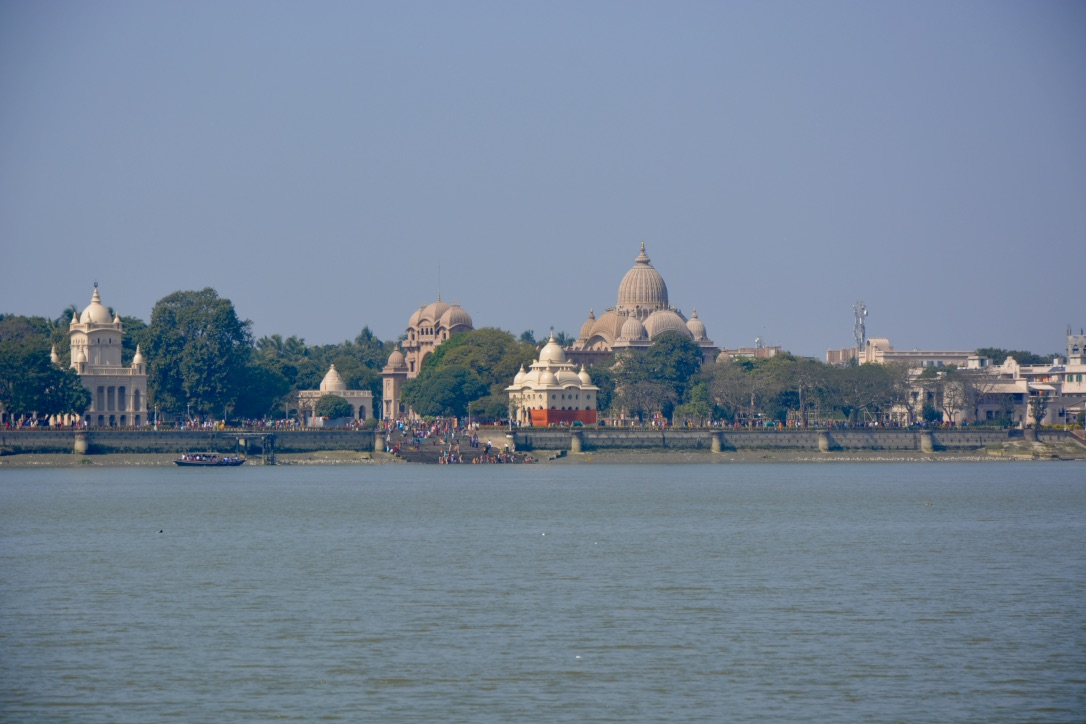
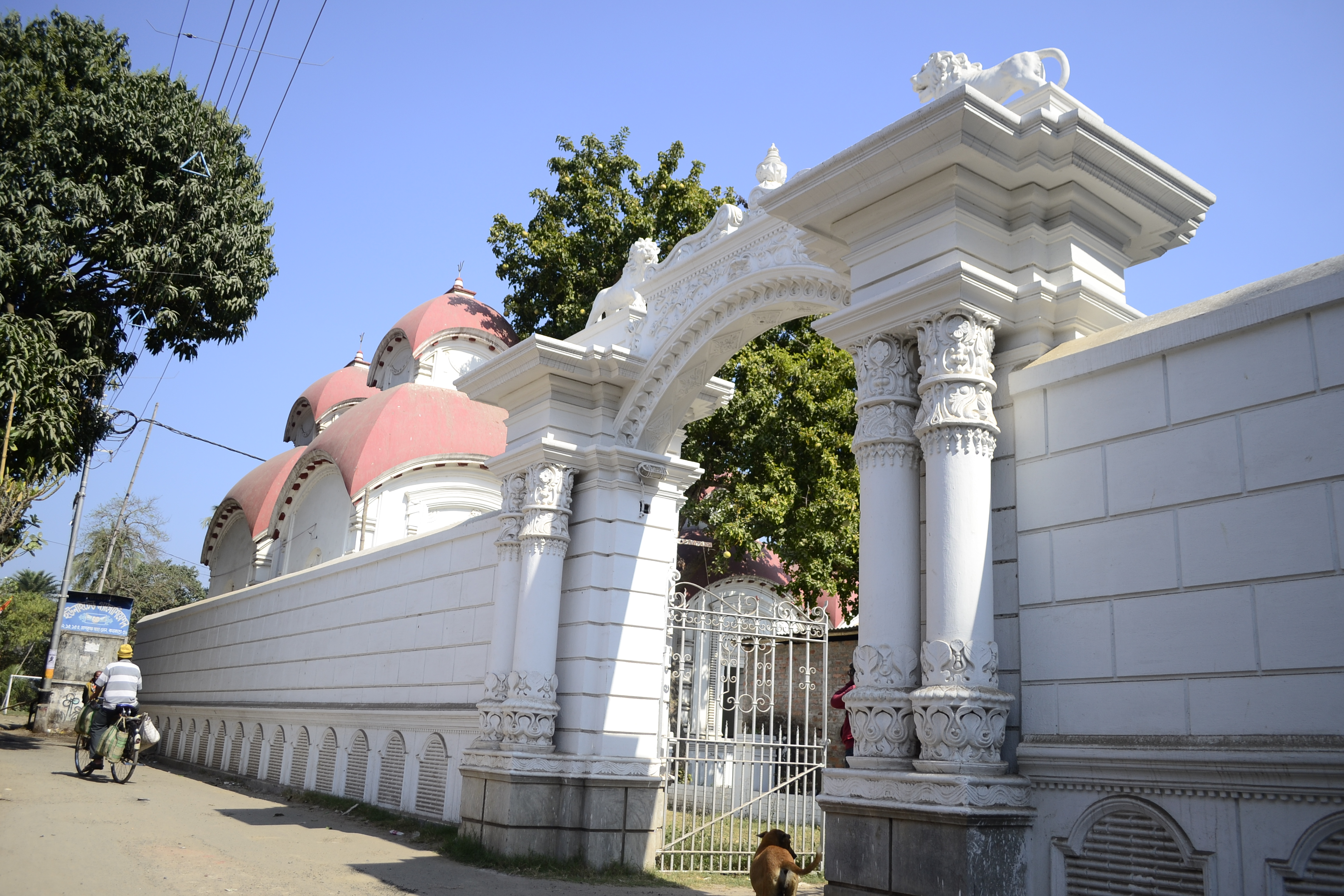
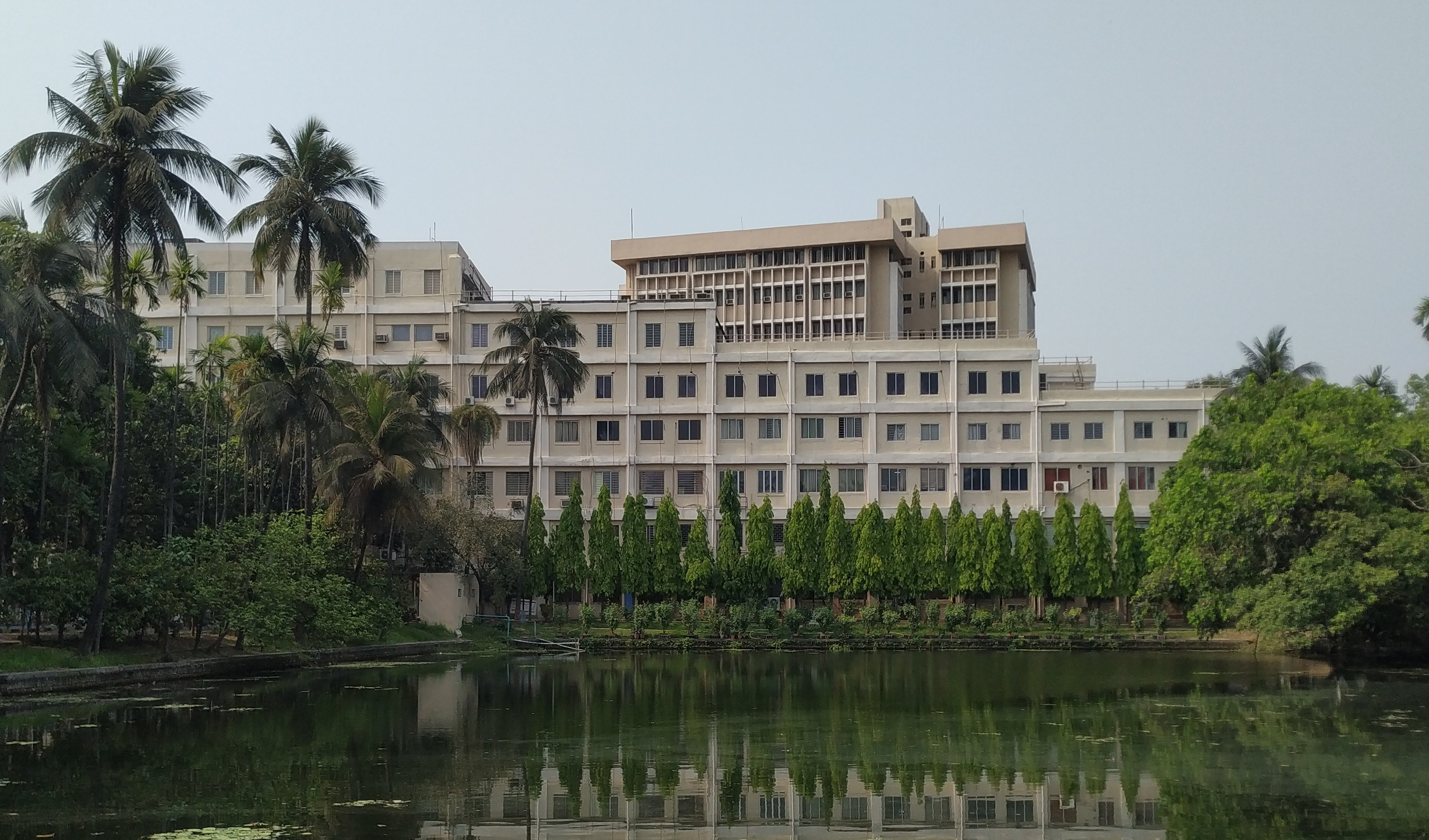
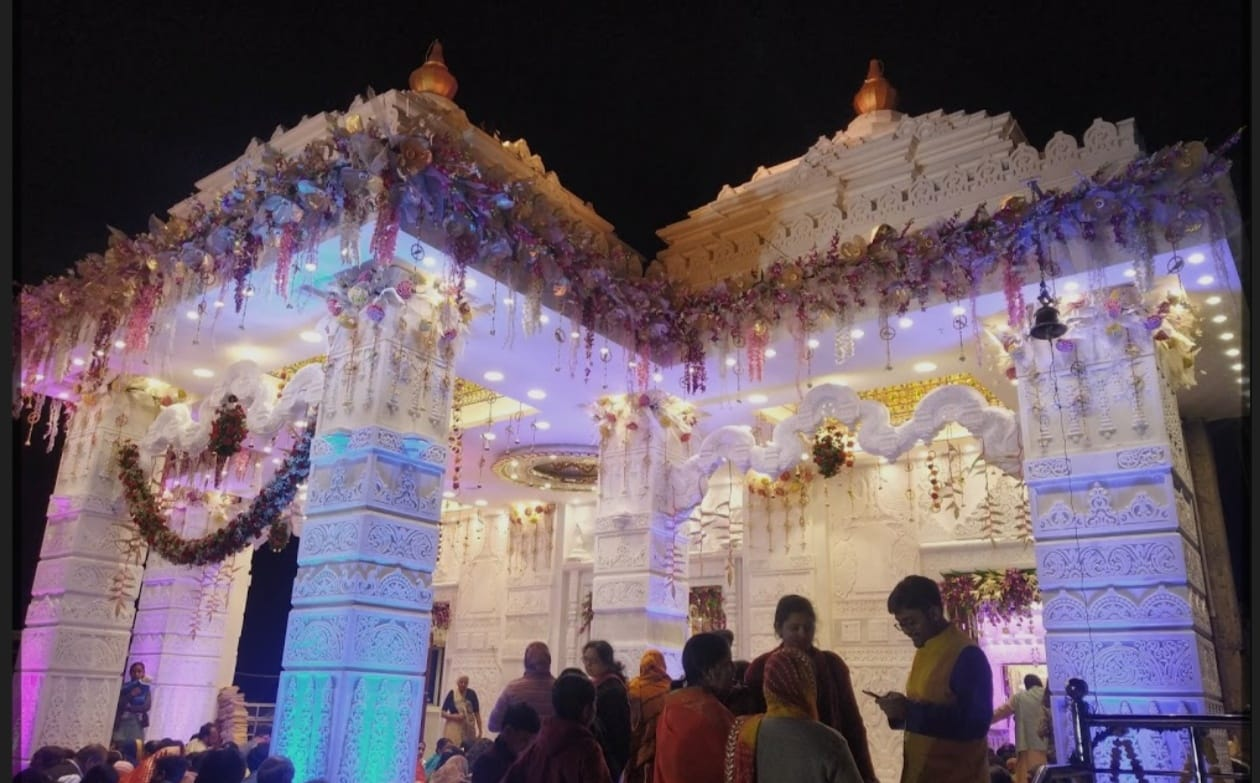
- Clockwise from top: Aerial view of Baranagar Ramakrishna Mission, Afternoon view of Baranagar station, Kripamayee Kali Temple, Indian Statistical Institute,Shree Shyam Mandir Alambazar, Ganges River, Belghoria Expressway

- Location in Kolkata Location in West Bengal Location in India
- Coordinates: 22.64°N 88.37°E
- Country: India
- State: West Bengal
- Division: Presidency
- District: North 24 Parganas
- Established: 1869; 157 years ago (as North Suburban Municipality) 1889; 137 years ago (as Baranagar Municipality)
- Wards: 34

Government
  - Type: Municipality
  - Body: Baranagar Municipality
  - Municipality Chairman: Aparna Moulik (TMC)
  - MLA: Sajal Ghosh (Bharatiya Janata Party)

Area
  - Total: 7.12 km^{2} (2.75 sq mi)
- Elevation: 12 m (39 ft)

Population (2011)
  - Total: 245,313
  - Rank: 18th (in West Bengal); 187th (in India)
  - Density: 35,220/km^{2} (91,200/sq mi)
  - Rank: 5th in the world

Languages
  - Official: Bengali, English
  - Literacy rate: 91.41%
- Time zone: UTC+5:30 (IST)
- PIN: 700035; 700036; 700090; 700108
- Telephone code: +91 33
- Vehicle registration: WB-23, WB-24
- Lok Sabha constituency: Dum Dum
- Vidhan Sabha constituency: Baranagar
- Sex ratio: 1000/943 (1.06) (♂️/♀️)
- Indian Railways station: Dum Dum Junction; Baranagar Road
- Kolkata Metro station: Baranagar; Noapara; Dum Dum
- Climate: Aw (Köppen)
- Precipitation: 1,770 millimetres (70 in)
- Avg. summer temperature: 31.7 °C (89.1 °F)
- Avg. winter temperature: 22.2 °C (72.0 °F)
- Website: baranagarmunicipality.org

Baranagar is a city and a municipality in the Kolkata Metropolitan Area of North 24 Parganas district in the Indian state of West Bengal. It is a part of the area covered by Kolkata Metropolitan Development Authority (KMDA).

It is home to the Indian Statistical Institute, an institution of national importance devoted to the research, teaching and application of statistics, natural sciences and social sciences. Baranagar Ramakrishna Mission Ashrama High School is one of the oldest and most renowned schools in Baranagar.

Baranagar is a major industrial centre for the manufacture of agricultural and industrial machinery, chemicals, castor oil, and matches; Baranagar is also home to numerous cotton-processing companies, offset & digital printing companies and book publishers.

Baranagar has many places of tourists attraction.Kolkata's khatudham ,Shree Shyam Mandir Alambazar is located in Alambazar,Baranagar.

== Etymology ==
The word Baranagar derives from the Bengali term Barahanagore (Bengali: বরাহনগর), meaning "City of the Hogs". (বরাহ: hog, নগর: city) Streynsham Master who visited the area in 1676 spoke of the hog factory where about 3,000 hogs a year were slaughtered and salted for export.

There are several explanations for the etymology of this name:

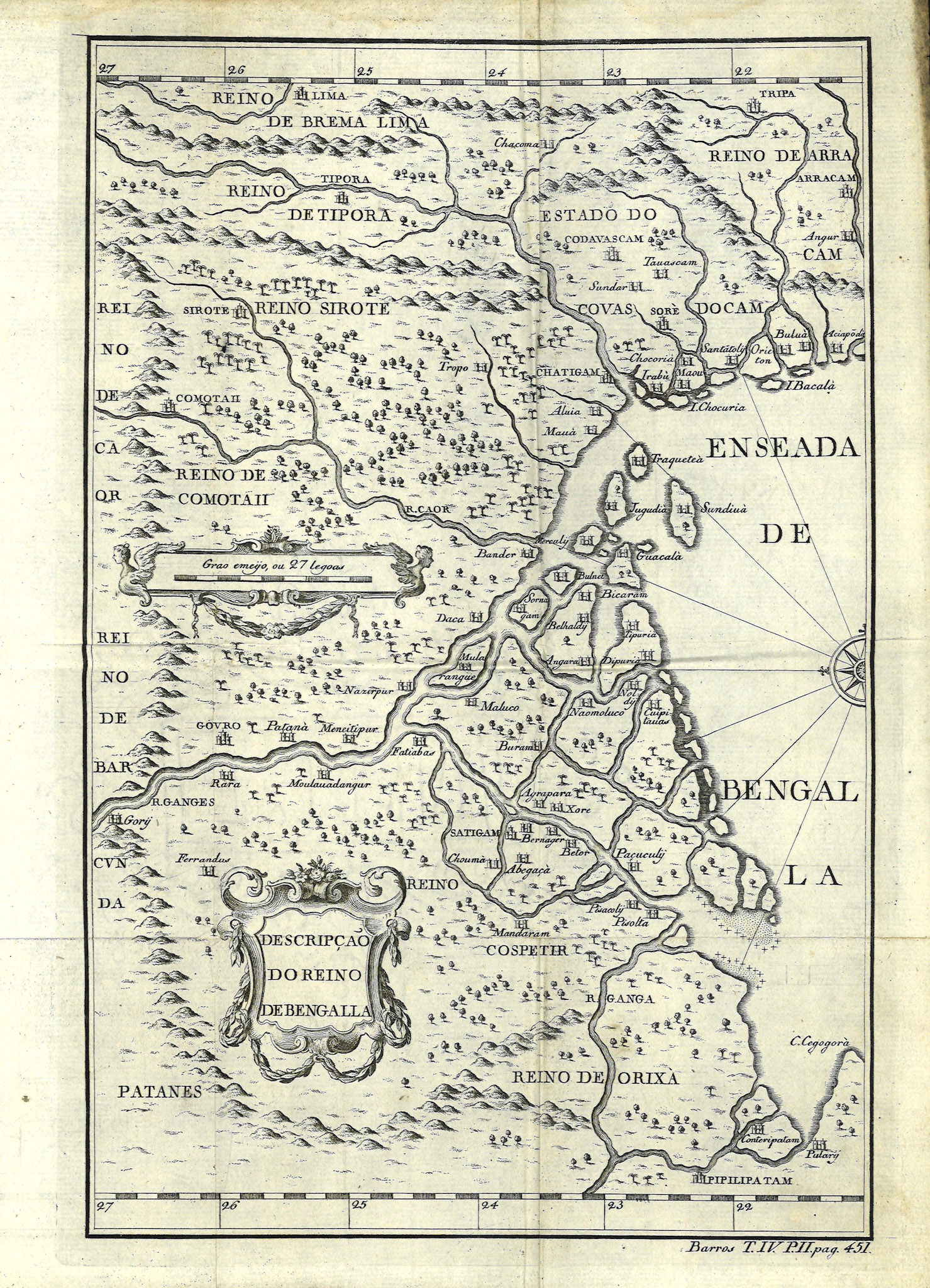
- Map of Bengal by De Barros in 1550 showing "Bernagar" which refers to Baranagar
  Cities and towns in the southern portion of Barrackpore subdivision in North 24 Parganas district
  M: municipal city/ town, CT: census town,
  N: neighbourhood/ administrative location
  Owing to space constraints in the small map, the actual locations in a larger map may vary slightly
  Baranagar or Barahanagar, meaning the "big" (Bara) and "town or land" (nagar) of the "pig" (baraha).
- Baranagar might be named after Varaha avatar of Vishnu.

== History ==
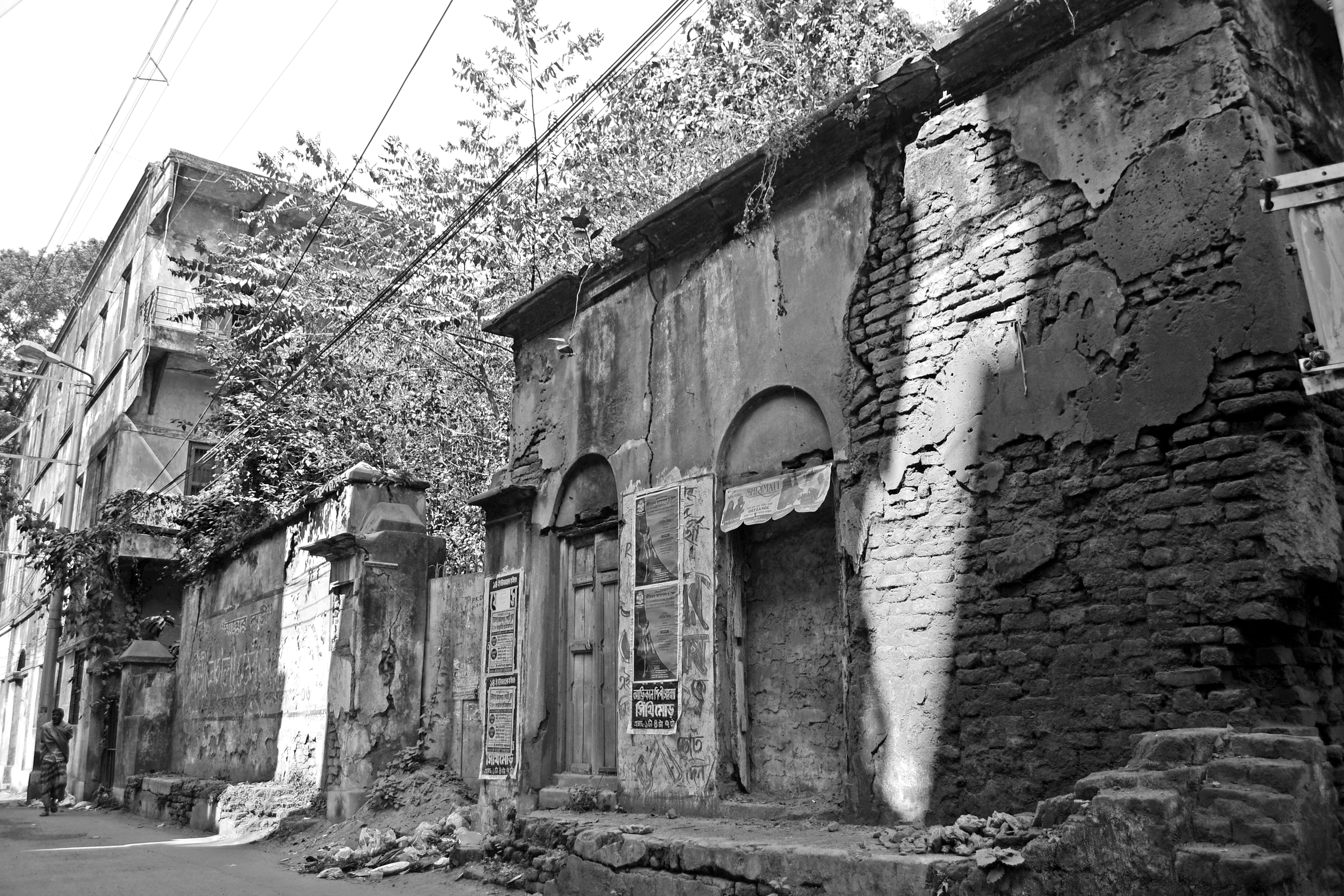
Nigerian Kuthi in Baranagar

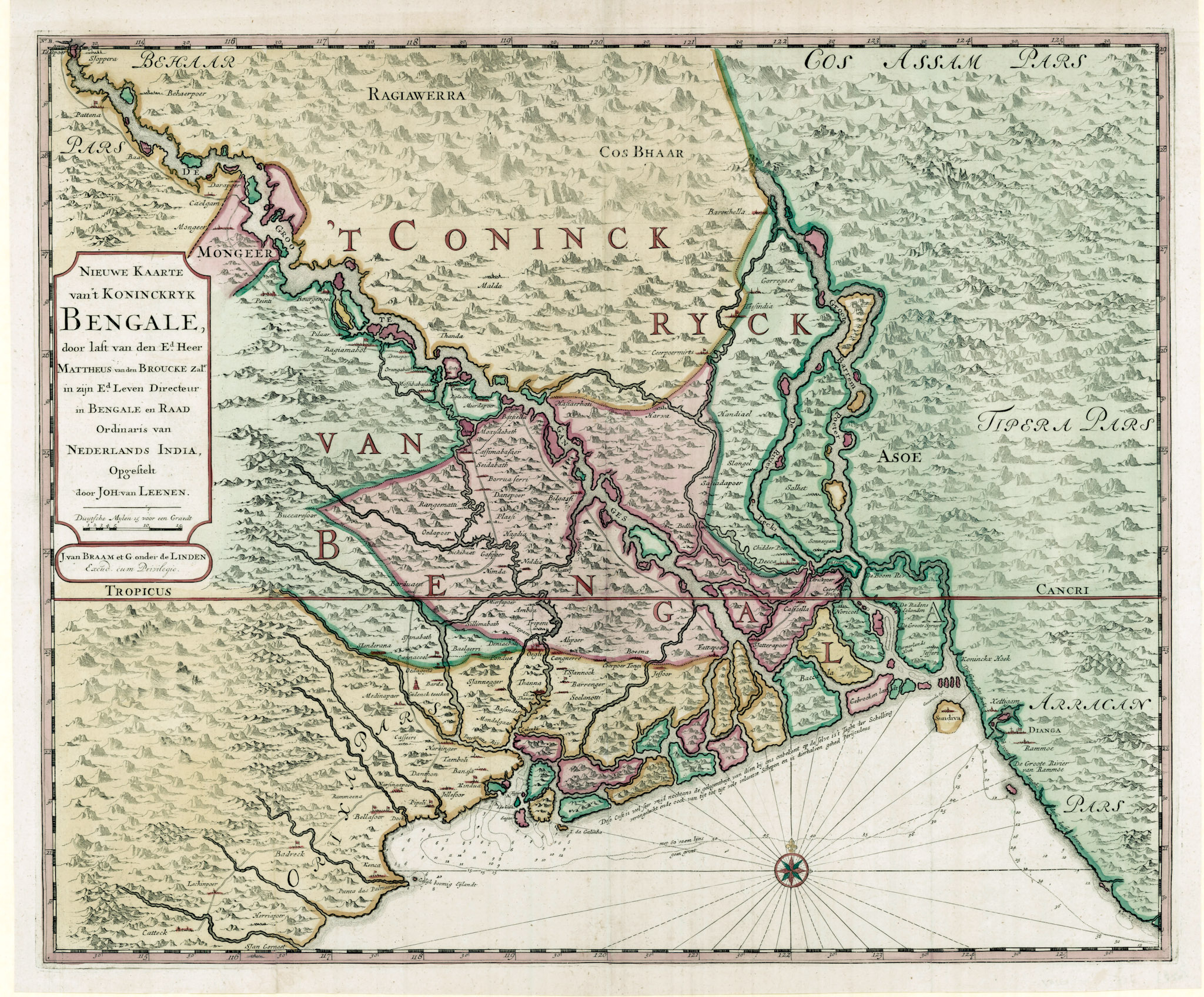
Map of Bengal by Van de Broucke in 1660 showing "Barrenger" which refers to Baranagar

The earliest reference of Baranagar can be found in Sri Sri Chaitanya Bhagabat written by Sri Brindaban Das where it was said that Chaitanya Mahaprabhu came to Baranagar in 1512. He writes:

হেন মতে পাণিহাটী গ্রাম ধন্য করি।

আছিলেন কথোদিন শ্রীগৌরাঙ্গ হরি ॥
তবে প্রভু আইলেন বরাহনগরে।
মহাভাগ্যবন্ত এক ব্রাহ্মণের ঘরে ॥
সেই বিপ্র বড় সুশিক্ষিত ভাগবতে।
প্রভু দেখি ভাগবত লাগিলা পড়িতে ॥
এতেক তোমার নাম ভাগবতাচার্য।

ইহা বিনে আর কোন না করিহ কার্য।

References to Baranagar can be found in many literary texts dating to 17th and 18th centuries. Even maps made by Dutch and Portuguese had references to Baranagar as "Bernagar" or "Barrenger".

Baranagar Municipality was established in 1869; it is one of the oldest municipalities in India. The Dutch had homes there in the seventeenth century. Streynsham Master who visited the area in 1676 spoke of the hog factory where about 3,000 hogs a year were slaughtered and salted for export. Later it became the centre for the extensive jute trade, manufacturing gunny bags. A major road (Surya Sen Road) parallel to the Hooghly River connects Baranagar Bazaar with Dakshineswar. In between temples such as Kaancher Mandir (i.e. Glass Temple), Joy Mitra Kali Bari and Pathbari are located.

Portuguese colonist first established their business camp here, which was in existence till 1862. Dutch settlers established their 'Kuthi' or office for business. Dutch supremacy ended with the arisen of British power in Bengal. M/s. Colvin Cow II Co. was the pioneer of industrial Baranagar. They founded a Sugar Mill near Alambazar. Later George Henderson founded Borneo Jute Factory at that site. In 1859, the factory was renamed Baranagar Jute Factory and is still in existence. The Baranagar Jute Factory was the first mechanical Jute Factory in India. During the two World Wars, many engineering factories were set up in Baranagar, and the town became famous as Industrial City. To provide civic amenities, North Suburban Municipality was formed in 1869 consisting of Chitpur and Cossipore (presently under Kolkata M.C.), all mouzas of present Baranagar Municipal Area along with Kamarhati, Ariadaha and Dakshineswar mouzas of present Kamarhati Municipality. In 1881 North Suburban Municipality was divided into two parts, 1) Cossipore- Chitpur Municipality (later amalgamated with Kolkata Municipal area) and 2) Baranagar Municipality. On 1 August 1899, Kamarhati Municipality was formed, parting Kamarhati and Ariadaha Mouzas from Baranagar. In 1949 Dakshineswar Mouza was parted from Baranagar and merged with Kamarhati Municipality.

Baranagar was one or majorly affected cities during the Naxalbari Uprising. In the early 1970s, a massacre took place in the city as the Congress led Indian state retaliated against the political movement. The joint operation of the police and criminals attacked alleged Naxalites as well as their family members. The family of a Congressman wasn't spared either. Grotesque killings took place as more than 100-1000 people were torched, gunned down or hacked to death. The police never bothered to give any official number. There has been call for a judicial enquiry but none took place even after 50 years have passed. The culprits were never brought to books. There are allegations by political activists that those policemen who were involved in the killings were later promoted to higher ranks.

In Kuthighat (Baranagar), there was an old house/lodge of Nigerian merchants.

== Geography ==
=== Location ===
Baranagar is located at 22.64°N 88.37°E. It has an average elevation of 12 metres (39 feet). It is situated east of the Hooghly River. Baranagar Municipal area lies between Sinthee More and Dunlop.

Baranagar is bounded by Dakshineswar and PWD Road on the north, Noapara metro depot and adjacent areas of South Dum Dum on the east, Sinthee and Cossipore in Kolkata district on the south and Hooghly river on the west.

=== Police Station ===
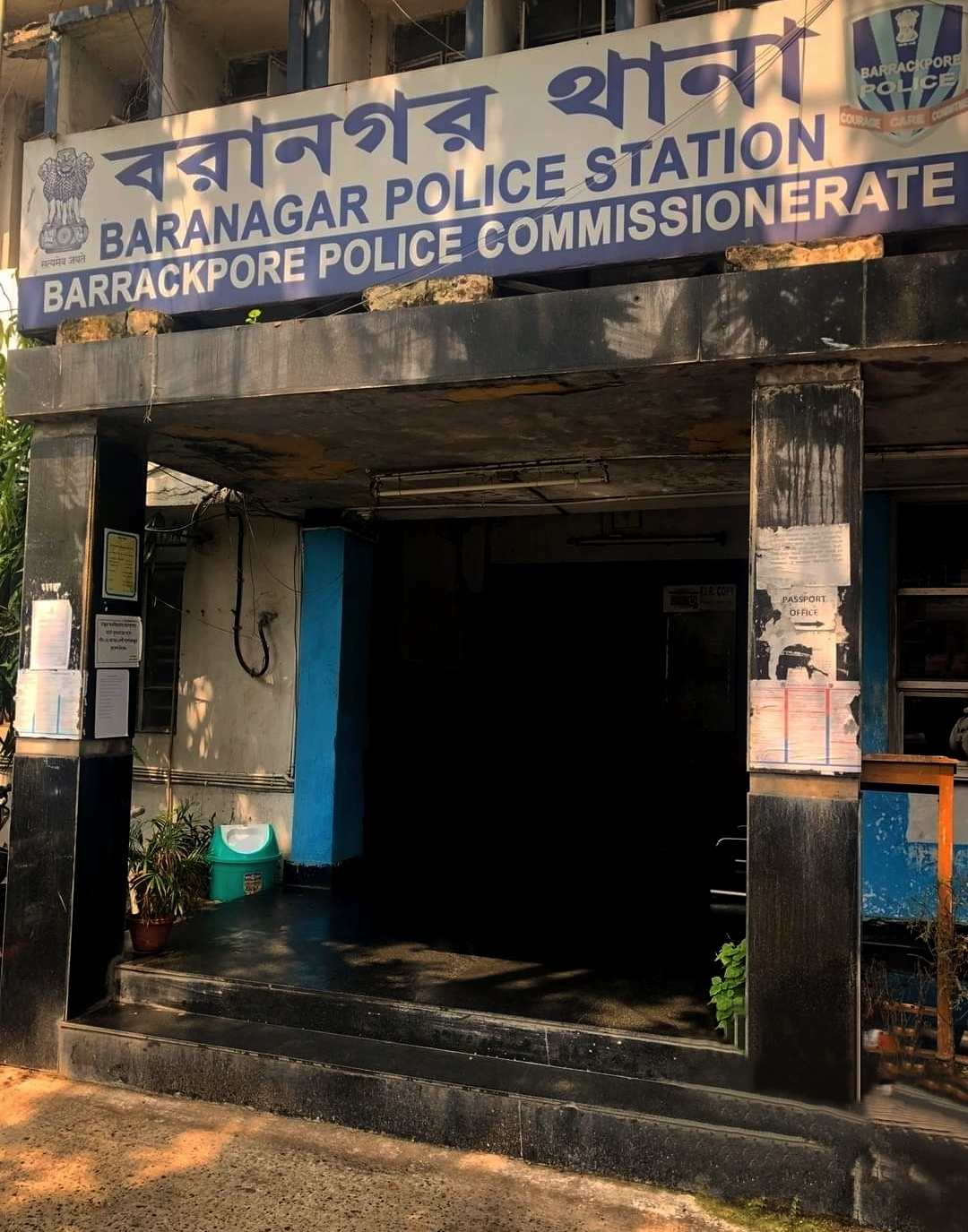
Baranagar police station

Baranagar police station under Barrackpore Police Commissionerate has jurisdiction over the parts of Baranagar Municipal areas.

=== Climate ===
In summer, i.e. from April to June, the weather remains hot and temperatures range from a maximum of 38 °C (100 °F) to a minimum of 25 °C (77 °F).

Monsoon season prevails during beginning-June to mid-September. Also retrieving monsoon from mid-October till mid-November.

The weather is quite pleasant, the summers and winters are moderate. The level of moisture increases during summers.

Climate data for Baranagar
Month	Jan	Feb	Mar	Apr	May	Jun	Jul	Aug	Sep	Oct	Nov	Dec	Year
Mean daily maximum °C (°F)	26.4 (79.5)	29.1 (84.4)	33.5 (92.3)	35.3 (95.5)	35.4 (95.7)	34 (93)	32.3 (90.1)	32.1 (89.8)	32.4 (90.3)	32.3 (90.1)	30.3 (86.5)	27 (81)	31.7 (89.0)
Mean daily minimum °C (°F)	13.8 (56.8)	16.9 (62.4)	21.7 (71.1)	25.1 (77.2)	26 (79)	26.5 (79.7)	26.1 (79.0)	26.1 (79.0)	25.8 (78.4)	23.9 (75.0)	19.6 (67.3)	14.5 (58.1)	22.2 (71.9)
Average precipitation mm (inches)	20 (0.8)	40 (1.6)	40 (1.6)	60 (2.4)	140 (5.5)	280 (11.0)	400 (15.7)	340 (13.4)	280 (11.0)	140 (5.5)	20 (0.8)	10 (0.4)	1,770 (69.7)
Average rainy days	4	3	4	6	12	18	23	22	18	11	3	1	125
Source: Baranagar Weather

== Notable residents ==
=== Spiritual Leaders ===
- Ramakrishna
- Sitaramdas Omkarnath
- Sarada Devi
- Swami Vivekananda
- Ramakrishnananda
- Swami Brahmananda
- Rani Rashmoni
- Chaitanya Mahaprabhu
- Swami Yogananda
- Swami Premananda
- Swami Niranjanananda
- Swami Shivananda
- Swami Saradananda
- Swami Abhedananda
- Swami Adbhutananda
- Swami Turiyananda
- Swami Advaitananda
- Swami Trigunatitananda
- Swami Subodhananda
- Swami Akhandananda
- Swami Vijnanananda
- Swami Tathagatananda

=== Academician and Writers ===
- Rabindranath Tagore
- Manik Bandopadhyay
- Sharadindu Bandyopadhyay
- Sanjib Chattopadhyay
- Bhaskar Chakraborty
- Prasanta Chandra Mahalanobis
- Dwijesh Dutta Majumdar
- Bidyut Baran Chaudhuri
- C. A. Murthy

=== Sports ===
- Dola Banerjee
- Rahul Banerjee
- Atanu Das

=== Entertainment ===
- Sisir Bhaduri
- Ganapati Chakraborty
- Jaya Bachchan (née Bhaduri)
- Sabitri Chatterjee
- Rudraprasad Sengupta
- Swatilekha Sengupta
- Sohini Sengupta
- Jeet Gannguli
- Shiboprosad Mukherjee
- Abhishek Chatterjee
- Shaan
- Manas Mukherjee
- Sagarika

=== Others ===
- Rajkumari Banerji
- Sasipada Banerji
- Tanmoy Bhattacharya
- Prabhabati Bose (née Dutta) (Mother of Subhas Chandra Bose)

== Demographics ==
=== Population ===
Historical population
Year	Pop.	±%
1901	25,432	—
1911	25,895	+1.8%
1921	32,084	+23.9%
1931	37,050	+15.5%
1941	54,451	+47.0%
1951	77,126	+41.6%
1961	107,837	+39.8%
1971	136,842	+26.9%
1981	170,343	+24.5%
1991	224,831	+32.0%
2001	250,768	+11.5%
2011	245,213	−2.2%
Source: Census of India

As per the 2011 Census of India, Baranagar had a total population of 245,213, of which 126,187 (51%) were males and 119,026 (49%) were females. Population below 6 years was 16,825. The total number of literates in Baranagar was 208,779 (91.41% of the population over 6 years), male literates are 110,118 (93.69%) and female literates are 98,661 (89%).

As of 2001 India census, Baranagar had a population of 250,615. Males constitute 53% of the population and females 47%. Baranagar has an average literacy rate of 82%, higher than the national average of 59.5%; with 55% of the males and 45% of females literate. 8% of the population is under 6 years of age.

Religion in Baranagar
Religion	Population (1941)	Percentage (1941)	Population (2011)	Percentage (2011)
Hinduism	45,109	82.84%	232,839	94.95%
Islam	8,874	16.29%	7,269	2.96%
Sikhism	5	0.01%	2,810	1.15%
Christianity	242	0.44%	653	0.26%
Others	221	0.40%	1,642	0.68%
Total Population	54,451	100%	245,213	100%

=== Languages ===
Languages spoken in Baranagar City (2011)
1. Bengali (81.3%)
2. Hindi (14.5%)
3. Urdu (1.59%)
4. Punjabi (1.17%)
5. Odia (0.40%)
6. Others (1.03%)

Almost 82% of the population speaks Bengali while 15% speaks Hindi and Urdu. There is a significant Punjabi speaking population as well owing to the significant Sikh population who migrated here during 1984 anti-Sikh riots. There has been significant increase in Hindi-Urdu speaking population due to migration from Uttar Pradesh and Bihar. Some localities within the city now has Hindi as the dominant language.

Religions in Baranagar
Religion	Percent
Hindus	94.95%
Muslims	2.96%
Sikhs	1.15%
Christians	0.26%
Jains	0.14%
Buddhists	0.02%
Others†	0.5%
†includes irreligious and religion not stated (~0.5%).

Literacy in Baranagar
Literacy	Percent
Male	93.69%
Female	89%
All	91.41%

=== Kolkata Urban Agglomeration ===
The following Municipalities, Census Towns and other locations in Barrackpore subdivision were part of Kolkata Urban Agglomeration in the 2011 census: Kanchrapara (M), Jetia (CT), Halisahar (M), Balibhara (CT), Naihati (M), Bhatpara (M), Kaugachhi (CT), Garshyamnagar (CT), Garulia (M), Ichhapur Defence Estate (CT), North Barrackpur (M), Barrackpur Cantonment (CB), Barrackpore (M), Jafarpur (CT), Ruiya (CT), Titagarh (M), Khardaha (M), Bandipur (CT), Panihati (M), Muragachha (CT) New Barrackpore (M), Chandpur (CT), Talbandha (CT), Patulia (CT), Kamarhati (M), Baranagar (M), South Dumdum (M), North Dumdum (M), Dum Dum (M), Noapara (CT), Babanpur (CT), Teghari (CT), Nanna (OG), Chakla (OG), Srotribati (OG) and Panpur (OG).

== Infrastructure ==
As per the District Census Handbook 2011, Baranagar Municipal city covered an area of 7.12 km^{2}. Amongst the civic amenities it had 160.23 km of roads and both open and closed drains. Amongst the medical facilities it had 55 medicine shops. Amongst the educational facilities it had 49 primary schools, 33 middle schools, 33 secondary schools, many higher secondary schools and 2 non-formal education centres. Amongst the social, recreational and cultural facilities it had 2 cinema/theatres and 2 auditorium/ community halls. It had 20 bank branches.

== Economy ==
Baranagar was once economically enriched for many Industrial factories like "Bengal Immunity company", "Baranagar Jute Mill". Hessian, sacking, fabrics, carpets and bags from jute (Corchorus spp) are manufactured in the jute mill, while almost every other factories are now permanently shut down. The Baranagar Jute Mill is one of the oldest jute mills still running. The service sector includes the rest of the city's economy. Baranagar is also home to numerous cotton-processing companies, offset & digital printers and Purushottam Publishers, an academic book publishing company.

=== KMDA ===
Baranagar municipality is included in the Kolkata Metropolitan Area for which the KMDA is the statutory planning and development authority.

== Transport ==
=== Metro railways ===
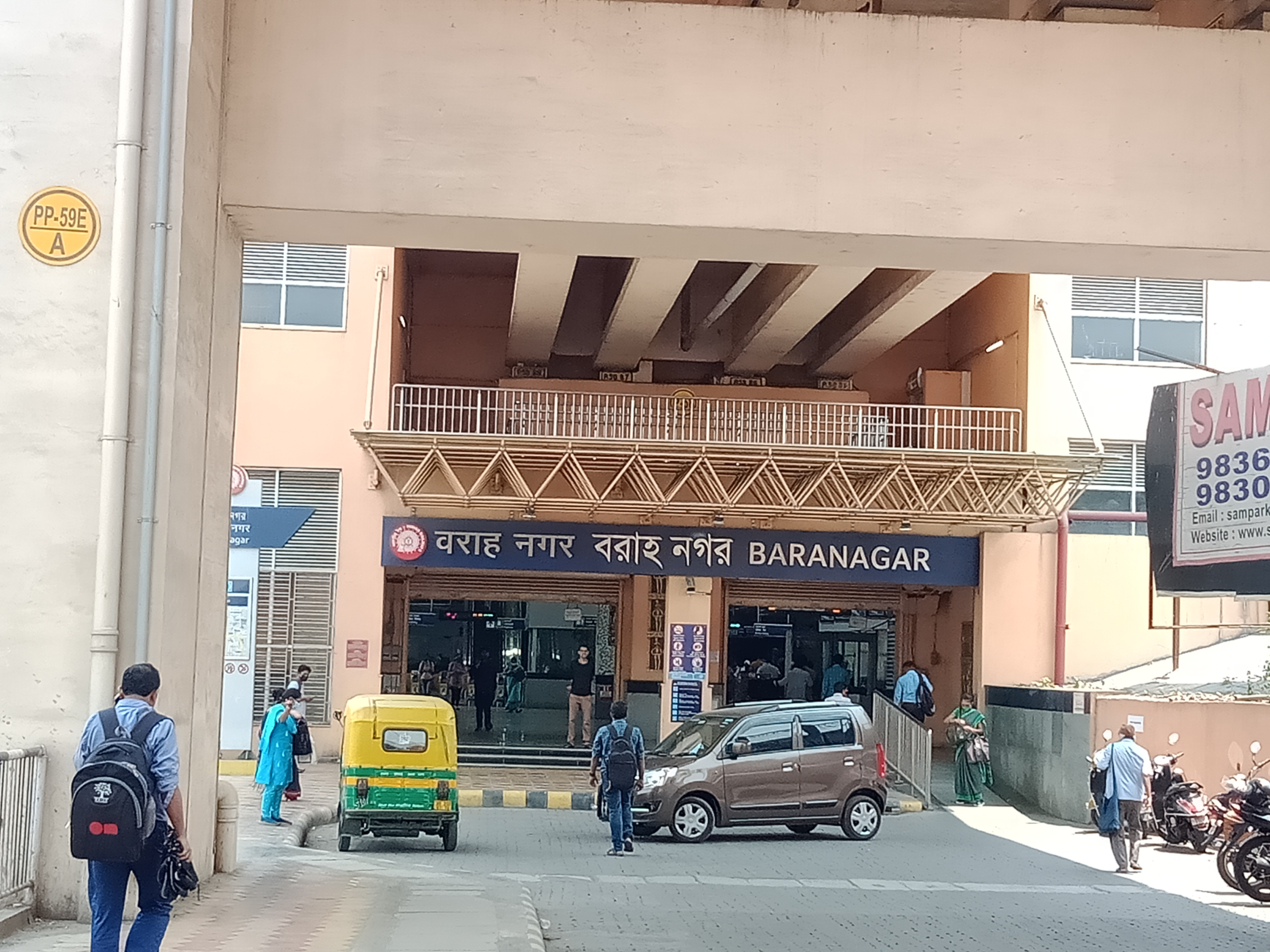
Baranagar metro station

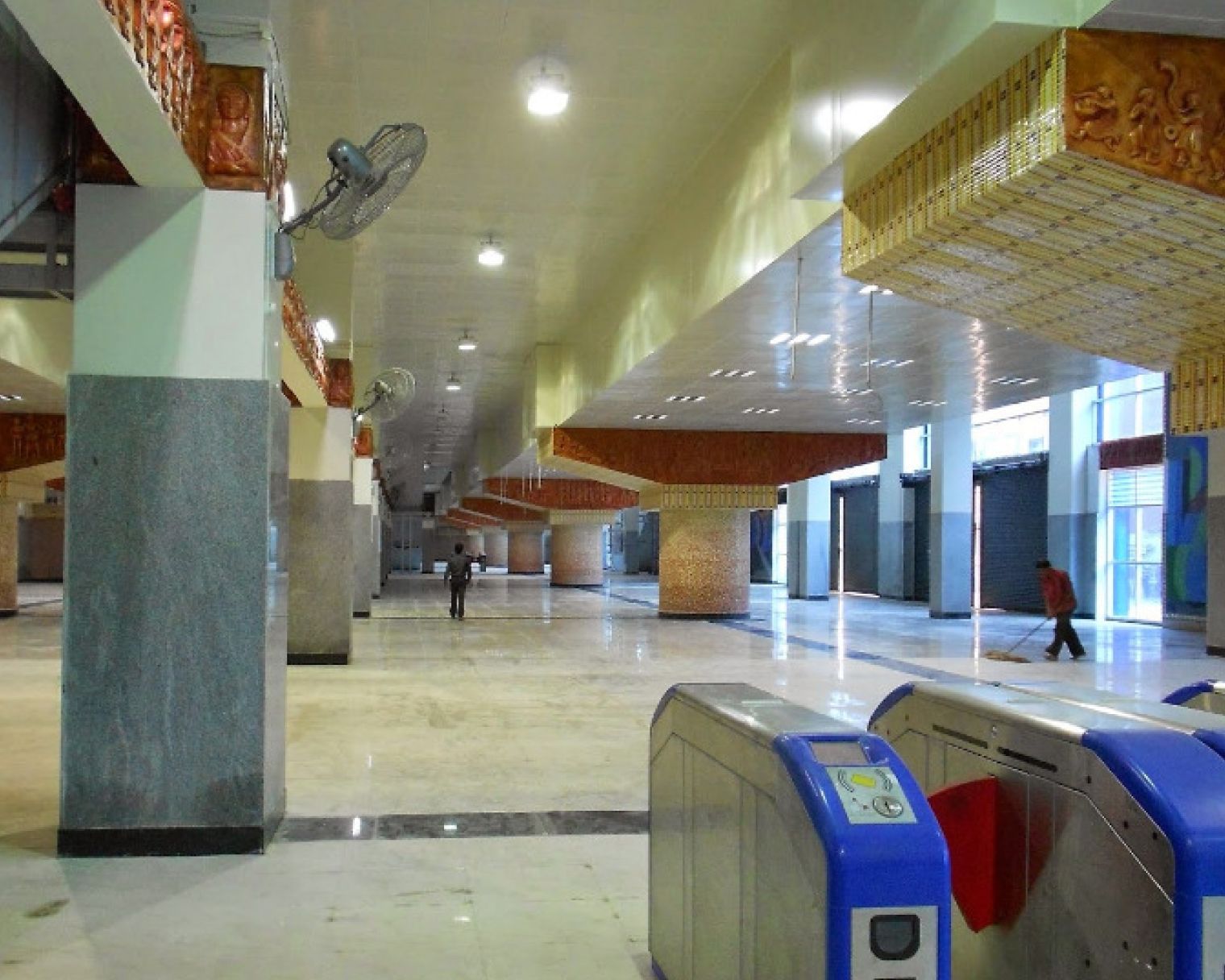
Noapara metro station

Noapara metro station is situated at Noapara in Baranagar. As of 2013, it was Kolkata Metro's largest station. The extension of Blue Line from Dum Dum to Dakshineswar was sanctioned in 2010–11. It was extended up to Noapara in 2013. The subsequent work was held up because of the encroachments on railway land. Baranagar metro station is currently operational. Located adjacent to Baranagar Road railway station this station was inaugurated on 22 February 2021 and commercial run started on the following day.

=== Road ===
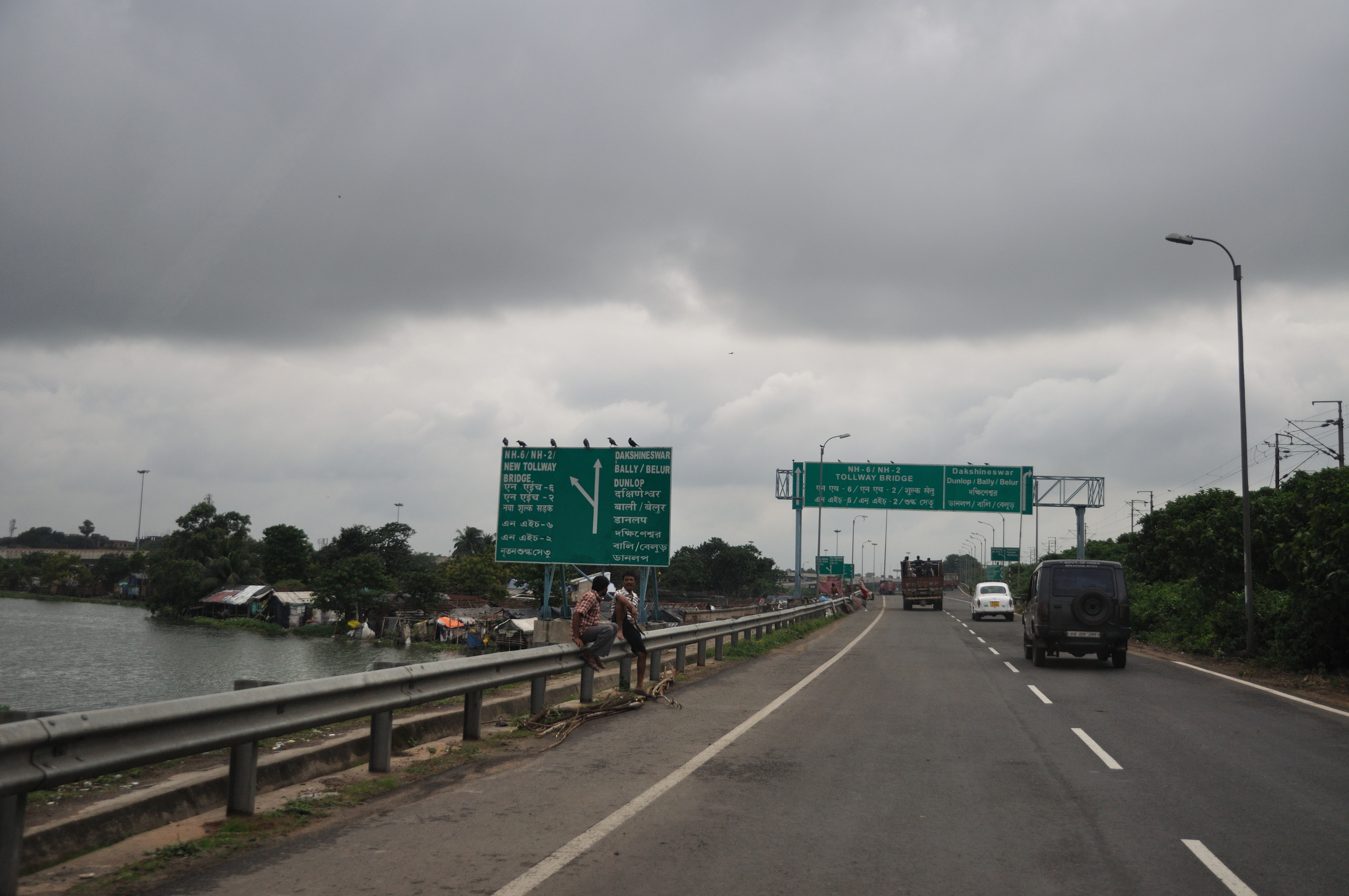
Belghoria Expressway

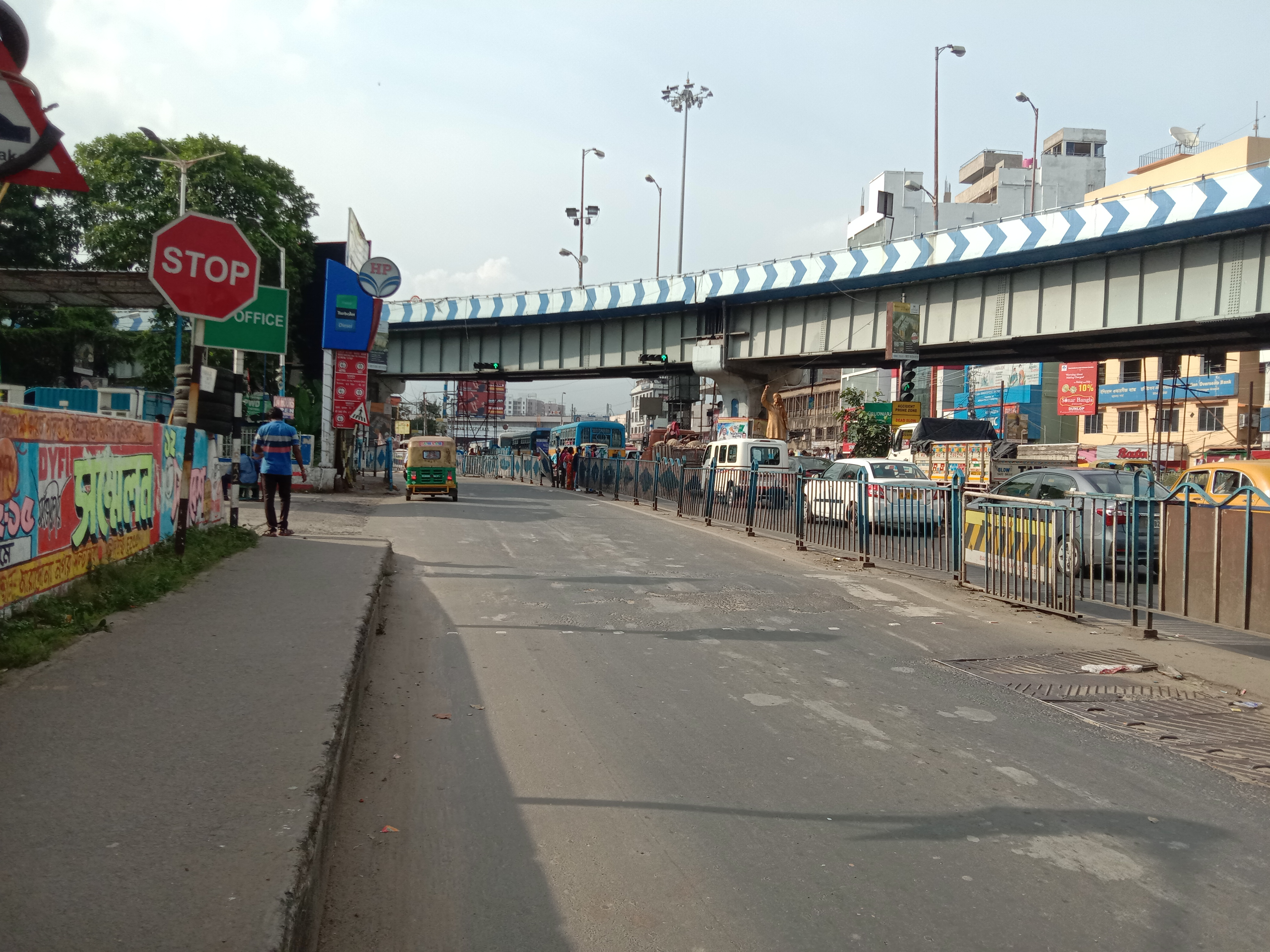
BT Road in Dunlop.

Barrackpore Trunk Road (part of both SH 1 and SH 2) passes through Baranagar. Belghoria Expressway also passes through Baranagar. Dunlop Crossing is one of the largest crossings near Kolkata which connects Kolkata with Northern suburban areas and Howrah, Hooghly. Another important road is Gopal Lal Tagore Road which is connected to B.T. Road at Sinthee More (via Kashi Nath Dutta Road), at Tobin More (via Baghajatin Road) and also at Dunlop. Gopal Lal Tagore Road is also connected to Dakshineswar via Deshbandhu Road-Surya Sen Road (through Alambazar).

=== Bus ===
Bus route numbers 26, 32A, 34B, 43, 242, 56, 78, 78/1, 79, 81/1, 201, 214, 214A, 222, 230, 234, 234/1, 285, DN2/1, DN9/1, DN43, DN44, DN46, S164 (Mini), S180 (Mini), S185 (Mini), AC54, AC54B, S9A, E32, S32, ACT-32, S17A, S57, AC20, S23A, AC23A, AC50A, C23, K4, S58, S11 etc. ply through these roads in Baranagar.

=== Ferry ===
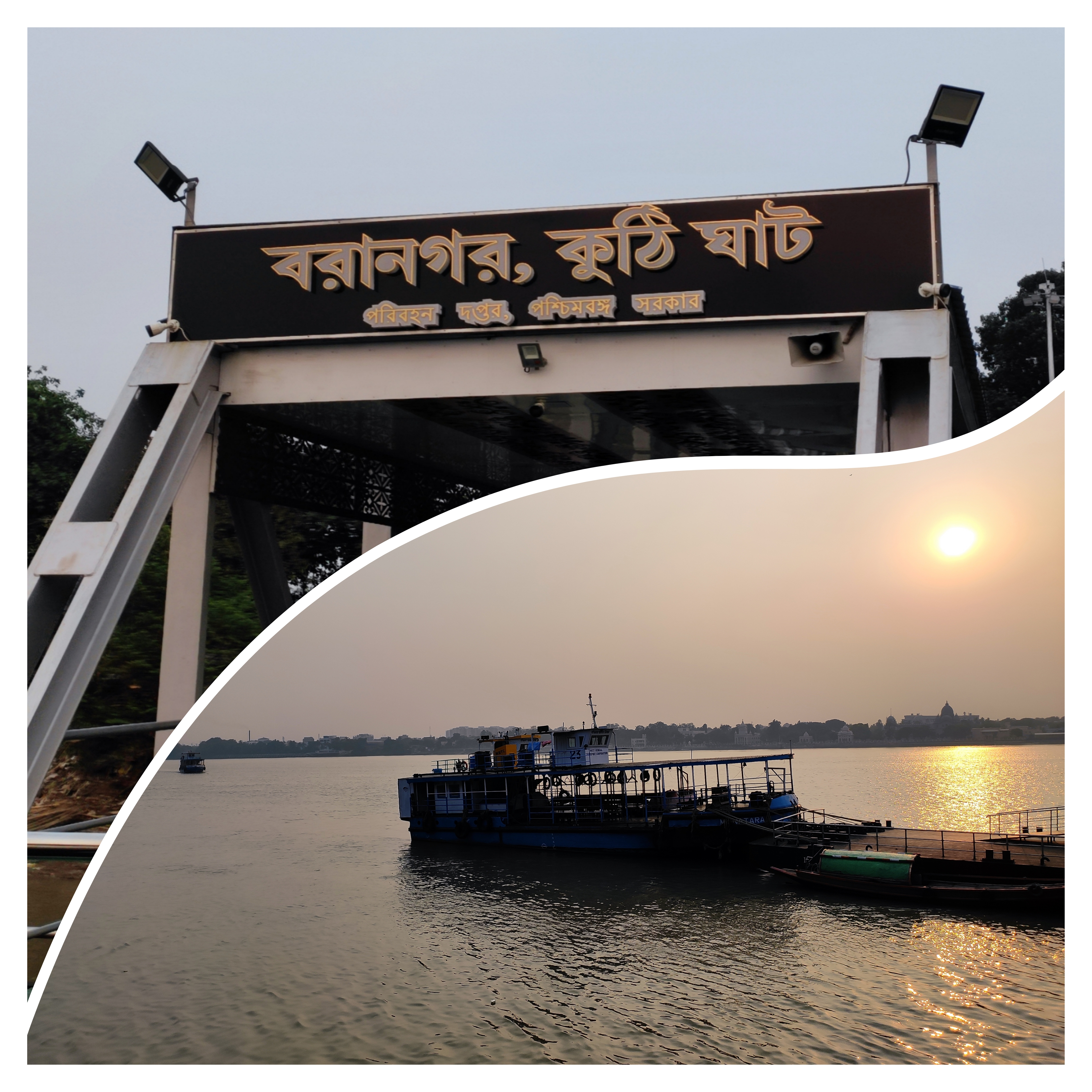
Baranagar Kuthi Ghat

Transport in water pathway was once held by boat, launch and bhutbhuti from Baranagar's Kuthi Ghat to Howrah and Belur of Howrah district, Cossipore and Bagbazar of Kolkata district, Uttarpara of Hooghly district, Dakshineshwar and Ariadaha of North 24 Parganas district on the river Ganges.

=== Railways ===
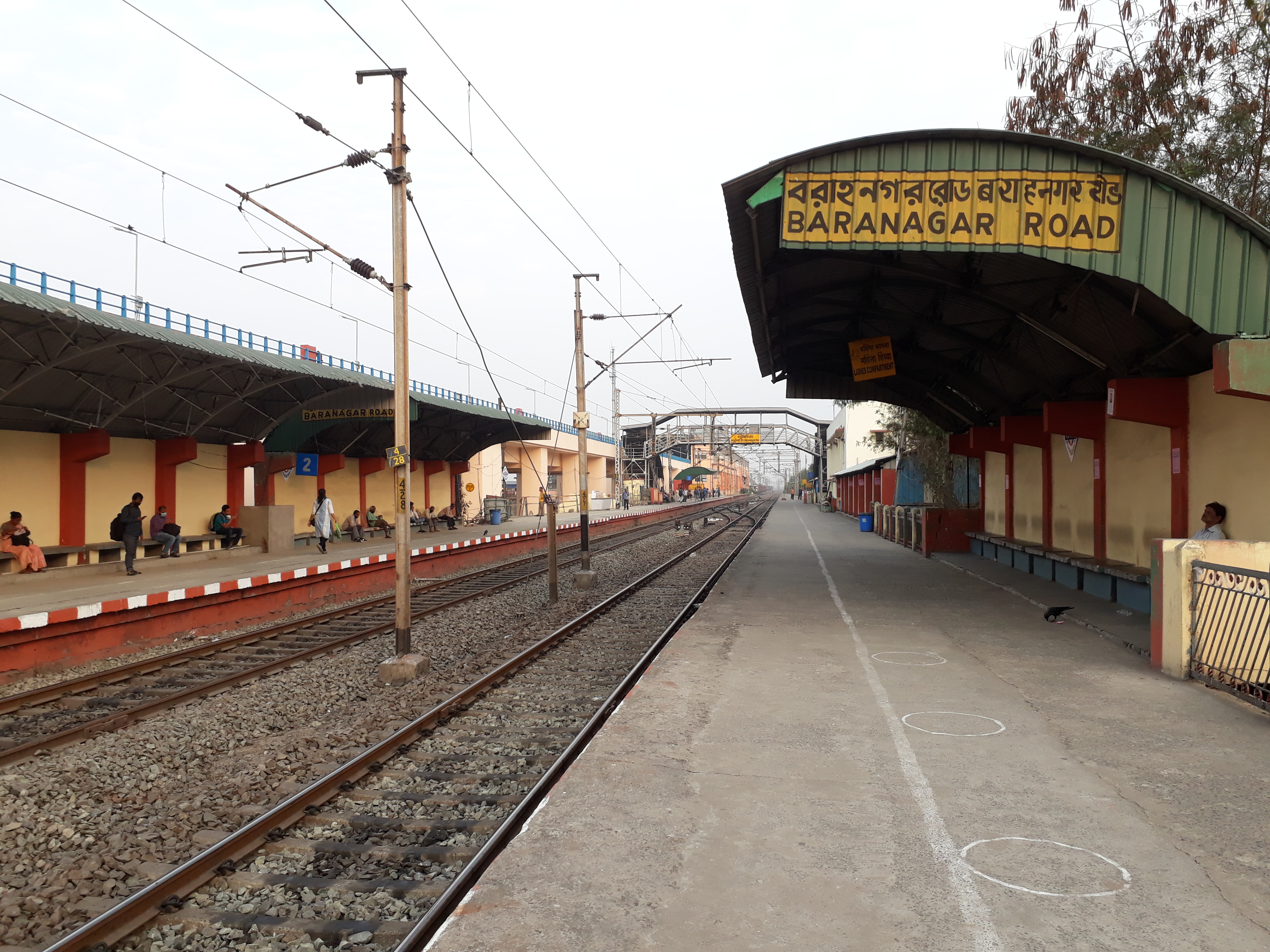
Baranagar Road railway station

Baranagar Road railway stations serves Baranagar. Baranagar Road is one of the oldest railway station. Sealdah - Dankuni line's trains pass through this station. However, trains here are not as frequent as other lines connected to suburbs of Kolkata from Sealdah.

== Education ==
=== University ===
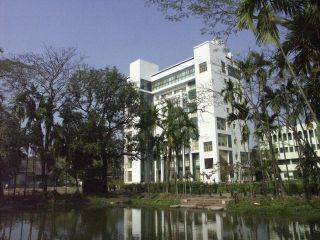
Indian Statistical Institute

Baranagar houses the headquarters of the Indian Statistical Institute at Bonhooghly. It is an academic institute of national importance as recognised by a 1959 act of the Indian parliament. Established in 1931, this public university of India is focused on statistics.

=== Colleges ===
Colleges of Baranagar include:

- Prasanta Chandra Mahalanobis Mahavidyalaya

=== Schools ===
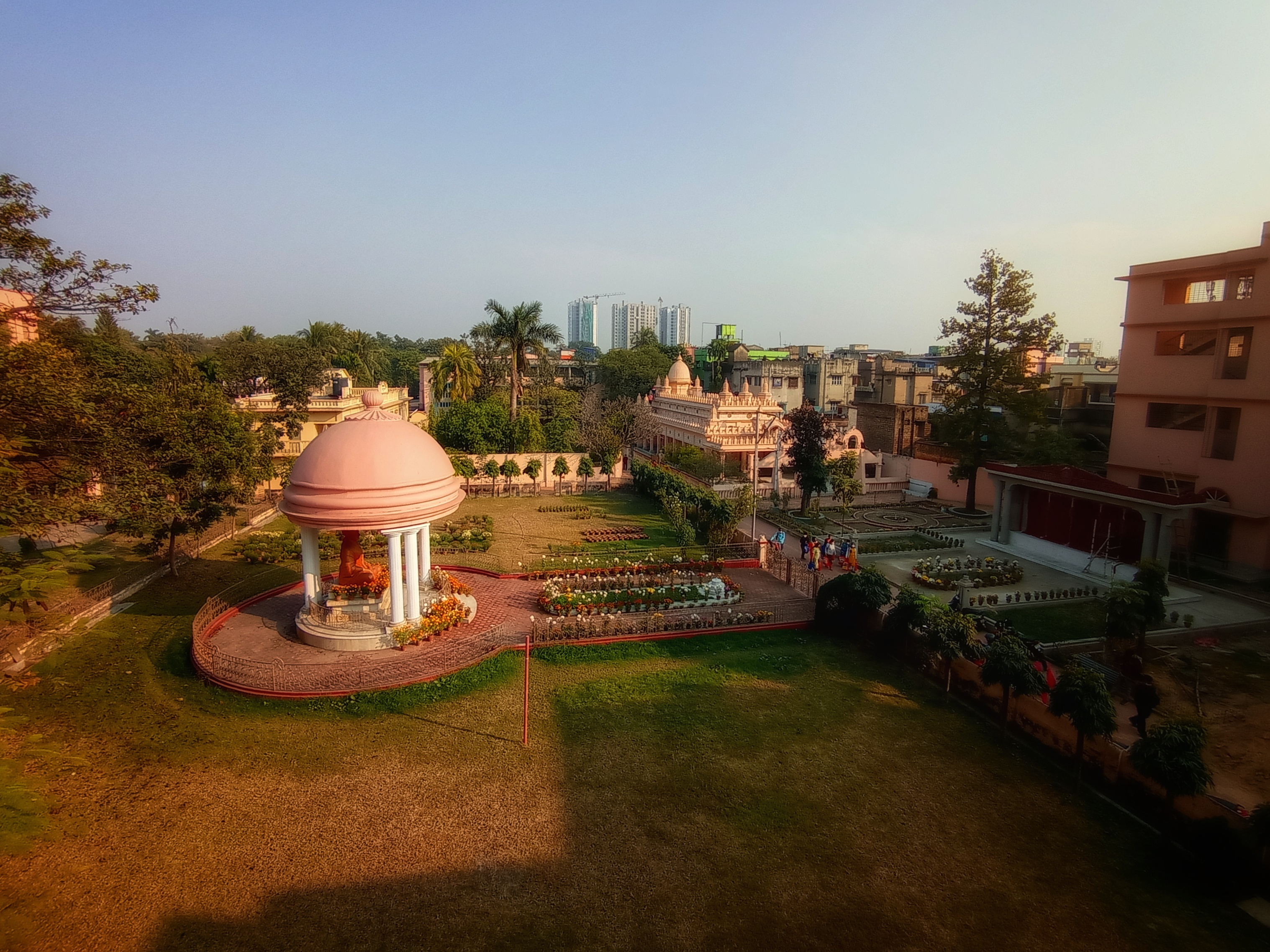
Baranagore Ramakrishna Mission Ashrama High School

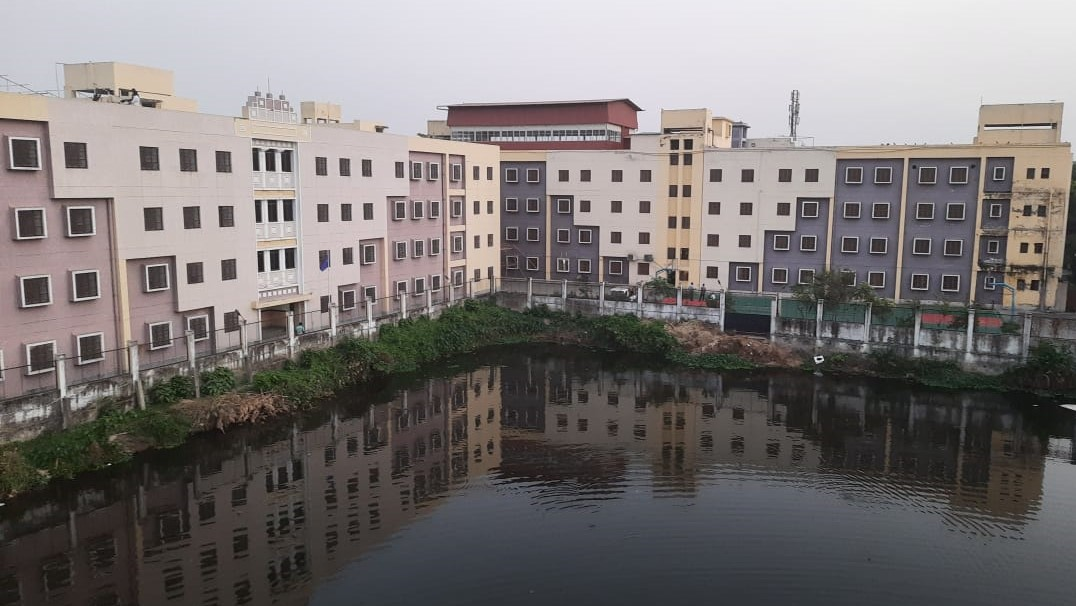
Central Modern School

Baranagar is also home to many schools providing quality education to the local and neighbourhood people.

- Baranagore Ramakrishna Mission Ashrama High School (Senior secondary boys' school)
- Central Modern School

== Health facilities ==
Following hospitals are located in Baranagar:

- Baranagar State General Hospital
- Disha Eye Hospital
- National Institute for Locomotor Disability (NILD)
- Baine Hospital
- Baranagar Matri Sadan
- Indian Institute of Psychometry (IIP)
- Eskag Sanjeevani Multispeciality Hospital

== Tourist attractions ==
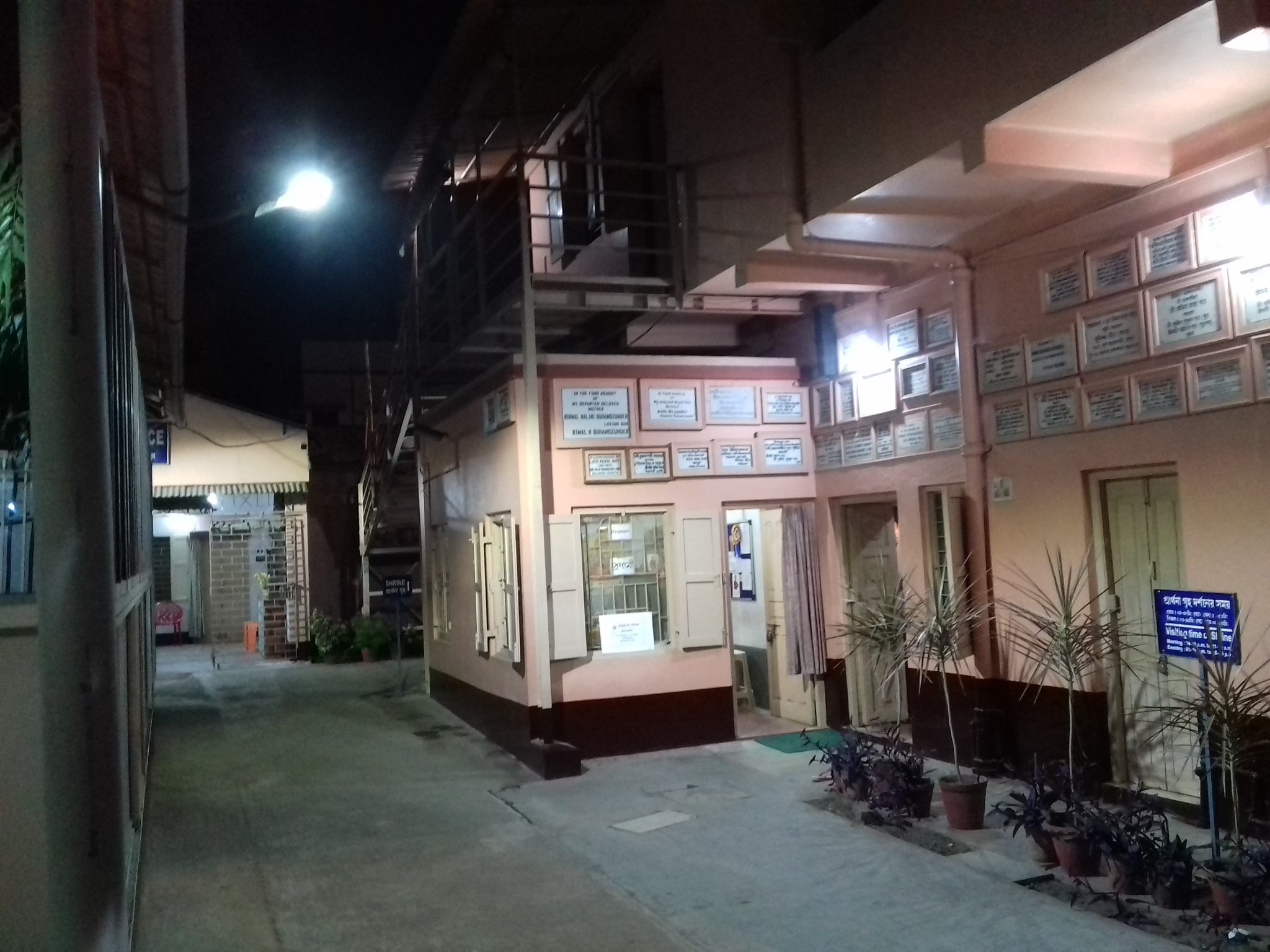
Baranagar Math

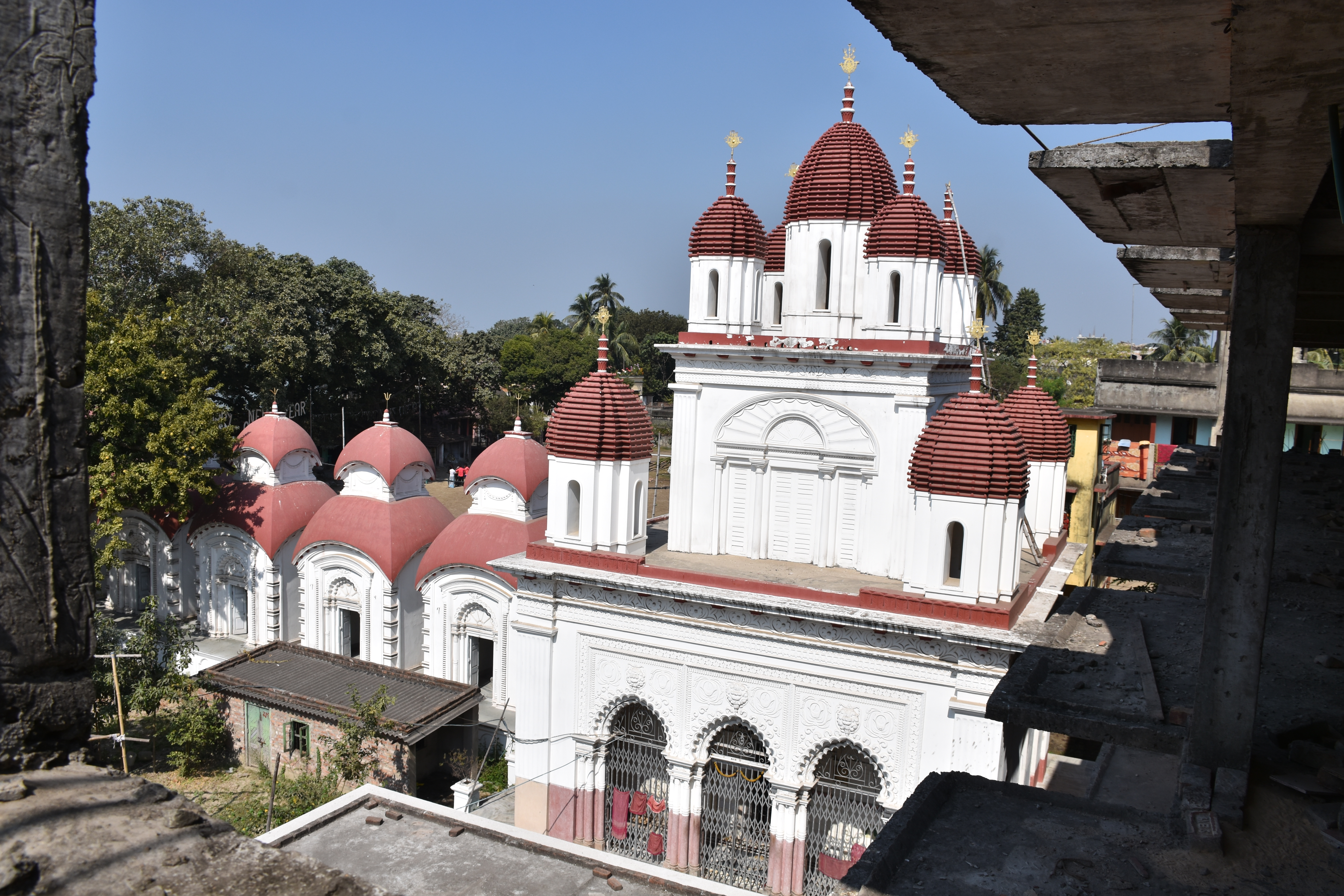
Kripamayee Kali Temple

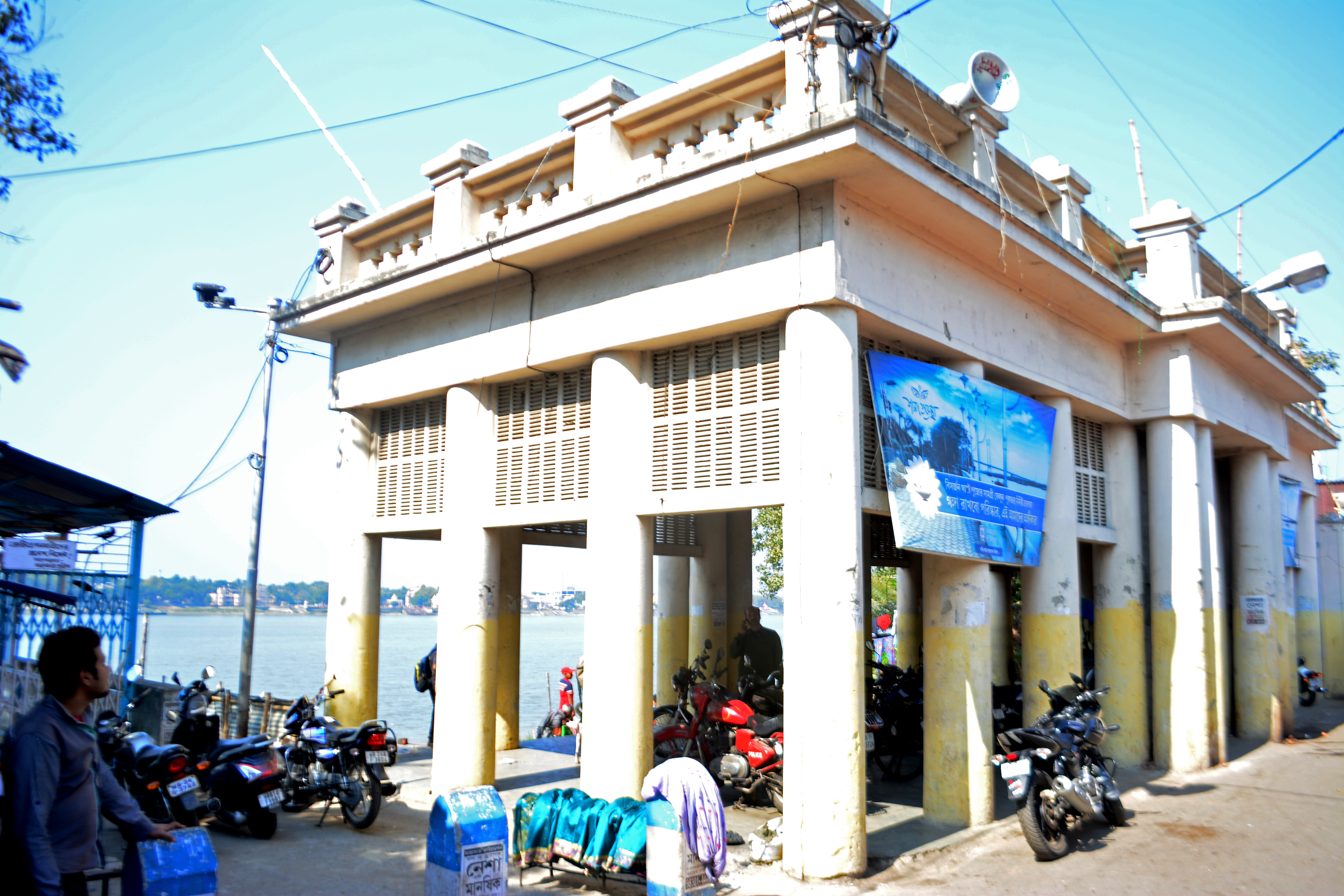
Kuthi Ghat

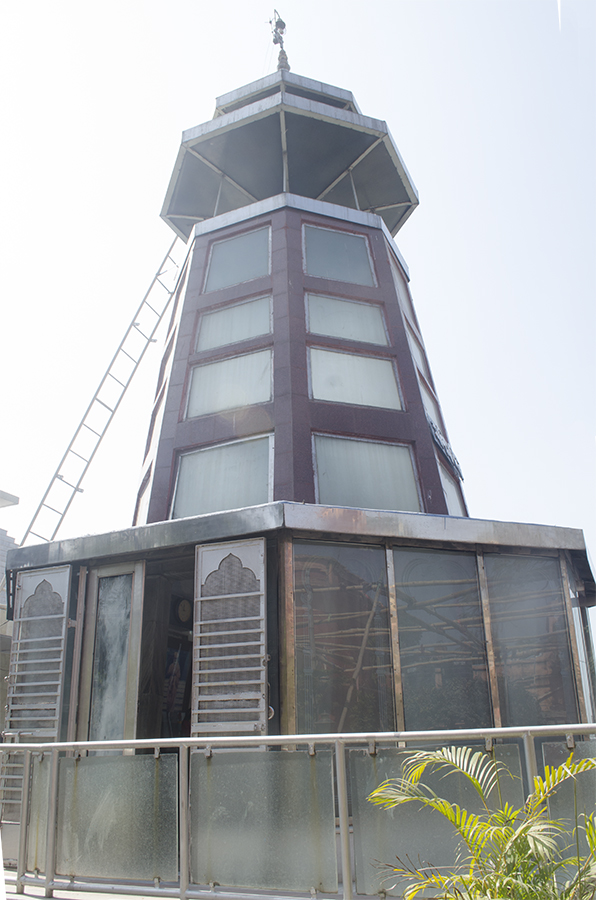
Glass Temple

Several educational institutions, religious places, pilgrims, heritage buildings, places of Baranagar are tourist attractions of many people.

- Baranagore Ramakrishna Mission Ashrama High School
- Indian Statistical Institute
- Baranagar Math
- Alambazar Math
- Kripamayee Kali Temple
- Shree Shyam Mandir Alambazar
- Pathbari Temple
- Mahamilan Math (Omkarnath Math)
- St. James' Church, Baranagar
- Dunlop Gurudwara
- Glass Temple (Kancher Mandir)
- Kuthi Ghat
- Nigerian Kuthi

Besides these, many people come in Baranagar every year in Durga Puja period, in the time of "Ajanta Circus".

== Markets ==
Major markets in the Baranagar area include:

- Baranagar Bazar
- Sinthee Bazar
- Banga Lakshmi Bazar
- Gokul Babur Bazar
- Bonorini Market
- Alambazar Market
- RIC Bazar
- Dunlop Market

== Culture ==
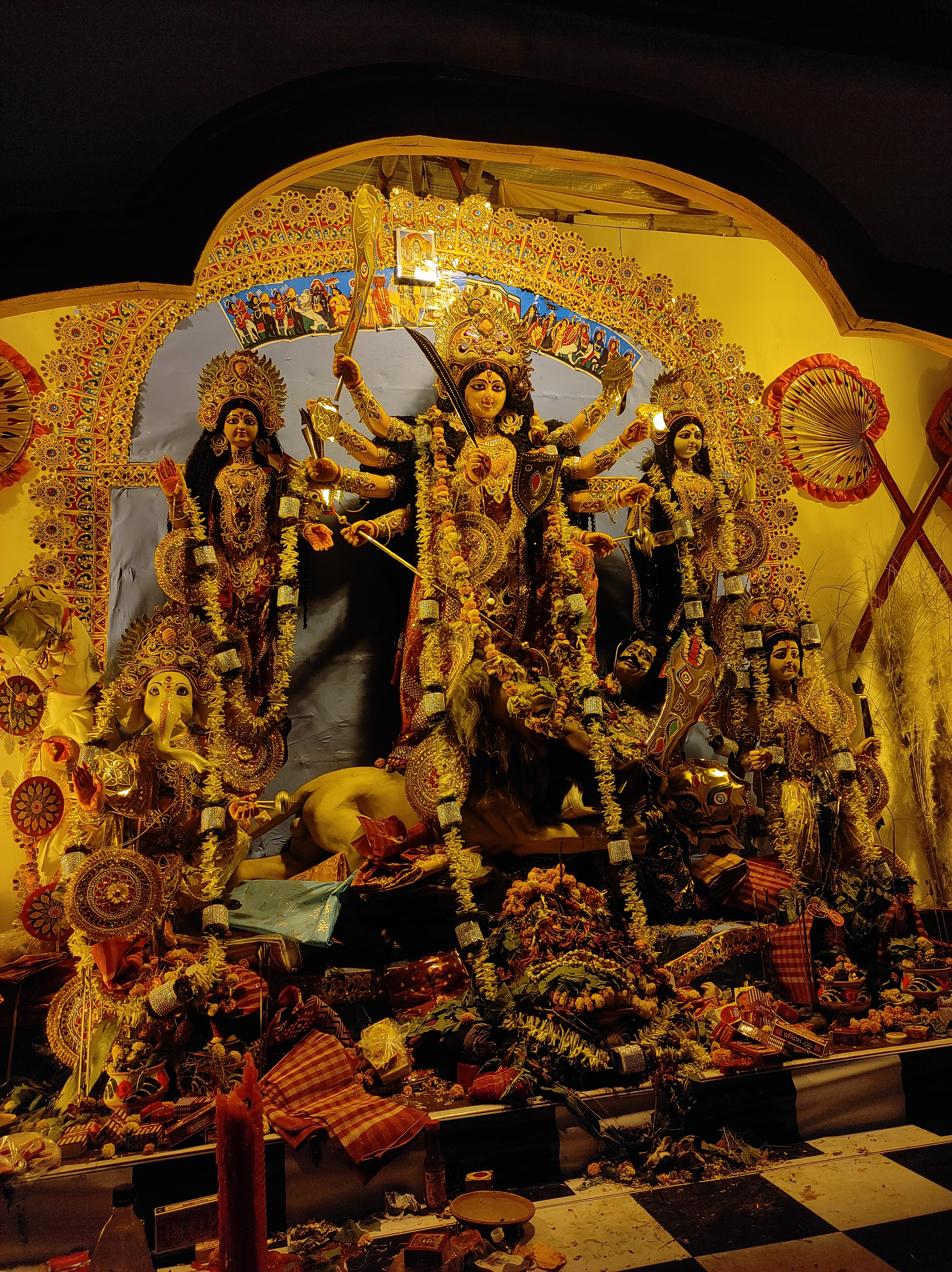
Durga Puja at Baranagar in 2024

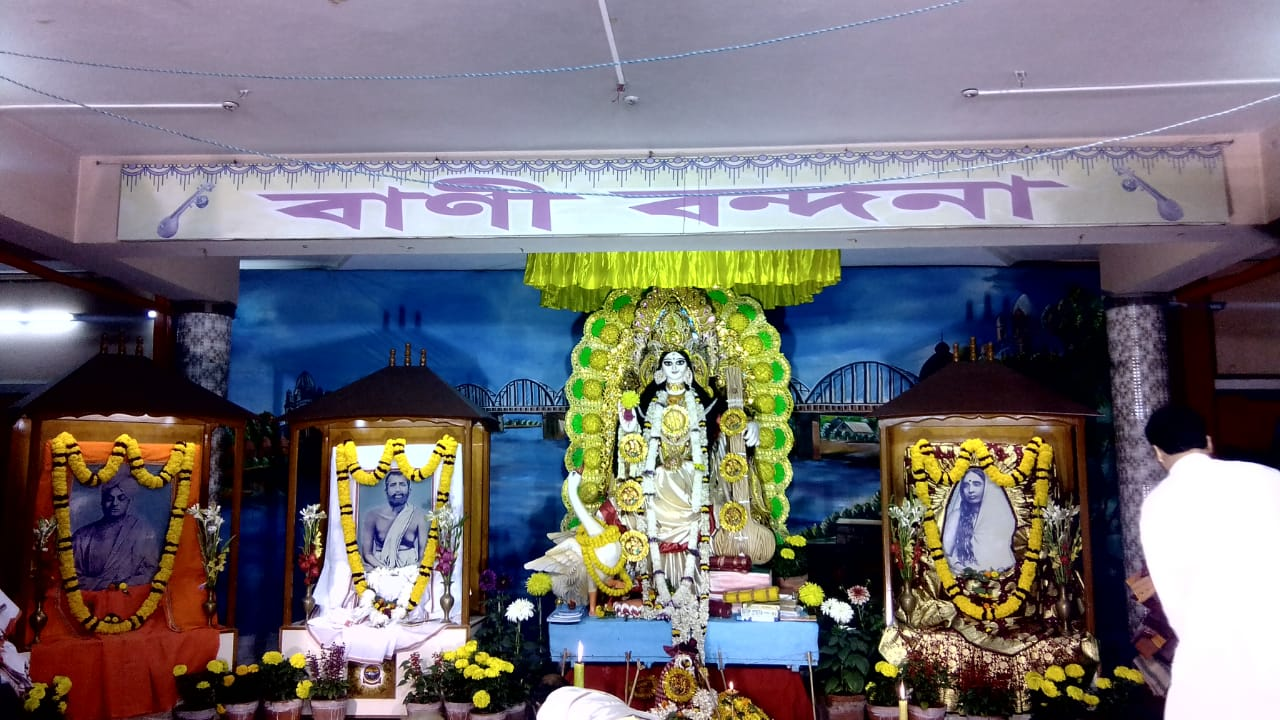
Saraswati Puja at Baranagar Ramakrishna Mission in 2019

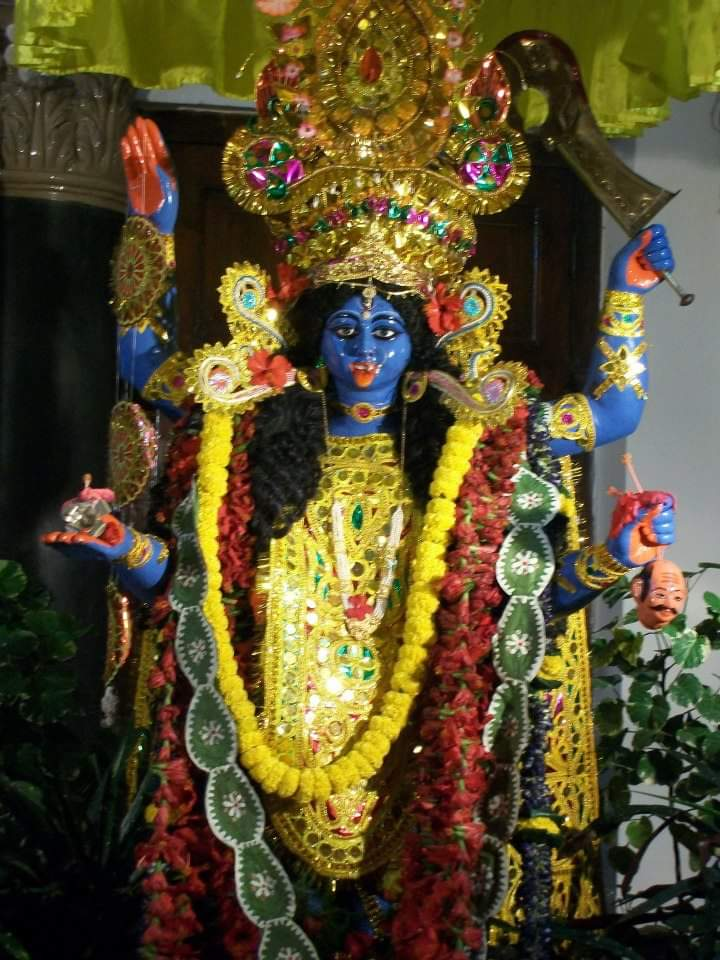
Kali Puja at Baranagar Ramkrishna Mission in 2013

Baranagar Math near Pramanick ghat is the place where Swami Vivekananda and a few other disciples of Sri Ramakrishna Dev started their spiritual journey that culminated in forming the monastic order later located at Belur Math, the present headquarters of Ramakrishna Mission. Other places worth visiting are Jay Mitra Kalibari, Pramanick Kalibari, and Kouleswar Mandir. Pathbari Mandir is a place where Chaitanya Mahaprabhu, the great religious leader, set his foot on his way to Puri nearly five hundred years ago here. In Baranagar a math has been set up very recently, called Alambazar Math in the heritage building where Swami Vivekananda first put up after coming back from abroad. The Annapurna Temple and the newly built Omkarnath Temple are also other two attractions of the "Mahamilan Math". Trailanga Swami Math is also here in Baranagar at Vidyayatan Sarani. There is also an old kalibari in Baranagar Bazar and one in Kutighat and Pramanicghat.

Baranagar has a gurdwara named "Dunlop Gurudwara" near Dunlop Bridge, a church named "St. James' Church, Baranagar" near Sinthee More along with many mosques.

Baranagar is famous for Durga Puja. Popular Durga Puja organizations like Netaji Colony Lowland, Bandhudal Sporting club, Noapara Dadabhai Sangha, Mondal Para Sporting Club, Karmi Sangha, Kalakar para, Ashokgarh Sarbojanin, Nainan Bandhav Samiti, Mullick Colony, Shibmandir maath, Satin sen Sangsad, Friend's association, Rabindranagar Yubak brinda - all lie in Baranagar. In 2022, The first ever silicon based durga idol was displayed at Baranagar's Noapara Dada Bhai Sangha. The same club later made a single tree route carved idol in 2023. In 2024, Bandhudal Sporting Club made one of the largest pandal of Kolkata in the respective year. In every winter, a circus is organised at 'Sinthi Circus Maidan' named "Ajanta Circus". Annual fairs- textile and handloom fair in March–April season and Durga Puja Sharadiya fair in September–October season in Sinthi More Circus and mela ground.

Jhulanbari in Jhulantala and Pathbari are famous for celebrating the festival of Jhulan Jatra and Rash Jatra.

Baranagar also hosts some of the biggest Kali Pujas. Haowa Shokal, Bonhoogly Yubak Sangha, Kalpataru Seva Samiti, Pally Shanti Sangha, Kalitala Maath, Alambazar Naba Jyoti Sangha and Baranagar Boro Ma are among the popular ones. The annual Saraswati Puja is also widely celebrated in the area.

Christmas celebrations at the Baranagar St. James Church also attracts thousands of visitors.

Kalpataru Utsav held on the New Year's Day, the day on which Sri Ramkrishna Became Kalpataru and fulfilled the wishes of his disciples, also attracts thousands of devotees to Baranagar. Devotees visit the famous Baranagar Math and Ramkrishna Maha Smashan in Baranagar and also the nearby Cossipore Udyanbati and Dakshineshwar Temple.

Recently in 2020,Governor of Bengal Shri Jagdeep Dhankhar visited Shree Shyam Mandir Alambazar located at 113,Surya Sen Road,Alambazar,Ashokgarh,Kolkata,West Bengal during the Temple's inaugration ceremony .He visited Shree Shyam Mandir Alambazar again in March 2021 during the Falgun Mela .

== Sports ==
Baranagar is the birthplace of famous sportspersons who have participated in Olympic Games e.g., archer Dola Banerjee, Rahul Banerjee, Atanu Das.

Many sport academies and sporting clubs are situated in Baranagar:

- Bandhudal Sporting Club
- Calcutta Archery Club
- Baranagar Archery Club
- Baranagar Sporting Club
- Baranagar Narayani Sporting Club
- Baranagar Agragami Sporting Club
- Mondal Para Sporting Club

== See also ==
- North Kolkata
- Cossipore
- Dakshineswar
- South Dum Dum
