= Baranagar Municipality =

Municipality in West Bengal, India

- Coat of Arms

Type
- Type: Municipality

History
- Founded: 1869; 157 years ago
- Preceded by: North Suburban Municipality

Leadership
- Chairman: Aparna Moulik (AITC)
- Vice Chairman: Dilip Narayan Bose (AITC)

Structure
- Seats: 34
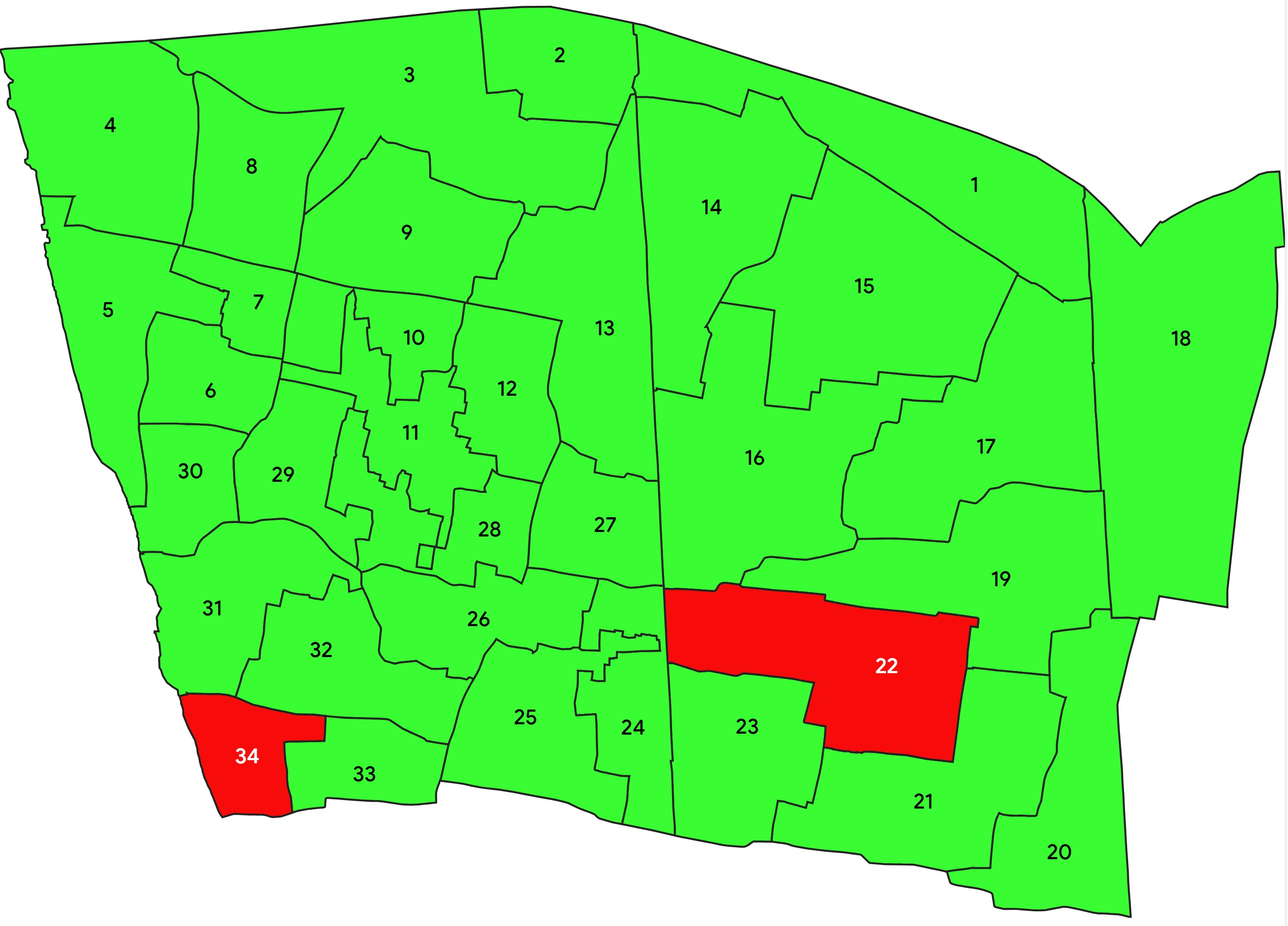
- Political groups: Government (32) AITC 32 Opposition (2) CPI(M) 2

Elections
- Last election: 2022
- Next election: TBD

Meeting place
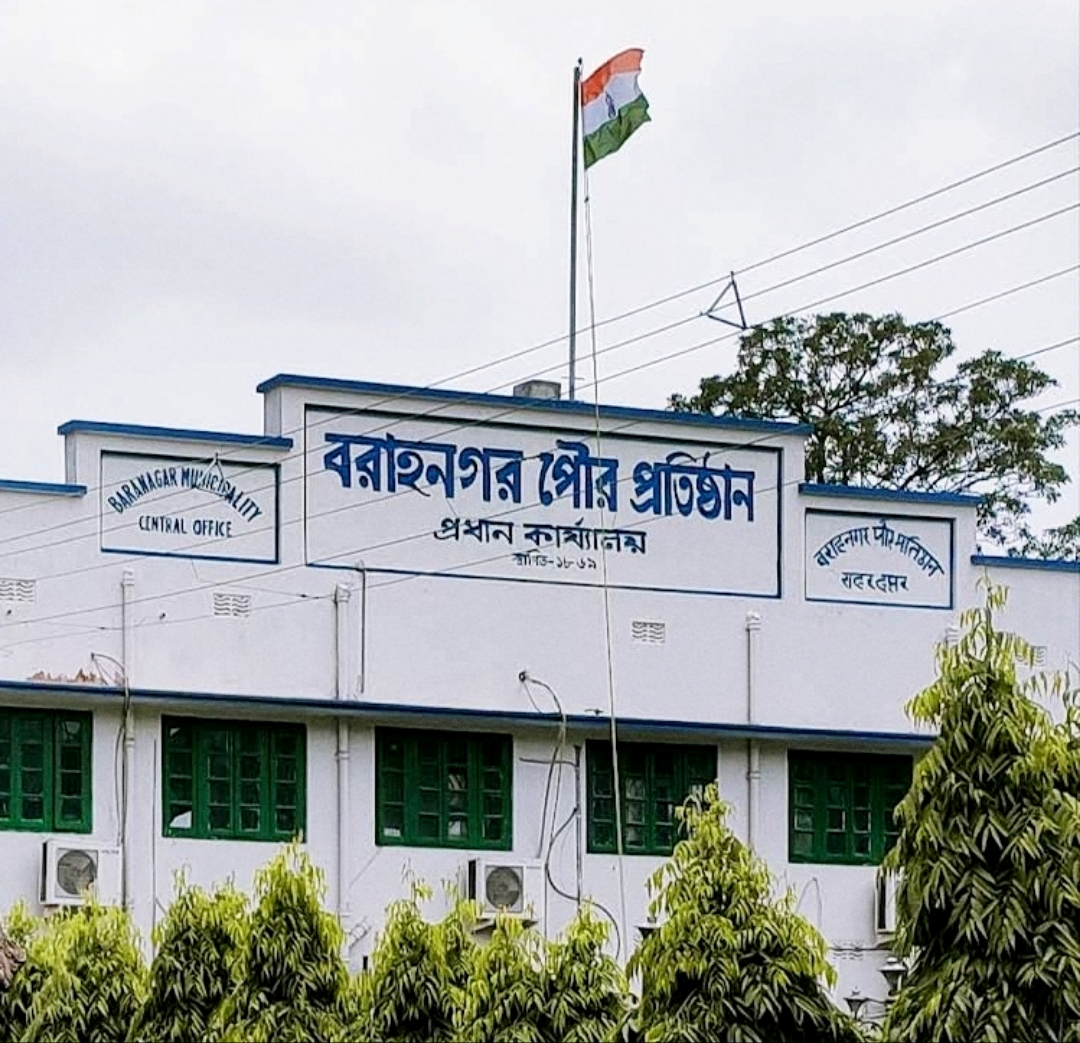
- Baranagar Municipality Headquarters

Website
- www.baranagarmunicipality.org

Baranagar Municipality is the civic body that governs Baranagar areas (Alambazar, Bonhooghly, Noapara and Dunlop) in the Barrackpore subdivision of North 24 Parganas district in West Bengal, India.

== History ==
Baranagar, an ancient region of artisan people, is situated adjacent to Kolkata Municipal Corporation (KMC). The place is situated on the bank of the river Hooghly. Portuguese colonies at first established their business camp here which was in existence till 1862. Portuguese settlement became the seat of a Dutch trading station and an important anchorage for Dutch shipping. The Dutch had homes here in the seventeenth century. There was a hog factory where about 3,000 hogs a year were slaughtered and salted for export. Later it became the centre for the extensive jute trade, manufacturing gunny bags. In 1795, it was ceded to the British. Constituted as the Municipality of "North Suburban" in 1869, the Municipality was renamed "Baranagar" in 1889.

== Healthcare ==
Baranagar Municipality has two hospitals named "Baranagar Matri Sadan" for women and "Eskag Sanjeevani Multispeciality Hospital". There is also a government hospital named "Baranagar State General Hospital" in Baranagar.

== Elections ==
Baranagar Municipality has 34 wards.

=== 2022 West Bengal Municipality election ===
32	2
AITC	CPI(M)

Party	AITC	CPI(M)
Seats
Seats	32 / 34	2 / 34

In the 2022 municipal elections for Baranagar Municipality, AITC won 32 seats, and CPI(M) 2 seats.

=== 2015 West Bengal Municipality election ===
32	2
AITC	CPI(M)

Party	AITC	CPI(M)
Seats
Seats	32 / 34	2 / 34

In the 2015 municipal elections for Baranagar Municipality, AITC won 32 seats, and CPI(M) 2 seats.

=== 2010 West Bengal Municipality election ===
20	11	2	1
AITC	CPI(M)	INC	CPI

Party	AITC	CPI(M)	INC	CPI
Seats
Seats	20 / 34	11 / 34	2 / 34	1 / 34

In the 2010 municipal elections for Baranagar Municipality, AITC won 20 seats, CPI(M) 11 seats, INC 2 seats, and CPI 1 seat.

== List of Councillors (2022 - Present) ==
Following is the list of councillors of Baranagar Municipality at present:

Ward No.	Name of Councillor	Party
1	Usha Bera	AITC
2	Sagarika Banerjee	AITC
3	Sudhangshu Awon	AITC
4	Pritha Mukherjee	AITC
5	Arif Hussain	AITC
6	Puspa Roy	AITC
7	Nilu Gupta	AITC
8	Gour Jana	AITC
9	Ramkrishna Paul	AITC
10	Titli Patra Majumdar	AITC
11	Ashoke De	AITC
12	Sanchita Dey	AITC
13	Dalia Mukherjee	AITC
14	Santanu Majumder	AITC
15	Aparna Moulik	AITC
16	Sampa Chandra	AITC
17	Anjan Paul	AITC
18	Sunath Biswas	AITC
19	Sampa Kundu	AITC
20	Netai Saha	AITC
21	Dilip Narayan Bose	AITC
22	Swati Das	CPI(M)
23	Subiman Ghosh	AITC
24	Ashim Kumar Ganguly	AITC
25	Susmita Chatterjee	AITC
26	Alpana Naha	AITC
27	Biswajit Bardhan	AITC
28	Ruma Dutta	AITC
29	Anindya Chaudhuri	AITC
30	Jayanta Roy	AITC
31	Nivedita Basak	AITC
32	Sumitra Biswas	AITC
33	Amar Paul	AITC
34	Sisir Bhattacharya	CPI(M)

== See also ==
- List of municipal corporations in India
