= Kripamayee Kali Temple =

Hindu temple in Baranagar, India

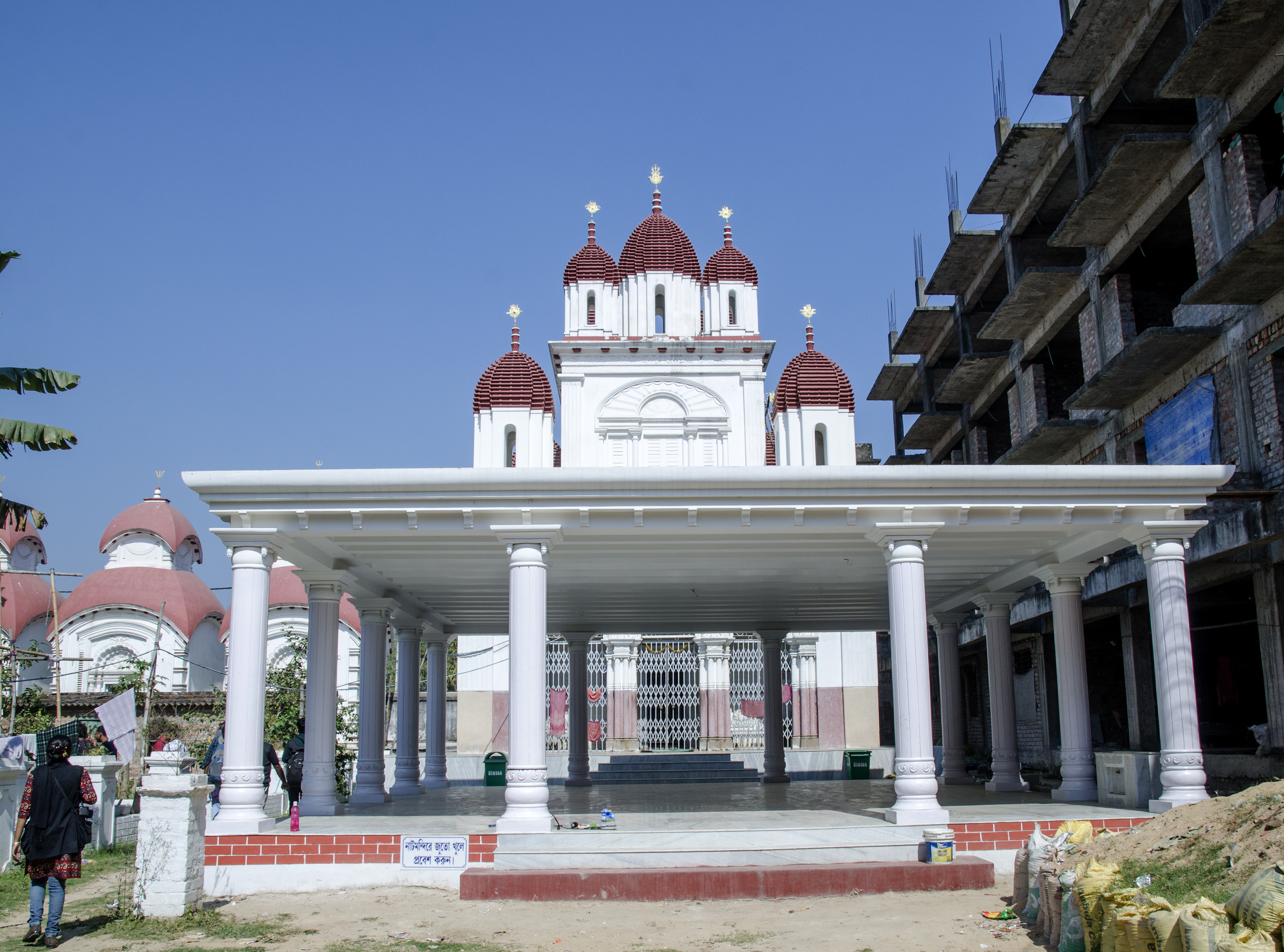

- Location in West Bengal

Religion
- Affiliation: Hinduism
- District: North 24 Parganas
- Deity: Kali

Location
- Location: Baranagar
- State: West Bengal
- Country: India
- Coordinates: 22°39′18″N 88°21′28″E

Architecture
- Type: Bengali architecture
- Creator: Jai Narayan Mitter
- Completed: 1848

Kripamayee Kali Temple Kripamôyee Kali Môndir), commonly known as Joy Mitra Kalibari, Jôy Mitrô Kalibari ), is a Hindu temple dedicated to goddess Kali, located on the eastern banks of Hooghly River at Baranagar in Kolkata, in the Indian state of West Bengal.

== History ==
The temple was built in 1848 by Jai Narayan Mitra, a famous zamindar and a devotee of Kali. Mitra bought 3 bighas plot from one Mr. James and founded the temple. The presiding deity of the temple is Kripamayee ("She who is merciful"), a form of Kali. It is a colossal nabaratna (nine-spired) temple with twelve shrines dedicated to Shiva, Kali's consort.
