= Alambazar =

- Neighbourhood
- Location in Kolkata Alambazar (West Bengal) Alambazar (India)
- Coordinates: 22.6495°N 88.3634°E
- Country: India
- State: West Bengal
- District: North 24 Parganas
- Metro Station: Baranagar; Dakshineswar

Government
  - Type: Municipality
  - Body: Baranagar Municipality

Languages
  - Official: Bengali, English
- Time zone: UTC+5:30 (IST)
- PIN: 700035
- Telephone code: +91 33
- Lok Sabha constituency: Dum Dum
- Vidhan Sabha constituency: Baranagar

Alambazar is a locality in Baranagar of North 24 Parganas district in the Indian state of West Bengal. It is a part of the area covered by Kolkata Metropolitan Development Authority (KMDA).
