= Sarat Chandra Chakravarty =

- শরৎ চন্দ্র চক্রবর্ত্তি
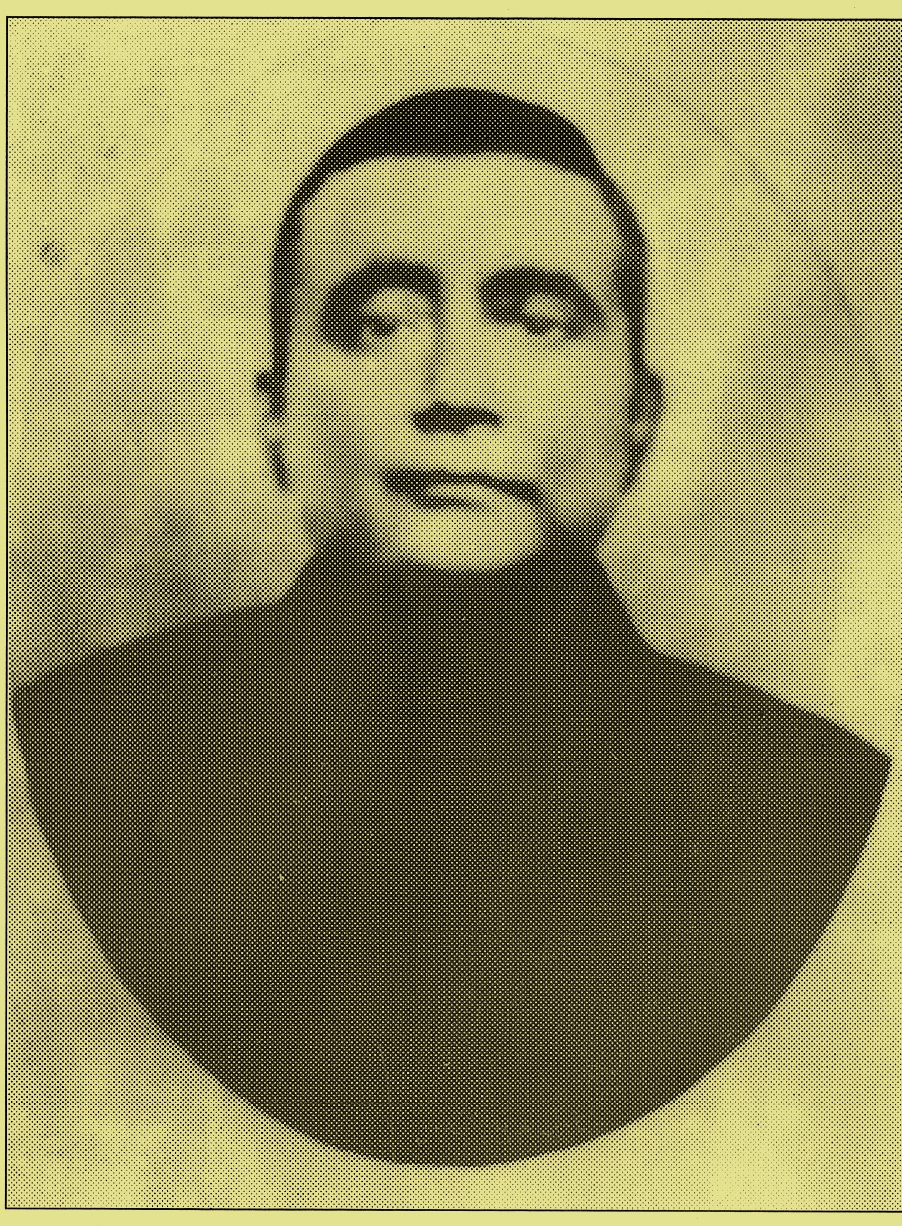
- Born: 21 February 1868; Kotapada Village, Faridpur District, Bengal Presidency, British India ( Now in Bangladesh
- Died: 23 August 1944 (aged 76); Berhampore/Baharampur, Bengal Presidency, British India (now in West Bengal, India)
- Citizenship: India
- Occupations: Post Master, scholar
- Known for: Vedanta

Sarat Chandra Chakravarty (Bengali: শরৎ চন্দ্র চক্রবর্ত্তি) was a direct householder disciple of Swami Vivekananda and was the chronicler of "Diary of a Disciple" (Bengali: স্বামী শিষ্য সংবাদ) which is one of the major sources of first-hand information on Vivekananda's biography and teachings in the later stage of his life. Sarat Chandra was intimately connected with the Ramakrishna Order throughout his life, and even before the return of Swami Vivekananda from the West in 1897 he had been associated with the old monastery in Alambazar and with the direct disciples of Sri Ramakrishna. He was also a Sanskrit scholar and was a Post master by profession in the British Government service.

== Early life ==
Sarat Chandra was born to Ramkamal Chakravarty and Vidhumukhi Devi in the village Kotapada in the district Faridpur in erstwhile Bengal province (now Bangladesh) on the Hindu holy day of Sivaratri on 21 February 1868. The parents were humble but pious and educated. Sarat Chandra was the eldest son of the family. His mother was well versed in scripture, and from his parents he got his interest in spirituality. He grew up as an orthodox Brahmin owing to the prevalent customs of the society. He was known to be kind and of charitable disposition at an early age.

=== Education ===
In 1873, he passed school final examination. He loved Sanskrit most. In 1882, he passed entrance examination and earned a scholarship of Rs 10/-. He joined Jagannath College in Dhaka. His penned his first poem about this time, called Kavya Kusumanjali, in 1882–83. He passed First Arts (F.A) in 1883 and joined Metropolitan Institution run by Iswar Chandra Vidyasagar in Calcutta. Mahendranath Gupta, better known as "M", the author of The Gospel of Sri Ramakrishna was a teacher in this institute. However, there is no recorded history as to whether Sarat Chandra met "M" or any of the students of "M" who later became the direct disciples of Sri Ramakrishna, at this time. He passed Bachelor of Arts (B.A) with honours in Sanskrit. He was the first graduate from his village.

=== Marriage and career ===
Sarat Chandra, according to the prevalent norms and culture, was married to Mokshadayini, at an early age, and had a son and three daughters from the marriage. In order to support his family, he, side by side along with his pursuing of his education, became a private tutor of a local landlord. He bore the educational expenses of his brother Ramesh Chandra, who was also a brilliant student. Subsequently, after graduation he joined the Government service under the then British rule, as a Deputy Post Master and continued with the same profession for the rest of his life. His biographer states that he was unjustly denied promotion throughout his career by the British officials owing to his uprightness and dignity in not acceding to their whims. He began his career as Deputy Post Master at Barrackpore Post Office, page 24. During his service he had to work in many places in Bengal, Bihar and Orissa.

=== Introduction to Ramakrishna Vivekananda ideology ===
Sarat Chandra came in contact with Durga Charan Nag, also called Nag Mahasaya, a foremost householder disciple of Sri Ramakrishna in the early stage of his career. The latter introduced him to the ideology of Sri Ramakrishna and took him to Dakshineswar temple and to Alambazar Math where he met many direct monastic disciples of Sri Ramakrishna, like Swami Brahmananda, Swami Turiyananda, Swami Ramakrishnananda, Swami Niranjanananda and Swami Premananda. He, being already well versed with Vedanta philosophy, was attracted by the holy life led by the monks, their erudition and their sincere aspiration after realization or direct perception of the Truth. He joined in the celebrations of the birth anniversaries of Sri Ramakrishna by the monks of the monastery and composed a hymn called Sri Ramakrishna Stavamala.

== Swami Vivekananda and his influence ==
Sarat Chandra met Swami Vivekananda in Priyanath Mukherjee's house in Baghbazar three or four days after the Swami set foot on Calcutta on 20 February 1897. Sarat was introduced to the Swami by Swami Turiyananda. Swami Vivekananda conversed with him in Sanskrit on Nag Mahasaya. After that he met Swami Vivekananda many times, initially in the Garden House of Gopal Lal Seal and Alambazar Math, and later in the newly established Belur Math, and became intimate with him who would affectionately call him as "Bangal", an epithet used for people from East Bengal. In May 1897 he was formally initiated by Swami Vivekananda. The Swami discoursed him on many topics of Vedanta. During the initial days of the Belur Math, Sarat Chandra attended many critical functions like the consecration of the Math premises with the urn containing the ashes of Sri Ramakrishna and the birthday celebration of Sri Ramakrishna in 1898. He was also well acquainted with the famous poet, playwright and a disciple of Sri Ramakrishna, Girish Chandra Ghosh. He composed a book of hymns in Sanskrit on Sri Ramakrishna during one of the birthday celebrations. He met Swami Vivekananda for the last time in June 1902, a week before the latter died. During this period he often cooked and discussed on many spiritual topics. Most of the conversations which are of interest to people interested in Vedanta philosophy and its interpretation by Swami Vivekananda, are captured in the Diary of a Disciple. He was also present when Ramakrishna Mission was formally founded in the house of Balaram Bose on 1 May 1897.

== Influence of Nag Mahasaya ==
The person who influenced Sarat Chandra most after Swami Vivekananda was Durga Charan Nag, a saint and a householder disciple of Sri Ramakrishna. Sarat Chandra also wrote the only biography on Nag Mahasaya, called Life of Nag Mahasaya. He was present by the bedside of Nag Mahasaya when the latter died.

== Later years ==
In the course of his service, Sarat had to travel throughout the province of Bengal, and he spread the ideals of Ramakrishna and Vivekananda in the places that he visited. He retired in 1933 from Head Post Office in Cuttack, Orissa. Sarat Chandra composed Sri Ramakrishna Panchali based on the life of Sri Ramakrishna. The revolutionaries of Bengal, most famous among them being Subhas Chandra Bose had read Swami Vivekananda's conversations with his disciple on spiritual matters and drew their inspiration from the book. The bard of Bengal Mukunda Das, a famous poet, ballad singer, patriot and lyricist, was a friend of Sarat Chandra and sang the songs composed by the latter during theatrical performances in the villages.

Sarat also started many devotees' association, study circles, societies in Ramakrishna Vivekananda ideology, wherever he was posted during his service. He maintained close contact with the monks of the Belur Math. Sri Sarada Devi, the spiritual consort of Ramakrishna had stayed in his house in Burdwan. He also established the Ramakrishna Mission Ashrama in Midnapore, Bengal, in the house of the local landlord or Zamindar, during his stay in Midnapore as the chief executive of the Post Office there.

Between 1914 and 1921 many direct disciples of Sri Ramakrishna visited his house. Among them were Golap Ma, Yogin Ma, Swami Subodhananda, Swami Adbhutananda, Swami Saradananda and Gauri Ma.

After retirement in 1933 he spent several years in Calcutta, and he suffered from poor eyesight. He wrote a commentary on Brahma Sutras as he was directed by Swami Vivekananda to do so. The work was edited by Swami Shuddhananda, another direct disciple of Swami Vivekananda. The last four years of his life, from 1939 to 1942 were spent in Baharampur in Murshidabad district of Bengal and also in his native village. Many dignitaries and monks of Ramakrishna Order used to visit his house. His last few years were spent in silent contemplation and devotion to a marble plaque of Sri Ramakrishna presented to him by Swami Vivekananda. In spite of his ailments, he did not miss an opportunity to spread the message of Sri Ramakrishna and Vivekananda whenever he received an invitation to do so on special occasions like birth anniversaries. He suffered from asthma and died on 23 August 1942.

== Bibliography ==
- Banerjee, Chhaya (2013). Sarat Chandra Chakravarty. Chennai: Ramakrishna Math Mylapore. ISBN 9788171208593.
