= Disciples of Ramakrishna =

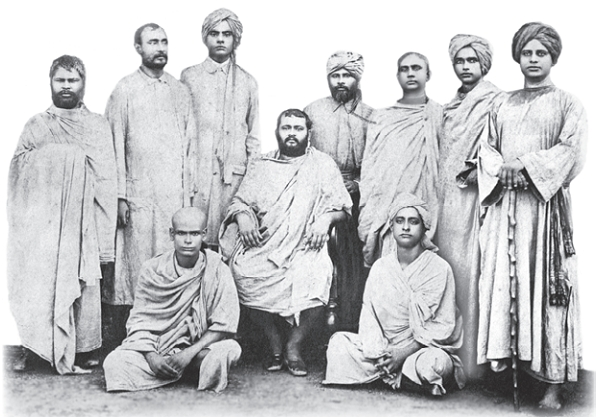
Alambazar Math, 1896 (farewell to Swami Abhedananda leaving for the US) (from left) standing: Swami Adbhutananda, Swami Yogananda, Swami Abhedananda, Swami Trigunatitananda, Swami Turiyananda, Swami Nirmalananda, and Swami Niranjanananda(The Senior); sitting: Swami Subodhananda, Swami Brahmananda (on chair), and Swami Akhandananda

Ramakrishna Paramhansa Deva had sixteen direct disciples (other than Swami Vivekananda) who became monks of the Ramakrishna Order; they are often considered his apostles. In the Ramakrishna-Vivekananda movement, the apostles have played an important role. Apart from Swami Vivekananda, the direct disciples or apostles of Ramakrishna were as follows.

== Monastic disciples ==
=== Swami Vivekananda ===
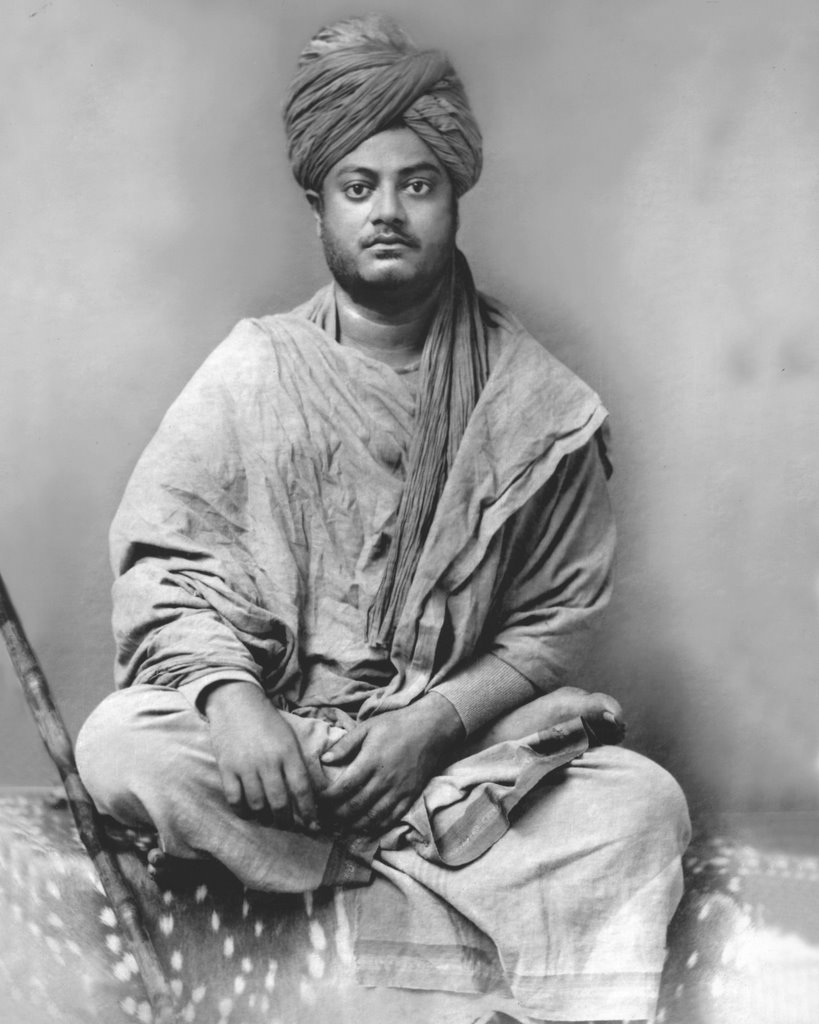
Swami Vivekananda

=== Swami Brahmananda ===
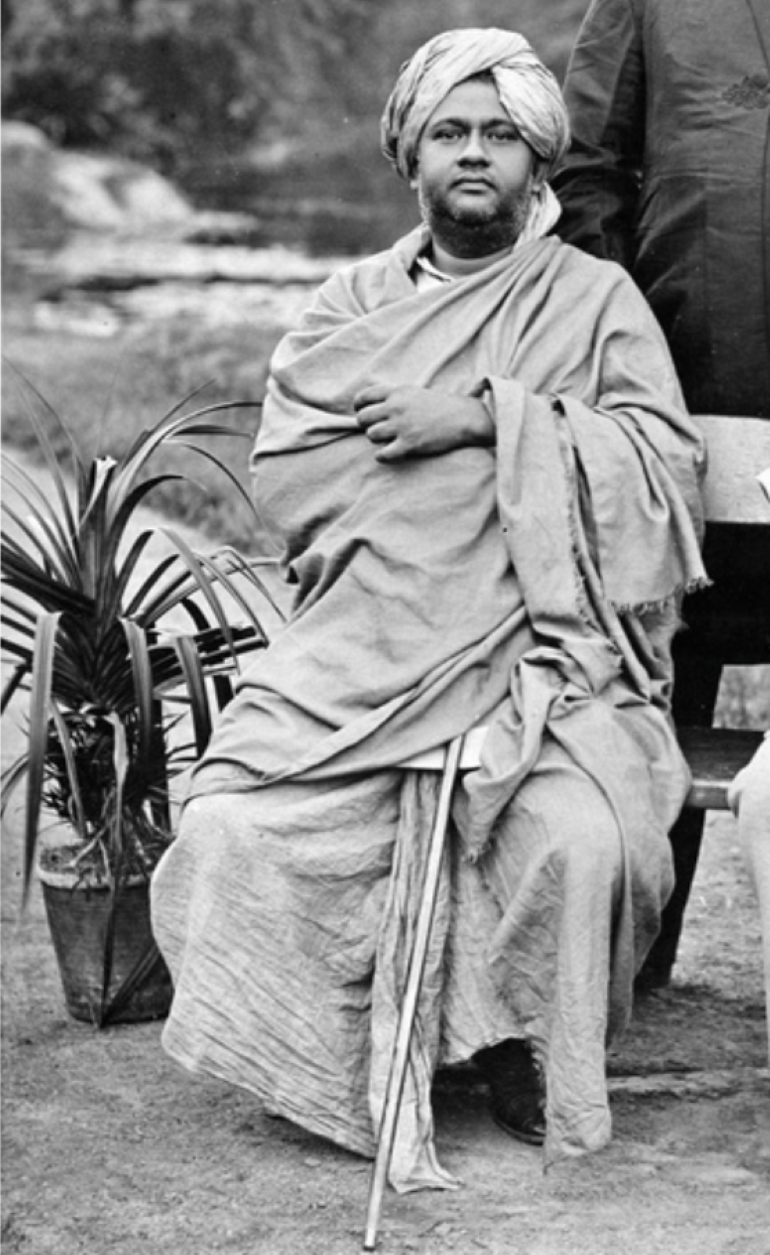
Swami Brahmananda

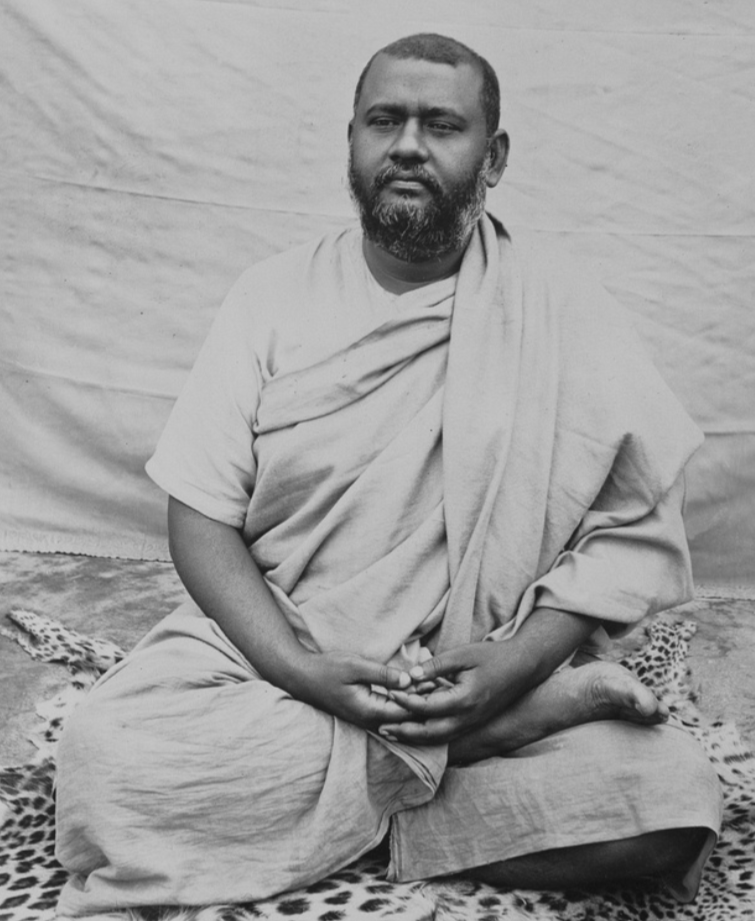
Swami Brahmananda

Swami Brahmananda (1863–1922), whose original name was Rakhal Chandra Ghosh, was son of a zamindar in the Basirhat area. He was born on 21 January 1863 at Sikra Kulingram, 36 miles to the North west of Kolkata. Rakhal was devoted to God and used to practice meditation even in boyhood. At the age of 12 he was brought to Kolkata for his studies.

Before that, the Master (Ramakrishna Paramahamsa) had a vision in which he saw the Divine Mother showing him a child who would be his son. As soon as Rakhal came to Dakshineswar, Sri Ramakrishna Paramahamsa recognised him to be that child, and treated him like a son. After a few visits, Rakhal came to Dakshineswar to live permanently with Sri Ramakrishna. Under the Master's guidance, he practiced intense spiritual disciplines, and attained high levels of spiritual illumination. After the Master died in 1886 when the new Monastic brotherhood was formed at Baranagar, Rakhal joined it. He underwent sannyasa ordination and assumed the name Brahmananda. Two years later he left Baranagar Math and was a wandering monk for some time, living an intensely contemplative life at Varanasi, Omkarnath, Vrindaban, Hardwar and other places. During this period he is said to have scaled the highest peak of non-dualistic experience and used to remain absorbed in Samadhi for days together. In 1890, he returned to the Math. When Swami Vivekananda, who was just nine days older to him, after his return to India in 1897, wanted to give a new turn to monastic life, Swami Brahmananda whole-heartedly supported him. There was deep love between these two monastic brothers.

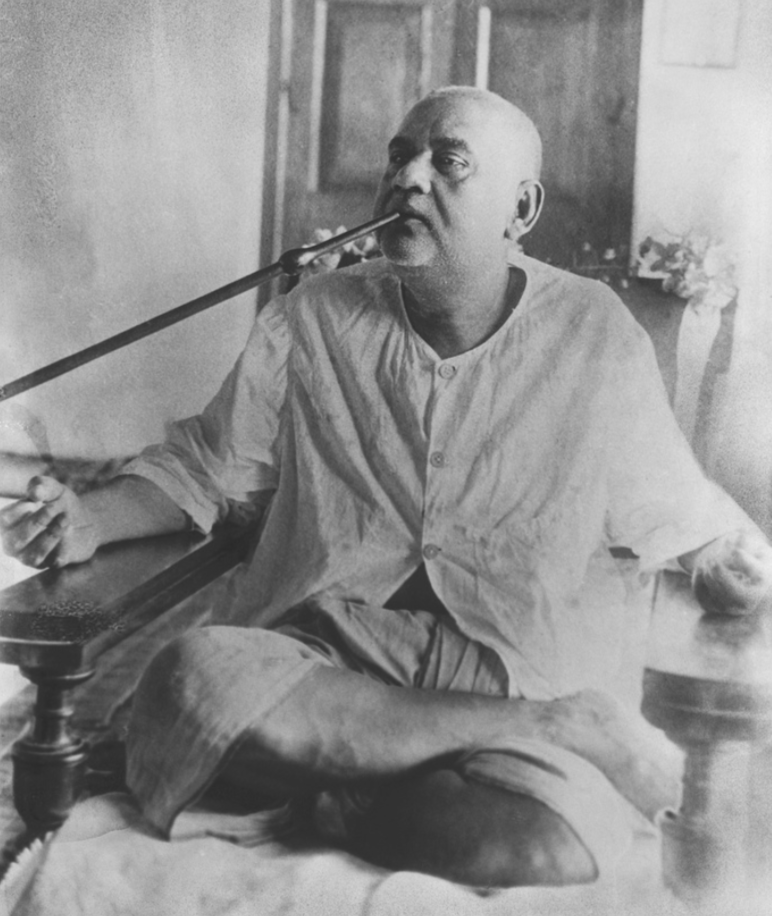
Swami Brahmananda

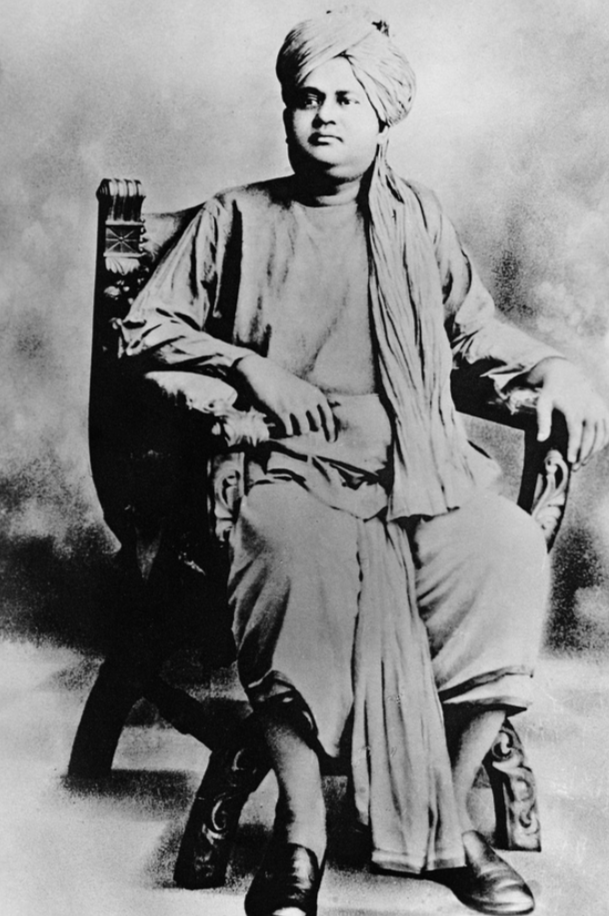
Swami Brahmananda

When Ramakrishna Mission was formed as an Association on 1 May 1897, at Baghbazar in Calcutta (now Kolkata) Swami Vivekananda was elected its General President and Swami Brahmananda was elected the first and only ever Calcutta President. After establishing Belur Math monastery when Swami Vivekananda got Ramakrishna Math registered as a Trust, Swami Brahmananda became its president. He held this post till the end of his life.

During his tenure as president, the Ramakrishna Order underwent great expansion, and several new branch centres were opened in India and abroad. The Ramakrishna Mission, which had been founded by Swami Vivekananda as an Association, was revived and registered during his time. His stress on contemplative life served to counterbalance the activities undertaken by the monks. During those difficult formative years, he gave great stability to the Sangha. For his kingly qualities of administration, Swami Vivekananda gave him the appellation ‘Raja’, and since then he was respectfully referred to as ‘Raja Maharaj’ by all. He was one of the six disciples of Sri Ramakrishna whom the Master regarded as Ishvarakotis.

He spent a good portion of his lifetime at Puri and Bhubaneswar. He was main instrument responsible for setting up of Ramakrishna Ashramas at Puri and Bhubaneswar.

He gave up his body, after a brief illness, on 10 April 1922. At the place where his body was cremated in Belur Math, a temple now stands in his memory.

Source: The Eternal Companion: Teachings of Swami Brahmananda by Swami Yatiswarananda and Swami Prabhavananda God Lived with Them by Swami Chetanananda

=== Swami Turiyananda ===
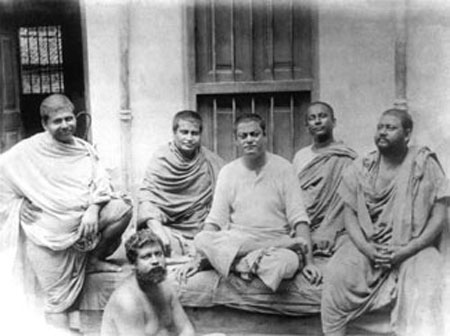
Some Monastic Disciples (L to R): Trigunatitananda, Shivananda, Vivekananda, Turiyananda, Brahmananda. Below Saradananda, 1899

Swami Turiyananda (1863–1922), whose original name was Harinath Chattopadhyay, was born on 3 January 1863 at North Calcutta (Now Kolkata) in a well known family. Hari lost his parents in boyhood and grew up under the care of his eldest brother. After passing the school final examination, he did not go to college. Instead, he devoted his time to meditation and the study of Sankara's Advaita Vedanta. When he was about 17 years old he visited Sri Ramakrishna at Dakshineswar for the first time in the ancestral home of Kalinath Bose in Baghbazar, and after that he started going to the Master frequently. The Master regarded him as a yogi. Hari was a member of the team of youngsters who served Sri Ramakrishna during his last illness at Cossipore. After the Master's death, Hari joined Baranagar Math and underwent sannyasa ordination, assuming the name Turiyananda. After three years he left the monastery and spent his time doing tapasya at different places, sometimes alone, sometimes in the company of his brother monks. When Swami Vivekananda went to the West for the second time, he took Swami Turiyananda with him. When Swamiji went back to India, Turiyananda continued his work, first in New York and Boston and later in California. However, his health deteriorated, and he left America in June 1902. On his arrival in India, he was shocked to hear of the death of Swami Vivekananda. Turiyananda spent the next several years practicing intense contemplation in Vrindavan, in different places in the Himalayas, in Dehra Dun, Kankhal, Almora, etc. He finally settled down in Varanasi in February 1919. During the last few years he suffered much from diabetes. He died on 21 July 1922 at Varanasi. Moments before dying he repeated the Upanishadic mantra 'Satyam, Jnanam Anantham Brahma' meaning 'God is Truth, Wisdom and Infinity' along with his brother disciple Swami Akhandananda after which he was heard muttering in Bengali 'Brahma Satya, Jagat Satya; Sab Satya. Satye Pran Pratishtitha' which means `God is Truth, the World is also Truth, Everything is Truth. Life is based on Truth'. This was radically different from the orthodox 'Brahma Satyam Jagad Mithya' meaning God is Truth and the World is false. These unorthodox last words, which were spoken impromptu, has generally been taken as the vision seen by an illumined sage who sees God everywhere.

=== Swami Abhedananda ===
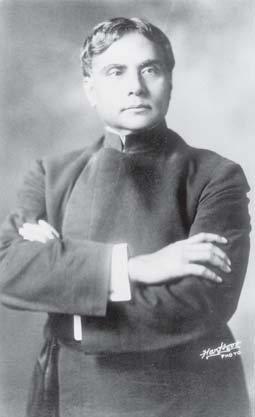
Swami Abhedananda, c. 1910

=== Swami Atmadhar Paramahansa ===
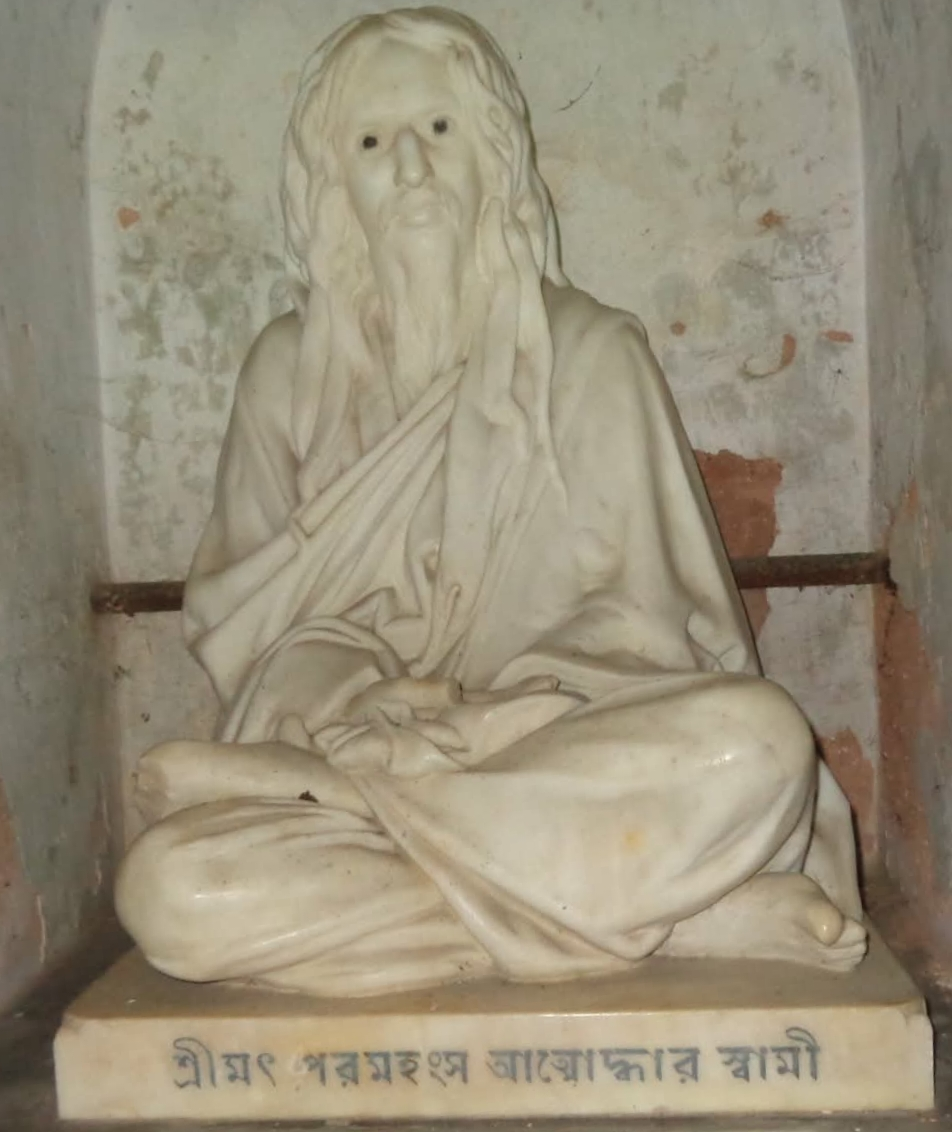
Swami Atmadhar, idol at Jalsin Elokeshi High School, Nannar

=== Swami Adbhutananda ===
Adbhutananda (died 1920), born Rakhturam, was a direct monastic disciple of Ramakrishna, a Yogi of nineteenth century Bengal. He is familiarly known as Latu Maharaj among the followers of Ramakrishna. Adbhutananda was the first monastic disciple to come to Ramakrishna. While most of Ramakrishna's direct disciples came from the Bengali intelligentsia, Adbhutananda's lack of formal education made him unique amongst them. He was a servant boy of a devotee of Ramakrishna, and he later became his monastic disciple. Though unlettered, Adbhutananda was considered as a monk with great spiritual insight by Ramakrishna's followers, and Vivekananda regarded him as "the greatest miracle of Ramakrishna".

=== Swami Advaitananda ===
Swami Advaitananda (1828–1909) was the oldest of the Ramakrishna's disciples. His original name was Gopal Chandra Ghosh. He came to Ramakrishna at the age of 55 sometime in March or April 1884, for solace when his wife died. At this first meeting, there seemed no connection between Ramakrishna and Gopal Ghosh. It was only after some persuasion by a friend that he paid a second visit. It was on this visit that Ramakrishna spoke to him about detachment. On the third visit, Gopal recalled, "The Master possessed me. I would think of him day and night. The pang of separation from the Master gave me chest pain. No matter how hard I tried, I couldn't forget his face."

Ramakrishna accepted Gopal as his disciple and addressed him as "the elder Gopal" or "Overseer" because he was eight years older than Ramakrishna. The other disciples called him "Gopal-da" (da denotes elder brother). He soon became a close attendant of Ramakrishna and assistant of Holy Mother. Ramakrishna praised his management of household matters and his sweet behavior with people. Several years later it was Gopal that gave Ramakrishna the ochre cloth which Ramakrishna used to initiate several of his disciples (including Gopal) into monastic life. In September 1885, when Ramakrishna moved to Shyampukur in Calcutta for treatment of his cancer and then in December to Cossipore, Gopal moved with him to attend him, giving him the medicine, washing the cancerous sores and assisting Holy Mother.

After the death of Ramakrishna in 1886 Gopal took sannyasa vows and became Swami Advaitananda. He had no place to go and, due to the kindness of a devotee, Surendra, a place was rented for him and the other monks to stay or visit at Baranagore, in the Calcutta suburbs. He was the first to take up residence in what became the first Math. He then lived with the other monks at the Baranagore Monastery but left in 1887 and went first to Varanasi then Kedarnath, Badrinath and Vrindaban. In 1890, he accompanied Holy Mother as she performed holy rites for ancestors at Gaya, and then he met up with Swami Vivekananda and six other monastic disciples in Meerut, staying together for a few weeks.

In 1887 Swami Advaitananda moved to Alambazar and then Nilambar Babu's garden house, joining Swami Vivekananda and other monastic disciples in building and developing the newly purchased site at Belur on the banks of the Ganges. He took responsibility for closely supervising the workers in leveling and clearing the former dock site. He also started a vegetable garden and dairy farm, despite the fact that he was the eldest of the monks.

Swami Turiyananda once said,

"We are much indebted to Gopal-da, because we learned the secret of work from him. He was organised and concentrated on everything he did. And he was very methodical in his habits. Until his last day he regularly practiced meditation."

In 1901, he was made one of the trustees of the Ramakrishna Math and Mission, later becoming the vice president. Even in his old age, he declined any personal assistance, believing that monks should be self-reliant. He chanted the Gita daily and accompanied the other monks on tabla when they sang.

Swami Advaitananda died on 28 December 1909 at the age of 81, chanting the name of Shri Ramakrishna.

=== Swami Akhandananda ===
Swami Akhandananda (1864–1937), whose original name was Gangadhar Ghatak, had met Paramahamsadev at Bosepara when he was just 13 years old. Later, he introduced him to Swami Vivekananda. As a boy he performed strict spiritual disciplines, bathing four times a day in the Ganges, he cooked his own vegetarian food and practiced so much pranayama (breathing exercise) that his body perspired and shook. He also practiced kumbhaka (retaining the breath) by diving in the Ganges and holding a stone. When he was eight, he had an abscess between his eyebrows, but ordered the doctor to cut it without anesthetic. His intelligence allowed him to memorise the English alphabet in one day, but he was not much interested in formal education. Later he memorised the Gita and Upanishads. Even as a child, he was compassionate by nature, and he gave his shirt to a school friend when his got ripped and frequently gave food to beggars secretively, so his parents would not know.

At the age of twelve he was given the sacred thread and afterwards repeated the Gayatri Mantra three times per day, and often made a clay image of Lord Shiva and worship him. Gangadhar and his friend Harinath met Sri Ramakrishna at Dinanath Basu's house in Baghbazar in 1877. Ramakrishna was in Samadhi and this intensified his spiritual longing. It was at the same age he disappeared with a monk without telling his parents and only returned home to his anxious parents when the monk suggested he was too young.

He met Ramakrishna for the second time at age nineteen in May 1883 at Dakshineswar, staying overnight and returning and staying overnight a few days later again. After that he regularly visited, usually during the week to avoid crowds. Later he observed that Ramakrishna had said most of his habits – eating only food cooked by himself, vegetarianism, practicing austerities – were for old people. Why, he thought, shouldn't he give them up? But later Ramakrishna explained to some visitors that it was due to his habits in previous lives that he acted so, after which Gangadhar maintained his practices.

On one occasion, a beggar asked Ramakrishna for money. Ramakrishna called Gangadhar and told him to give the beggar some coins, but to wash his hands in Ganges water afterwards. Afterwards he viewed money as dirty, and later wandered as a mendicant for fourteen years around India without touching money.

Once Ramakrishna moved to Cossipore for treatment of his throat cancer, Gangadhar would spend as much time as possible helping there, otherwise meditating on the banks of the Ganges with his friend Harinath. His father accepted his son was not going to complete his education and so arranged for him to work in an office. Gangadhar gave this up after a few days and fully engaged himself in serving Ramakrishna.

After Ramakrishna gave up his body Gangadhar went, on Christmas Eve 1886 to Antpur, and took vows of renunciation, just a few weeks later, in February 1887, he took the ochre cloth that the Master had previously given him and left the Math without telling the other monks and traveled around the Himalayas and into Tibet several times only returning after three years to the Baranagore Monastery in June 1890. The following month, Swami Vivekananda persuaded him to take the final monastic vows before Ramakrishna's picture and became Swami Akhandananda. Soon after, Swami Vivekananda took him back to the Himalayas as his guide, so he could fulfill his own longing to travel and practice there. At one point, both Vivekananda and Akandananda became sick and traveled to join Turiyananda at Dehradun to recover. Later they met again in Meerut and were joined by Brahmananda and Advaitananda, so that Meerut became a second Baranagore Monastery.

He continued his travels, ending up in Rajpur as a guest of a wealthy disciple of Vivekananda's. He was distressed to see how poor so many of the inhabitants of Rajasthan were, while a few rulers and landowners were very wealthy. He wrote to Vivekananda, who replied,

"No good will come of sitting idle and having princely dishes and saying 'Ramakrishna, O Lord!' unless you can do some good for the poor...It is preferable to live on grass for the sake of doing good for others. The ochre robe is not for enjoyment. It is the banner for heroic work...The poor, the illiterate, the ignorant, the afflicted – let these be your God. Know that service to these alone is the highest religion."

In 1894, he began his campaign. He realised the main cause of the problem was lack of education, so he went door to door in Khetri encouraging people to get their children educated. As a result, the enrollment at the local school soared from only 80 to 257. He also established five primary schools in the surrounding villages. He then went on to Jaipur, Chittor, Udaipur and many Rajpur villages asking local rulers to establish schools, distribute food and support local cottage industries. This was not always well-received and some threatened his life, but he continued regardless.

On 15 May 1897 Akhandananda began famine relief work in Mahula – it was the first organised relief work of the Mission that Vivekananda had started only two weeks before in Calcutta. He opened an orphanage and started schools as well. In Sargachi his work for the poor created unhappiness amongst some wealthy villagers who wrote letters of complaint to Vivekananda against him. In response, Vivekananda told him to continue his work, adding, "Criticisms are like ornaments to a pioneer." Other friends from his previous years told him a monk should travel, meditate and study scriptures. Akhandananda replied, those days were gone. He raised money and built an ashram and orphanage instead, often discarding his ocher monk robes and wearing the clothes of a poor farmer to till the land and grow food for the orphans. He taught the children during the day and the adults in the evening. Gradually, over many years, the ashram and orphanage grew, and he bought more land and increased the scope, adding an industrial school which taught many skills and crafts. It also had a library, dispensary and later a temple.

On the death of Brahmananda in 1922 Shivananda became president and Akhandananda vice-president, and on the death of Shivananda, was President of the Ramkrishna Mission from 1934 to 1937 when he died on 7 February aged 72.

=== Swami Subodhananda ===
Swami Subodhananda (1867–1933), whose original name was Subodh Chandra Ghosh, was also known as Khoka Maharaj. He belonged to the family of Shankar Ghosh, who owned the famous Kali Temple at Thanthania, in Kolkata and had tremendous power of meditation even in his younger days and that improved since he met Paramahamsadev in 1884.

=== Swami Vijnanananda ===
Swami Vijnanananda (1869–1938), whose original name was Hari Prasanna Chaterjee, was an engineer and had met Paramahamsadev early in life, but family commitments kept him away. He prepared it in consultation with a noted European architect of Kolkata, and Swamiji approved of the same. However, due to the sudden demise of Swamiji and lack of funds, the project had to wait for a long time to be taken up. It was completed and dedicated by Swami Vijnananda himself on 14 January 1938. He was President of the Ramkrishna Mission in 1937–38. He established Ramakrishna Sevasram at Allahabad.

=== Swami Ramakrishnananda ===
Swami Ramakrishnananda (13 July 1863 – 21 August 1911) was the main pillar of the Math, according to Swami Vivekananda. He was responsible for initiating all the formal ritual worships conducted at the Ramakrishna Order. He was also a Sanskrit scholar.

=== Swami Premananda ===
Swami Premananda (10 December 1861 – 30 July 1918) was a direct disciple of Ramakrishna. He was born Baburam Ghosh.. He was given the name of Premananda or "joy of divine love" by disciple Vivekananda. He played a key role during the early days of Ramakrishna Mission as he managed the whole affairs of Belur Math from 1902 to 1916.

== Householder disciples ==
The following are among Ramakrishna's householder disciples and devotees:

- Purna Chandra Ghosh — introduced to Sri Ramakrishna by Shri Mahendra Gupta, publisher of Kathamrita
- Adhar Sen — Deputy Magistrate, Fellow and member of Faculty of Arts of Calcutta University
- Baidyanath — Advocate High Court, Calcutta
- Ram Chandra Datta, Chemical Examiner at Calcutta Medical College and Professor of Chemistry at Science Association
- Manomohan Mittra
- Mahendranath Gupta
- Girish Chandra Ghosh
- Yogin Ma — Yogindra Mohini Biswas Born as Yogindra Mohini Mitra
- Pratap Chandra Majumdar
- Sivanath Sastri
- Girish Chandra Sen
- Upadhyay Brahmabandhav
- Balaram Bose
- Surendra Nath Mittra
- Durga charan Nag (Nag Mahasaya)
- Akshay Kumar Sen
- Vishwanath Upadhyaya — Ambassador of the Nepalese Govt. to the Viceroy of India
- Ishaan Chandra Mukhopadhyay — Superintendent of Accountant General's Office, Bengal
- Sri Amulyaratn Bhattacharya

== Others ==
Ramakrishna's wife, Sarada Devi, is the first disciple of Sri Ramakrishna paramahamsa.
