= Teachings of Ramakrishna =

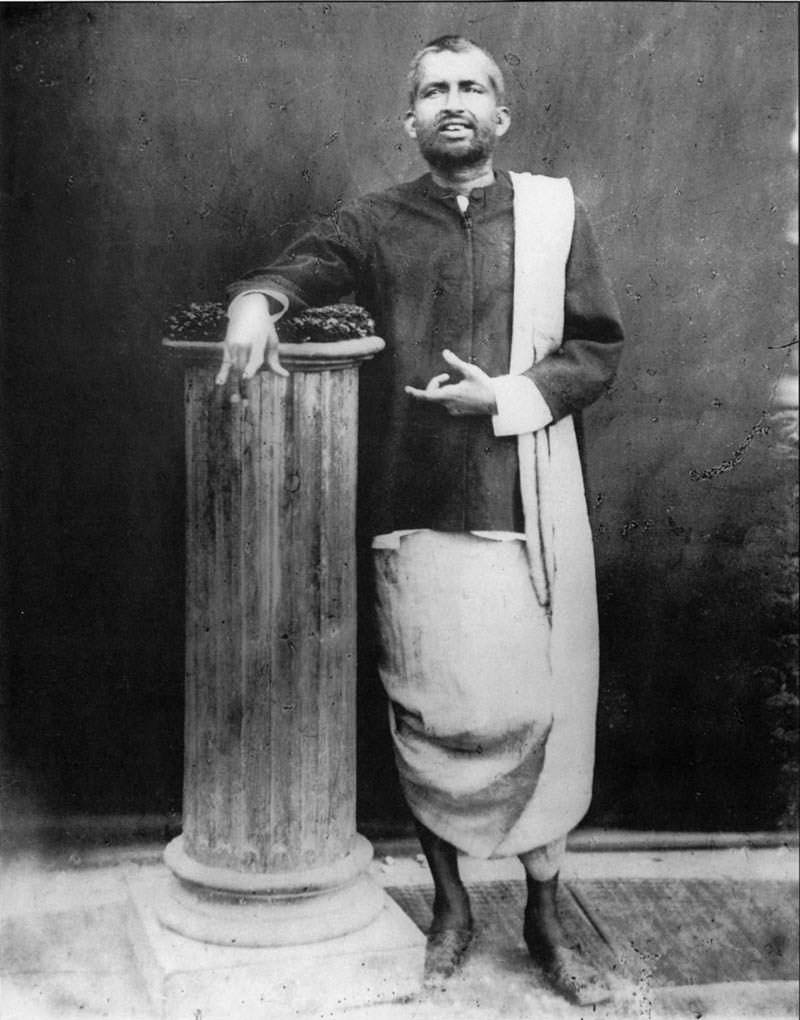
Ramakrishna (1881, Calcutta)

Ramakrishna Paramahamsa (1836–1886) is a famous nineteenth-century Bengali mystic. Ramakrishna was a teacher of popular appeal, speaking in rustic Bengali with stories and parables. Ramakrishna's main teachings included God realization as the supreme goal of life, renunciation of Kama-Kanchana, Harmony of Religions and Jiva is Shiva. Key concepts in Ramakrishna's teachings included the oneness of existence and the unity and truth of all religions.

== God-realisation ==
Ramakrishna noted that God-realisation is the supreme goal of all living beings. Ramakrishna's mystical experiences through different religions led him to teach that various religions are different means to reach absolute knowledge and bliss—and that the different religions cannot express the totality of absolute truth, but can express aspects of it.

== Kama-Kanchana ==
Ramakrishna taught that the primal bondage in human life is Kama-Kanchana (lust and gold). When speaking to men, Ramakrishna warned them against kamini-kanchana, or "women and gold",

"Through the discipline of constant practice one is able to give up attachment to 'woman and gold'. That is what the Gita says. By practice one acquires uncommon power of mind. Then one doesn't find it difficult to subdue the sense-organs and to bring anger, lust, and the like under control. Such a man behaves like a tortoise, which, once it has tucked in its limbs, never puts them out. You cannot make the tortoise put its limbs out again, though you chop it to pieces with an axe."

"The renunciation of 'woman and gold' is the true renunciation."

When speaking to women, he warned them against purusha-kanchana, or "man and gold." Gauri Ma, one of Ramakrishna's prominent women disciples, said that:

[Ramakrishna] has uttered this note of warning, against gold and sensuality, against a life of enjoyment, but surely not against women. Just as he advised the ascetic-minded men to guard themselves against women's charms, so also did he caution pious women against men's company. The Master's whole life abounds with proofs to show that he had not the slightest contempt or aversion for women; rather he had intense sympathy and profound regard for them.

== Avidyamaya and vidyamaya ==
Devotees believe that Ramakrishna's realisation of nirvikalpa samadhi also led him to an understanding of the two sides of maya, or illusion, to which he referred as Avidyamaya and vidyamaya. He explained that avidyamaya represents dark forces of creation (e.g. sensual desire, evil passions, greed, lust and cruelty), which keep people on lower planes of consciousness. These forces are responsible for human entrapment in the cycle of birth and death, and they must be fought and vanquished. Vidyamaya, on the other hand, represents higher forces of creation (e.g. spiritual virtues, enlightening qualities, kindness, purity, love, and devotion), which elevate human beings to the higher planes of consciousness.

== Harmony of religions ==
Ramakrishna recognised differences among religions but realised that in spite of these differences, all religions lead to the same ultimate goal, and hence they are all valid and true. Amiya P. Sen writes that the deep foundations in bhakti or devotion and faith in God makes Ramakrishna's teachings look universalistic and not his culturally determined forms. The distinguished British historian Arnold J. Toynbee has written: “... Mahatma Gandhi’s principle of non-violence and Sri Ramakrishna’s testimony to the harmony of religions: here we have the attitude and the spirit that can make it possible for the human race to grow together into a single family–and in the Atomic Age, this is the only alternative to destroying ourselves.”

Regarding Harmony of Religions, Ramakrishna said,

"I have practised all religions—Hinduism, Islam, Christianity—and I have also followed the paths of the different Hindu sects. I have found that it is the same God toward whom all are directing their steps, though along different paths. You must try all beliefs and traverse all the different ways once. Wherever I look, I see men quarrelling in the name of religion—Hindus, Mohammedans, Brahmos, Vaishnavas, and the rest. But they never reflect that He who is called Krishna is also called Siva, and bears the name of the Primal Energy, Jesus, and Allah as well—the same Rama with a thousand names..."

== Jiva is Shiva and other teachings ==
Ramakrishna's proclamation of jatra jiv tatra Shiv (wherever there is a living being, there is Shiva) stemmed from his Advaitic perception of Reality. This taught his disciples, "Jive daya noy, Shiv gyane jiv seba" (not kindness to living beings, but serving the living being as Shiva Himself). According to scholars, Vivekananda derived his inspiration from this message and took initiative in social activities like famine relief, pm on maintenance of orphanages, opening of training centers, educational institutions, dispensaries and the like—"Where should you go to seek for God? Are not all the poor, the miserable, the weak, god? Why not worship them first?...Let these people be your God..." Ramakrishna did not directly participate in social service, but entrusted the task to his chief disciple Vivekananda.

Ramakrishna, though not formally trained as a philosopher, had an intuitive grasp of complex philosophical concepts. According to him brahmanda, the visible universe and many other universes, are mere bubbles emerging out of Brahman, the supreme ocean of consciousness and intelligence.

Like Adi Sankara had done more than a thousand years earlier, Ramakrishna Paramahamsa revitalised Hinduism which had been fraught with excessive ritualism and superstition in the nineteenth century and helped it become better-equipped to respond to challenges from Islam, Christianity and the dawn of the modern era. However, unlike Adi Sankara, Ramakrishna developed ideas about the post-samadhi descent of consciousness into the phenomenal world, which he went on to term "Vijñāna". While he asserted the supreme validity of Advaita Vedanta, he also stated that "I accept both the Nitya and the Leela, both the Absolute and the Relative."

== Parables ==
Parables formed a very important part of Ramakrishna's teachings. Ramakrishna conveyed his spiritual and moral messages through tales and parables.

The Parable of the Greatest Devotee, is one of his famous parables—

Once upon a time conceit entered into the heart of Narada and he thought there was no greater devotee than himself. Reading his heart, the Lord said, "Narada, go to such and such a place, a great devotee of mine is living there. Cultivate his acquaintance; for he is truly devoted to me." Narada went there and found a farmer who rose early in the morning, pronounced the name of Hari (God) only once, and taking his plough, went out and tilled the ground all day long. At night,. he went to bed after pronouncing the name of Hari once more. Narada said to himself "How can this rustic be a lover of God? I see him busily engaged in worldly duties and he has no signs of a pious man about him." Then Narada went back to the Lord, and spoke what he thought of his new acquaintance. There upon the Lord said, "Narada, take this cup of oil and go round this city and come back with it. But take care that you do not spill even a single drop of it." Narada did as he was told, and on his return the Lord asked him, "Well, Narada, how many times did you remember me in the course of your walk round the city?" "Not once, my Lord," said Narada, "and how could I, when I had to watch this cup brimming over with oil?" The Lord then said, "This one cup of oil did so divert your attention that even you did forget me altogether. But look at that rustic, who, though carrying the heavy burden of a family, still remembers me twice every day."

The Parable of the Pandit who could not swim is another famous parable of Ramakrishna, a story akin to the fable of the Fox and the Cat—

Once several men were crossing the Ganges in a boat. One of them, a pandit, was making a great display of his erudition, saying that he has studied various books—the Vedas, the Vedanta, the six systems of philosophy. He asked a fellow passenger, 'Do you know the Vedanta?' 'No, revered sir.' 'The Samkhya and the Patanjala?' 'No, revered sir.' 'Have you read no philosophy whatsoever?' 'No, revered sir.' The pandit was talking in this vain way and the passenger sitting in silence, when a great storm arose and the boat was about to sink. The passenger said to the pandit, 'Sir, can you swim?' 'No', replied the pundit. The passenger said, 'I don't know the Samkhya or the Patanjala, but I can swim.'

== See also ==
- Sri-Sri-Ramakrisna-kathamrta
