= Surendra Nath Mitra =

Devotee of Sri Ramakrishna Paramahansa

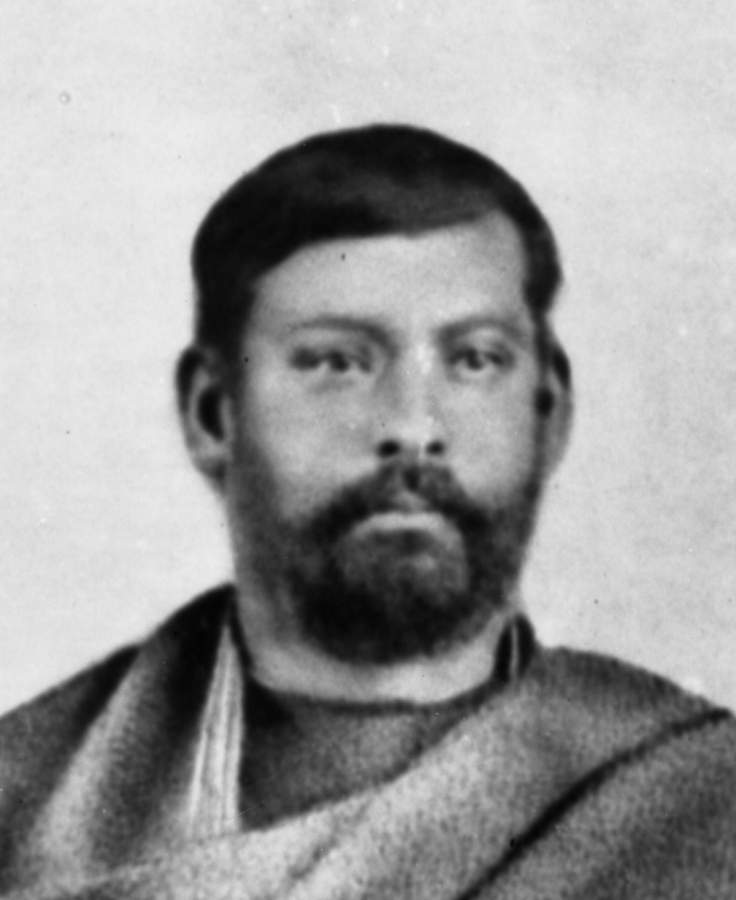
- Born: Suresh Mitra; 1850
- Died: 25 May 1890 (aged 39–40); Calcutta, Bengal Presidency, British India
- Occupation: foremost householder devotee of Sri Ramakrishna
- Writing career
- Period: 19th century
- Literary movement: Bengal Renaissance, Sri Ramakrishna

Surendra Nath Mitra a.k.a. Surendranath Mitra (1850 – 25 May 1890) was one of the prominent devotees of Sri Ramakrishna Paramahamsa. He came from a very prosperous background and had the fortune of sponsoring the expenditures of the Master and his devotees when the Master lived in Calcutta in his last days. He was also known as Suresh Chandra Mitra, but Sri Ramakrishna called him "Surendra". Suresh lived in Simulia Street, the same locality as Narendranath (Swami Vivekananda).

== Biography ==
Mitra was probably born in 1850. Little is known about his early life, except that it was carefree and open, like that of many rich people in erstwhile Bengal. According to his own testimony, Mitra was initially indifferent towards religion.

=== Meeting with Sri Ramakrishna ===
Mitra (aged 30) probably met Sri Ramakrishna in 1880, when he went there in company with another prominent householder disciple, Ram Chandra Datta. Ramakrishna accepted him with all his past vices and preached to him on self-surrender. From then on, Mitra, became a frequent visitor to Dakshineswar temple.

=== Contribution towards Ramakrishna Movement ===
Mitra had several notable contributions towards the early growth of the Ramakrishna Order. While Sri Ramakrishna was in Dakshineswar, he supplied Rs 10/- every month for the devotees of Sri Ramakrishna. Though small in amount, the sum went a long way in meeting the daily needs of the devotees who stayed with the Master.

Sri Ramakrishna suffered from a terminal throat cancer and had to be shifted to the city of Calcutta. Naturally, many devotees thronged to the place where he lived. The young devotees like Swami Vivekananda spent almost all their time-serving the Master in those days. This was the time when they took the oath of renunciation. They left their homes and dedicated their lives to serving the Master. Mitra bore the entire expenditure of the Cossipore Garden House (about Rs 60 per month), where Sri Ramakrishna spent his last days. He also joined with other householder disciples to bear the expenses of his monastic brother disciples.

Mitra commissioned the famous oil painting in which Sri Ramakrishna points out the harmony of religions to Keshab Chandra Sen.

After the Master left his body, the young devotees of Sri Ramakrishna Paramahamsa were told to go back home. Their spiritual practices were hindered due to lack of funding, and they had to go through a difficult phase of life. It was in this phase that Sri Ramakrishna appeared in a vision to Mitra and scolded him for neglecting his children.

According to The Gospel of Sri Ramakrishna, volume 5, Mitra had come to Narendra (Swami Vivekananda) and requested that he find a house where the monastic disciples could reside. It was also a place where the householder disciples could come and spend some time in solitude, away from the din and bustle - "A cool haven for the unfortunate ones being roasted in the crucible of the world". He promised that he would sponsor its rent. Thus began the formation of Baranagar Math, which was later moved first to Alambazar and then to Belur.

Mitra immediately jumped into action and rented a house where the young monks could stay. It was in Baranagore, midway north between Calcutta and Dakshineswar. He also sponsored a part of their expenses and spent around Rs 100 a month meeting their expenses. Many other household devotees of the Master followed Mitra's example. Swami Vivekananda and other young disciples began living in an old, neglected house where they focused on their spiritual practices.

During the construction of Belur Math, the marble flooring in the shrine-room was installed using a lump sum of money that Mitra had set aside for the Math.

=== Devotion and loyalty towards Sri Ramakrishna ===
According to The Gospel of Sri Ramakrishna by Mahendranath Gupta and other literary sources on Sri Ramakrishna, Mitra was one of the most faithful household devotees. The Gospel of Sri Ramakrishna also illustrates many vices of Mitra. However, his most significant contribution was his steadfast loyalty and unwavering faith to his Master. While being engaged in his family Durga Puja, he had a vision that the Master himself was present in the Puja, though Sri Ramakrishna was then bed-ridden in Shyampukur. Later, Ramakrishna himself recounted this incident to Mitra.

=== Death ===
Mitra died on 25 May 1890, at the age of forty, in Kolkata (Calcutta).

Little is known about his death except Swami Vivekananda's lament to his disciple Sarat Chandra Chakravarty that Mitra's family did not allow his brother disciples to look after him, presumably because of their fear of losing their property to the Ramakrishna Order. The exact conversation is provided here:

"Disciple: Sir, I have heard that you did not see him very often while he was dying.

Swamiji: We could only do so if we were allowed [by his relatives]. Well, it is a long tale. But know this for certain that among worldly people it is of little count to your relatives and kinsmen whether you live or die. If you succeed in leaving some property, you will find even in your lifetime that there has been set up a brawl over it in your household. You will have no one to console you in your death-bed – not even your wife and sons! Such is the way of the world!" – Sarat Chandra Chankravarty
