= Adhar =

Adhar may refer to:

== People ==
- Adhar Kumar Chatterji (1914–2001), Chief of the Naval Staff of the Indian Navy, first Indian Navy full admiral
- Adhar Sen (1855–1885), a disciple of the Indian mystic and yogi Ramakrishna
- Adhar, an alternative spelling of the Persian name Azar

== Other uses ==
- Aadhaar, an identity number issued by the Unique Identification Authority of India
- ādhār, an Arabic name for the month of March; see Arabic names of calendar months

== See also ==
- Adar, a month in the Hebrew calendar
- Aadhaaram, a 1992 Indian film
