= Surendra Nagar (disambiguation) =

Surendranagar Dudhrej or Surendranagar and Surendra Nagar is a municipality in Surendranagar district, Gujarat, India.

Surendra Nagar may refer to:

- Surendranagar district, an administrative district in Saurashtra region, Gujarat, India
  - Surendranagar Lok Sabha constituency, Gujarat, India
- Surendra Singh Nagar (born 1965), Indian politician from Uttar Pradesh

== See also ==
- Surendra, an Indian male given name
- Nagar (disambiguation)
