= Surendra =

Surendra is an Indian masculine given name. Notable people with this name include:

- Surendra (actor), Indian singer and actor
- Surendra Bhave
- Surendra Chaturvedi
- Surendra Dubey
- Surendra Gambhir
- Surendra Hiranandani
- Surendra Jain
- Surendra Jha 'Suman'
- Surendra Kumar Datta
- Surendra Kumar Sinha
- Surendra Lal
- Surendra Lath
- Surendra Mishra
- Surendra Mohanty
- Surendra Motilal Patel
- Surendra Nath Mitra
- Surendra Nath
- Surendra of Nepal
- Surendra Pal
- Surendra Pandey
- Surendra Poonia
- Surendra Prakash Goyal
- Surendra Ramachandran
- Surendra Sai
- Surendra Seeraj
- Surendra Sheodas Barlingay
- Surendra Singh (disambiguation), several people
- Surendra Verma (science writer)
- Surendra Verma

== See also ==
- Surendra Institute of Engineering & Management
- Surinder, another given name
