= Surinder =

Surinder is an Indian masculine given name. Notable people with the name include:

- Surinder Amarnath (born 1948), former Indian Test and One Day International cricketer
- Surinder Arora, Punjabi English businessman whose hotel business is believed to make him worth £225 million
- Surinder Singh Bajwa (1955–2007), the Deputy Mayor of Delhi
- Surinder Singh Kairon, the son of late Sardar Pratap Singh Kairon
- Surinder Kapoor (1925–2011), Bollywood film producer, President of the Film & Television Producers Guild of India 1995–2001
- Surinder Kaur, Punjabi singer-songwriter
- Surinder Kaur (field hockey) (born 1982), member of the India women's national field hockey team
- Surinder Khanna (born 1956), former Indian cricketer
- Surinder Kumar (academic), academic and entrepreneur
- Surinder Pal (born 1953), Indian film and television character actor
- Surinder Shinda, Indian singer of bhangra music with traditional Punjabi roots
- Surinder Singh, Indian classical singer, of musical duo Singh Bandhu
- Surinder Singh Sodhi, former field hockey player from India
- Surinder Singh Sodhi (Sikh), a Sikh militant
- Surindar Kumar Trehan, Indian mathematician
- Surinder Vasal (born 1938), World Food Prize laureate

== See also ==
- Surendra, another given name
- Surinder Singh Kanda v. The Government of the Federation of Malaya (1962) 28 MLJ 169
