= Alambazar Math =

Second monastery of Ramakrishna Order, situated in Baranagar, India

- Logo
- Formation: 1892; 134 years ago
- Headquarters: Belur
- Coordinates: 22.647352°N 88.364682°E
- Website: alambazarmath.azurewebsites.net

Alambazar Math is the second monastery of the Ramakrishna Order established in February 1892, which remained the order's headquarters till February 1898, when it was finally moved to Belur village on the bank of Ganga.

The Alambazar Math finally got merged with the Ramakrishna Math and Mission, Belur on 7 November 2022, on the holy Janmatithi (birth anniversary) of Srimat Swami Vijnananandaji Maharaj, a direct disciple of Sri Ramakrishna. The deed was signed by Swami Suviranandaji Maharaj, the general secretary of Ramakrishna Math.

It was earlier managed by Ramakrishna Satyanand Ashram and merging it with the Ramakrishna mission was a much awaited event.

== History ==
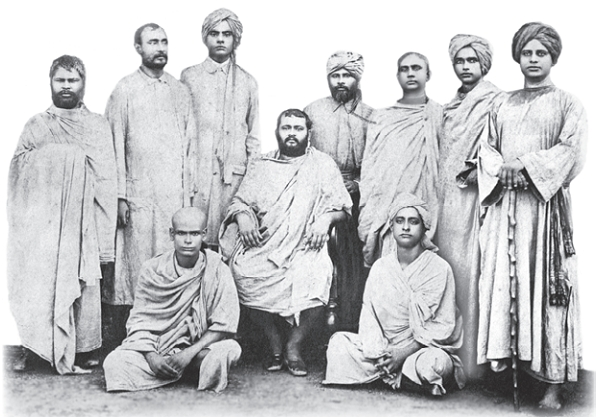
Alambazar Math 1896

After the demise of Sri Ramakrishna, the 19th century mystic and saint, some of his younger disciples decided to stay together and perform spiritual practices following the ideology of saint. Prominent among them were Narendra Nath Dutta, later famous as Swami Vivekananda and Rakhal Chandra Ghosh, later Swami Brahmananda, who was also the first president of the Ramakrishna Order. The first monastery of the Ramakrishna order was established in Baranagar, Calcutta and it came to be known as the Baranagar Math. The dilapidated building of Baranagar Math could not serve the monastery for long and hence in 1892, the Math was shifted to a new building in Alambazar, a place in Baranagar. The building was dis reputed as a haunted house as two persons had committed suicide there and hence it was available cheap.

=== Building layout ===
The house was fairly large, quadrangular, two storey building comprising two sections, outer and inner. The Ramakrishna shrine in the Alambazar Math was situated in the first floor of the building. The brother disciples slept together in the large hall in the ground floor. The building was adorned with a pond, several country wells and an orchard. There were balconies on the ground and first floor and the building overlooked the present Deshbandhu Road. There were two flights of stairs to reach the first floor. Near the shrine were three rooms used by Swami Nirmalananda, Swami Abhedananda, and Swami Ramakrishnananda. Vivekananda stayed in the second room in the western side of the first floor.

=== Members ===
When the Math premises were shifted, at that time most of the brother disciples of Sri Ramakrishna, including Swami Vivekananda, were wandering monks in various parts of India. Swami Ramakrishnananda assisted for most part of the period by Swami Nirmalananda was the only person who stayed indoor throughout and took care of the activities of the monastery during this period. Among the direct disciples of Sri Ramakrishna, Swami Brahmananda came back to Alambazar Math in 1895. Swami Turiyananda and Swami Shivananda returned to stay in the Math in 1894. Swami Premananda came back a few days after the return of Swami Vivekananda. Swami Niranjananda returned to stay before the birth anniversary of Sri Ramakrishna in 1895. Swami Saradananda was a permanent resident from the beginning, from where he left for Europe in 1895. Swami Abhedananda also traveled widely before he settled in Alambazar Math in 1892. Swami Trigunatitananda stayed for about two years, from 1892 to 1894. Brahmachari Hariprasanna, later Swami Vijnanananda, joined Alambazar Math after the return of Swami Vivekananda. New members who joined as Brahmacharins or monks, who stayed in Alambazar monastery, included Swami Virajananda and Swami Nirbhayananda.

=== Important visitors ===
Durga Charan Nag, better known as Nag Mahasay, an important householder disciple of Sri Ramakrishna, visited the Math. Girish Chandra Ghosh, the famous playwright and father of modern theater in India, used to visit the monastery as a devotee. In 1896, Dr. Turnbull, who had heard Swami Vivekananda in Chicago and was an ardent fan, visited Alambazar Math. Gopaler Ma and Gauri Ma, two foremost women devotees of Sri Ramakrishna, were also occasional visitors.

=== Important events ===
Swami Vivekananda went to America in 1893 and participated in the parliament of religions when the monastery was located in Alambazar. He also came back to stay in Alambazar monastery. He wrote several letters to his brother disciples in Alambazar Math, several of which were addressed to Swami Ramakrishnananda, between 1894 and 1896. He advised them on management affairs, Governing Body and also the organization structure and activities of the proposed monastery.

The inmates of Alambazar Math, most notably Swami Abhedananda and Swami Yogananda (Yogin Maharaj) organized a public convention to declare Swami Vivekananda as the official representative of Hinduism in Calcutta Townhall, which was presided by Raja Pyarimohan Mukherjee and attended by the famous persons of Calcutta in 1894.

After his return from the West, Swami Vivekananda, stayed for sometime in the Alambazar Math and here he framed the rules and guidelines for a future Ramakrishna Order.

An earthquake on 12 June 1897 caused much damage to the building, and the monastery had to be shifted to Nilambar Mukherjee's garden house in Belur.

It is in this Math that Swamiji first taught systematic meditation to the disciples.

In this Math, Swamiji first gave the vow of Sannyasa to his disciples.

== Celebrations in the Math ==
It is in this Math that the first birthday celebration of Sarada Devi was organized on 16 December 1897. Swami Prakashananda conducted the worship and the homa (fire) ceremony.[S.P: p. 92]

In October 1897 Durga Puja was celebrated in at this Math. It was conducted with a photo of Mother instead of the Durga image. On the Kali Puja night, the inmates performed "Guru Puja". Premananda performed the puja and homa.[S.P: p. 160]

Adbhutananda (Latu) and one Shivaratri night conducted the worship of Shiva throughout the four quarters of the night [Ghatanabali]

== Present state ==
The building remained in a dilapidated state, was neglected for about seventy years and was forcefully occupied through illegal encroachments. Swami Satyananda, a disciple of Swami Abhedananda, first started the initiative to reclaim the historic building. A portion was finally purchased in 1968. The tenants opposed the establishment of the monastery, and they threatened the monks. Slowly all the rooms were occupied by the newly established Sri Ramakrishna Satyananda Ashrama and most of the tenants agreed to leave after being paid hefty compensation. In 2007 the remaining portion of the old monastery building was purchased, but it was still not completely encroachment free. As part of the celebration of 150 years of Swami Vivekananda, the Government of India has officially recognized the Alambazar Math as a national heritage structure and has initiated a project to restore the building and set up a Vivekananda Centre for Spiritual Culture. Prime Minister of India Dr. Manmohan Singh wrote an appreciation letter and with his help, the ministry of culture, Government of India's National Culture Fund, has come forward to help partially fund the restoration work. Archaeological Survey of India has taken up the restoration and reconstruction project.

== See also ==
- Ramakrishna Mission
- Swami
