= Manomohan Mittra =

Indian mystic (1851–1903)

Manomohan Mittra (1851–1903) is one of the household disciples of Ramakrishna Paramahamsa.

== Early life ==
Manomohan was born in September 1851 at Konnagar, Hooghly district, West Bengal. His father Bhuban Mohan Mittra was a physician, and well versed in History, science, and English literature. He was greatly influenced by his parents. At that time Indian society was under the influence of Western culture. In spite of his western education, he was against Western hedonism and was a defender of traditional Hindu culture. Manomohan's mother Shyama Sundari, was very pious, and observed the Hindu rituals and festivals with devotion.

== Meeting with Sri Ramakrishna ==
On a Saturday night of 1879, he had a dream in which the whole world had been flooded with water. He was the lone survivor. When he was worried about his family, he heard a voice saying that No one is alive in this world. All are dead. Only they have survived from this deluge who have realized God. You will meet them very soon and live with them. He woke up at 4:00 AM and laid there perplexed for some time. When he regained his consciousness, he realized that it was a dream.

Later that morning he went to see his cousin Ram Chandra Datta and told him about the dream. Manomohan had read about the spiritual life of Sri Ramakrishna in the magazines like Indian Mirror, Sulabh Samachar, and other newspapers. So he suggested that they visit him in Dakshineswar. Ram immediately agreed. It was this dream that brought Manomohan to Sri Ramakrishna.

On Sunday, 13 November 1879, the day after that strange dream, he, Ram Chandra Datta, and their friend Gopal Chandra Mitra left for Dakshineswar by boat to visit Sri Ramakrishna. Since Manomohan was an ardent devotee of Keshub Chandra Sen and the Brahmo Samaj, he was averse to image worship. Sri Ramakrishna understood Manomohan's attitude and told him: As an imitation custard apple reminds one of the real fruit, so the divine images enkindle the presence of God. He is all powerful. It is possible for him to manifest in anything. Manomohan, Ram and Gopal had a long conversation with Sri Ramakrishna, and they returned to Calcutta that evening with full of peace and joy.

== Family ==
Manomohan's sister is married to Rakhal Chandra Ghosh (Swami Brahmananda), another disciple of Ramakrishna.
