= Balaram Mandir =

Hindu temple in Kolkata

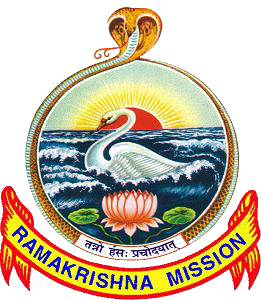
- Emblem

Religion
- Affiliation: Hinduism

Location
- Location: Baghbazar, Kolkata, West Bengal, India
- Interactive map of Balaram Mandir
- Coordinates: 22.601987°N 88.367025°E

Website
- belurmath.org

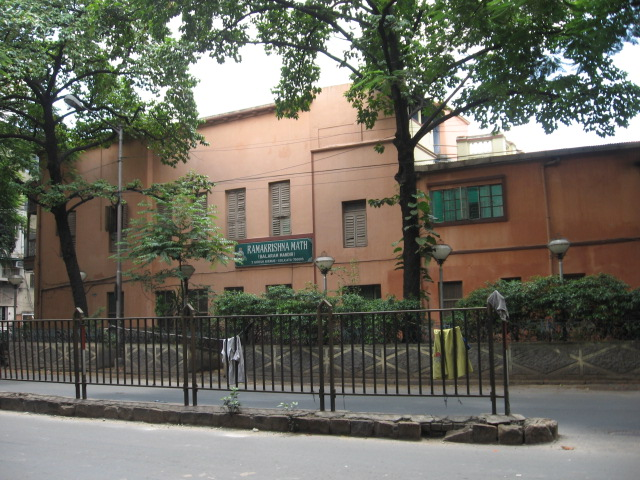
Balaram Mandir

Balaram Mandir is a temple and a branch of Ramakrishna Mission and Ramakrishna Math located at 7, Girish Avenue, Baghbazar, Kolkata.

== History ==
Balaram Mandir was the residence of Balaram Bose, a disciple of Ramakrishna. On 1 May 1897, Swami Vivekananda organized a meeting in this house to finalize his plans to establish Ramakrishna Mission. In 1922, the converted into an independent place of worship for Ramakrishna-Vivekananda followers. In 2002, it became a branch centre of Ramakrishna Mission.

== Activities ==
Currently, Balaram Mandir is a branch of Ramakrishna Math and Mission. Some of the activities conducted by the centre are:

1. Daily worships;
2. Lectures and discourses;
3. Celebration of births of Ramakrishna, Sarada Devi, Swami Vivekananda;

The centre also has a public library.
