= Avidyamaya and vidyamaya =

Mystical realizations-based concepts

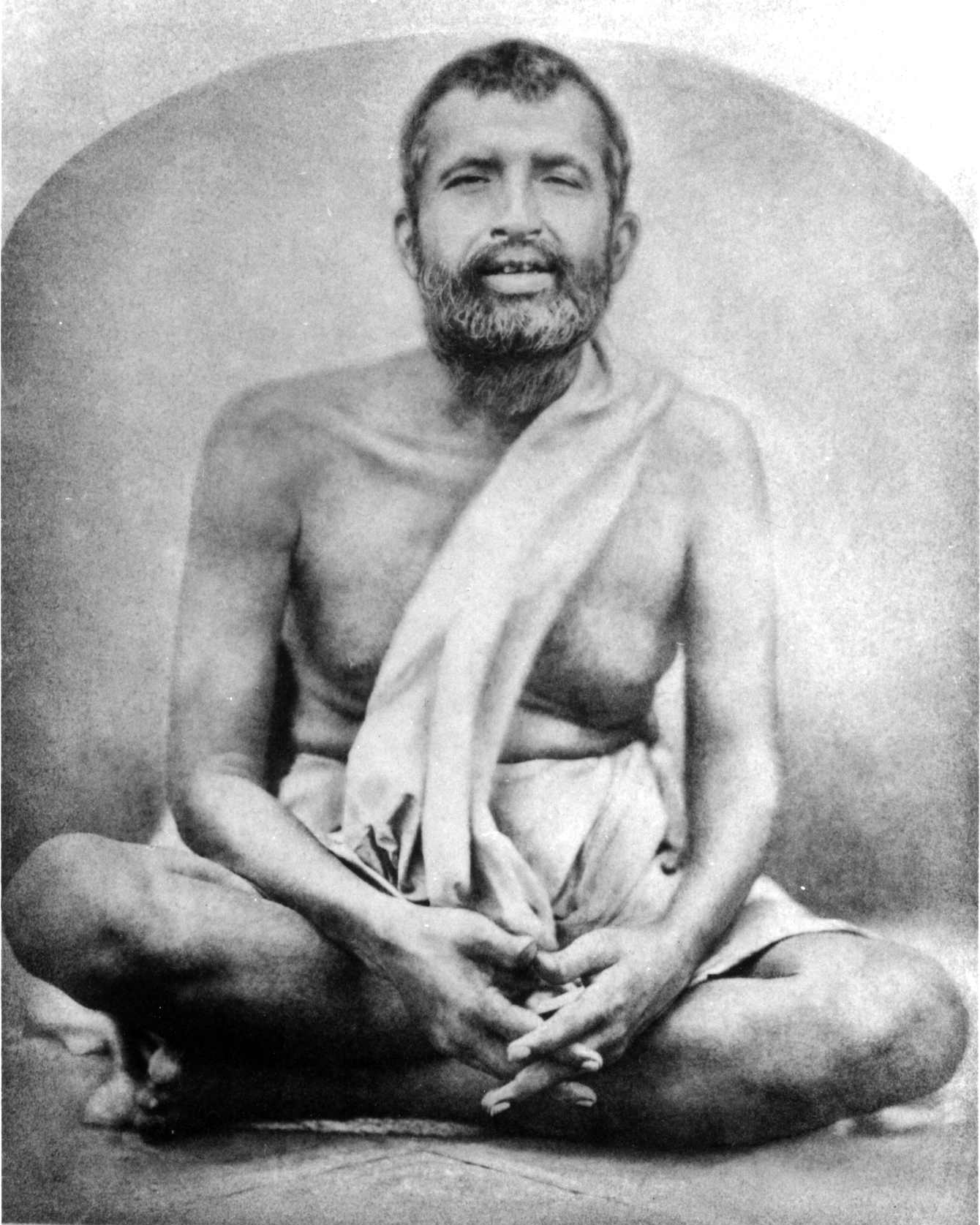
Sri Ramakrishna Paramahamsa

Avidyamaya and Vidyamaya are concepts created by the Hindu sage Ramakrishna based on his mystical realizations. Literally, vidyamaya means "wisdom-illusion", and avidyamaya means "un-wisdom-illusion".

Ramakrishna implied that all things, good and bad, were maya (illusion). According to him, both love and hate, materialism and spirituality, egotism and generosity exist only due to our limited perception of Reality. However, he divided them into illusions that further bind us (avidyamaya) and illusions that take us further onto the dispelling of maya (vidyamaya).

According to his Hindu school of thought, as one cannot trust one's eyes before a trained magician, also the human five senses draw and drag us further into illusions and false conclusions. However, the embracing and realization of some concepts that are not sensual (i.e., of the senses), such as love, generosity, spirituality, all of them vidyamaya, take us further away from sticking to what we see, touch, smell, hear, taste.

Quote: "Vidyamaya may be likened to the last few steps before the roof. Next is the roof, the realization of God."
