= Durga Charan Nag =

Disciple of Ramakrishna Paramahansa

Durga Charan Nag (Nag Mahasay) দুর্গাচরণ নাগ (Bengali)
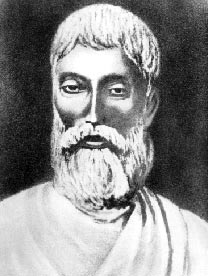
- Nag Mahasaya (Durga Charan Nag), a 19th-century saint from East Bengal and a householder disciple of Ramakrishna Paramahansa

Personal life
- Born: Durga Charan Nag; 1846 Deobhog, Narayanganj district, Bengal Presidency, British India, (present-day in Bangladesh)
- Died: 1899 (aged 52–53) Deobhog, Bengal Presidency, British India, (present-day in Bangladesh)

Religious life
- Religion: Hinduism
- Philosophy: Advaita Vedanta

Religious career
- Teacher: Ramakrishna Paramahansa

Quotation

It is easier to earn fame than to renounce it. He who can renounce it is a really great man.

Durga Charan Nag (Bengali: দুর্গাচরণ নাগ), better known as Nag Mahasaya (Mahasaya, lit. 'great soul'), was one of the householder disciples of Sri Ramakrishna Paramahansa, who referred to him as "a blazing fire" upon first meeting him. He shunned material wealth and regarded every human being as God on earth. He lived on a meager income, and spent most of it on serving the poor, his guests, and monks and ascetics.

Sarat Chandra Chakravarty, a direct disciple of Swami Vivekananda and the author of the book "Diary of a Disciple" (Swami-Sishya Sangbad, in Bengali) wrote a biography of Nag Mahasaya. Most of the informat ion currently available on Nag Mahasaya has been obtained through works regarding Sri Ramakrishna, his teacher and master, and Swami Vivekananda, the foremost disciple of Ramakrishna.

According to other fellow disciples of Sri Ramakrishna, including Vivekananda, he was a shining example of renunciation and love for God. Vivekananda was quoted as saying, during a conversation with Chakravarty, ‘All the characteristics of the highest type of devotion, spoken of in the scriptures, have manifested themselves in Nag Mahashaya. It is only in him that we actually see fulfilled the widely quoted text, "Trinadapi Sunichena". ("Lowlier than the lowly stalk of grass.") Blessed indeed is your East Bengal to have been hallowed by the touch of Nag Mahasaya's feet!’ There is a charitable organisation bearing his name run in his hometown of Deobhog.

Nag Mahasaya died in 1899 in his home in his village.

== Biography ==
=== Early life ===
Nag Mahasaya was born in Deobhog village (Narayanganj district) in East Bengal (present Bangladesh) in 1846 to Dindayal Nag and his wife Tripurasundari Devi. Nag Mahasaya lost his mother early in his life. Dindayal Nag did not remarry, so the task of bringing up Nag Mahasaya and his younger sister fell upon Bhagavati, his aunt, the elder sister of Dindayal.

Little is known about Nag Mahasaya's childhood, except that he was sweet tongued, well-behaved and modest. He was serene in appearance. His aunt told him stories of Puranas, Ramayana and Mahabharata which had a deep and lasting influence on his subsequent life. He was always truthful and was pious.

Nag Mahasaya had a deep love for education, but there was no school in his village. He studied for sometimes in a vernacular school in Narayanganj district, but had to leave after third standard, the highest class in that school. His father wanted to send him to Calcutta to study, but could not bear the expense. Nag Mahasaya set off to search for a school in Dacca. He travelled on foot a distance of 10 miles from Narayanganj to reach Dacca and after much effort enrolled himself to the Normal school where he studied for the next 15 months. Later he came to Calcutta to study medical science.

=== Marriage and Life as a Medical Practitioner ===
Nag Mahasaya married eleven-year-old Prasanna Kumari in accordance with the customs prevailing at that time in Bengal. 5 months after his marriage, he came to Calcutta to study in Campbell School of Medicine, but he could not study for long. After this, he studied Homeopathy under Dr. Behari Lal Bhaduri. At this point, his first wife died of dysentery, and he hardly could have had any interaction with her. He treated and distributed medicine to the poor free of cost, having success even while treating very difficult cases.

Nag Mahasaya's life took a new turn when he met Suresh Datta, who belonged to the Brahmo sect. Even though they had quite different beliefs, they were friendly with each other. Suresh took him to the Nababidhan Brahmo Samaj founded by Keshab Chandra Sen, the then famous religious leader and orator of Bengal. About this time he delved deeper into the spiritual practices.

When the news of his spiritual practices reached Dindayal, the concerned father decided to marry his son off as per the prevailing customs in Bengal. According to his biographer Sarat Chandra Chakravarty, about his marriage Nagmahashaya used to say, "Marriage with the pure desire for progeny does not defile a man. But only saints and sages of yore were fit for such marriages. Having observed austere Brahmacharya (celibacy) for a long time, they took wives for the purpose of continuing their progeny; and having begot sons like Vyasa, Sukadeva, Sanaka and Sanatkumara, they retired to the forest to lead the life of a recluse. But it cannot be so in this Iron Age. Nowadays, there is not that deep meditation and self-restraint, and so, the children born of lust become wicked and immoral." About his second marriage, he said, "What could I do? It was my father's command! I had to obey it, although it was venom itself to me."

After their marriage, Nag Mahasaya and his father returned to Calcutta, where Nag Mahasaya established his medical practice and began accepting fees for patient treatment. Around this period, he experienced the loss of his aunt, marking his first encounter with bereavement. This incident profoundly impacted him, leading to a sense of disillusionment with material possessions. His biography reflects this transformation, stating, "With death all relationships cease, so why should there be all these 'I' and 'mine'? The world is full of suffering and misery, how can one ever be free from bondage?" These questions deeply troubled him.

In his medical practice, Nag Mahasaya did not demand fees but accepted whatever patients offered out of love and gratitude. His practice flourished as a result. Known for his simplicity in both outlook and attire, he avoided all forms of luxury. His primary concern was the welfare of the poor, often spending his earnings to aid them. On one occasion, when his father, Dindayal, purchased an expensive shawl for him, Nag Mahasaya donated it to a poor individual suffering from the cold. He also brought impoverished patients into his home to provide them with better treatment.

When his father became old and infirm he was sent away to stay in his native village and Nag Mahasaya's wife also went with him. Nag Mahasaya stayed back in Calcutta in a small cottage. During this time Suresh, the Brahmo friend, told Nag Mahasaya of a certain saint of Dakshineswar, who was none but Sri Ramakrishna. According to his biography, this was a major turning point in his life.

=== Meeting with Sri Ramakrishna ===
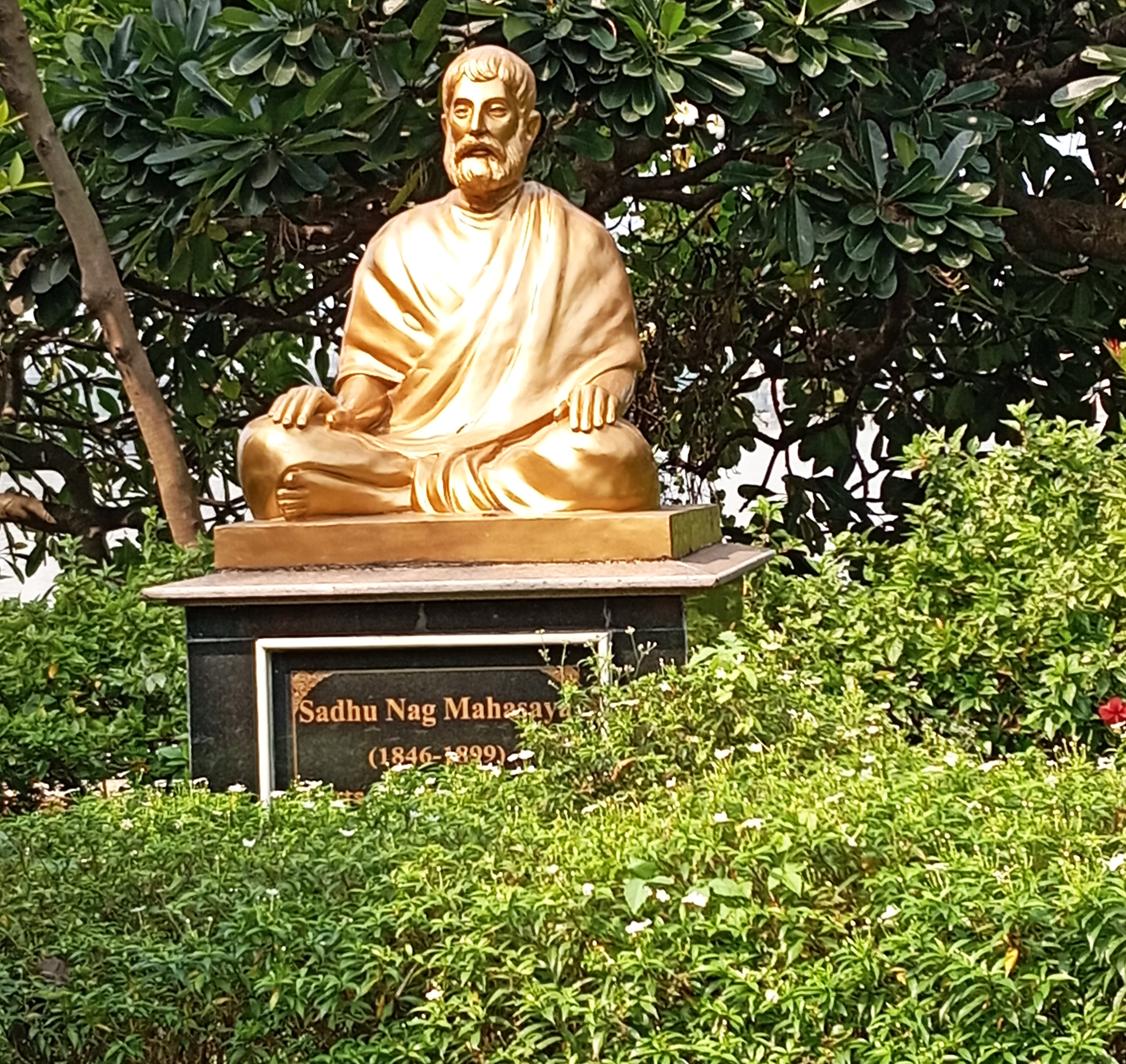
Statue of Durga Charan Nag (Nag Mahasay), Dakshineswar Kali Temple complex, North 24 Parganas, West Bengal, India

The initial encounter between Sri Ramakrishna and Nag Mahasaya is thoroughly documented in various sources, including Nag Mahasaya's biography and Swami Chetanananda's "They Lived with God." During this meeting, Suresh and Nag Mahasaya visited Sri Ramakrishna's residence. As detailed in the biography, Sri Ramakrishna inquired about Nag Mahasaya and, during their conversation, used the analogy of a pankal fish—a slippery freshwater fish in Bengal. He explained that, much like the pankal fish which resides in soil without being tainted by it, one should strive to live in the world without attachment to material possessions to avoid sorrow. Sri Ramakrishna also remarked to Suresh that Nag Mahasaya was "a blazing fire" and conveyed to Nag Mahasaya that he had achieved a very high spiritual state. According to the biography, this meeting had a profound and lasting impact on Nag Mahasaya.

Next time, Nag Mahasaya visited Dakshineswar alone and was treated very kindly by Sri Ramakrishna. According to the biography, Nag Mahasaya was overwhelmed by this visit and remarked about this incident later - "No one can realize Him unless blessed by Him. Even austere penances for a thousand years will be of no avail to realize Him, if He does not show mercy."

Nag Mahasaya also met Narendranath Dutta (Swami Vivekananda) in Dakshineswar and had a discussion with him. He had an extremely high regard for Swami Vivekananda. Sarat Chandra Chakravarty, who was a disciple of Swami Vivekananda, testified that the Swami also had tremendous respect for Nag Mahasaya.

Nag Mahasaya also met the noted Bengali poet and playwright Girish Chandra Ghosh in Dakshineswar, and they were lifelong friends.

==== Influence of Sri Ramakrishna ====
Nag Mahasaya got to hear a chance remark of Sri Ramakrishna that it was very difficult for a doctor or a lawyer to realize god. According to his biographer, because of this reason, he threw his box of medicine in the Ganges and gave up his practice. He was later employed by his father's employers, M/s Pals.

He asked Sri Ramakrishna for his permission to renounce worldly life. However, Sri Ramakrishna did not agree to this. According to the biography and other disciples of Ramakrishna who were also familiar with Nag Mahasaya, Sri Ramakrishna asked him to remain as a householder and lead a model life for all the householders.

==== Conversation with Sri Ramakrishna ====
A few excerpts are taken from a conversation between Sri Ramakrishna and Nag Mahasaya -

"Noticing Nagmahashaya's strong spirit of renunciation, and his desire to take to monastic life, Sri Ramakrishna told him once again, "Continue to be a householder and remain in your own home. Somehow or other the family will get its bare maintenance, you won't have to worry for it."

Nagmahashaya: How can one rem ain in the home? How can one remain unmoved even at the sight of others' sufferings and troubles?

Sri Ramakrishna: Well, I tell you, take my word. Nothing can taint you, even if you remain a householder. Men will wonder to see your life.

Nagmahashaya: How should I pass my days as a householder?

Sri Ramakrishna: You have not to do anything; only be always in the company of pious men.

Nagmahashaya: How am I to distinguish a pious man, unintelligent as I am?

Sri Ramakrishna: Oh no, you have not to search for them. You remain in your own house, and the truly pious men will of their own accord come to you."

==== Devotion towards Sri Ramakrishna ====
There are many stories around the love and devotion of Nag Mahasaya for Sri Ramakrishna. A few days before the master's death in Cossipore garden house, he by chance heard that Sri Ramakrishna, then terminally ill from throat cancer, had asked for an amalakee (Indian Gooseberry) fruit. He at once set out to fetch it, knowing fully well that it was not the season for that fruit. After a great deal of trouble, he finally got one and brought it for his Master when all others had failed to procure it.

=== Life as a householder ascetic ===
==== Practice of the Ascetic Life ====
During this period, Nag Mahasaya was more inclined towards an ascetic lifestyle rather than engaging in regular employment. Consequently, his employers arranged for his associate to manage his responsibilities in the salt dispatch business, with the condition that half of the profits from the business be allocated to Nag Mahasaya.

Nag Mahasaya was known for his egalitarian approach, serving individuals regardless of caste, creed, or social class. He paid the prices requested by shopkeepers without dispute, and even when some shopkeepers later offered to reimburse him out of remorse, he declined the payments, concerned about their financial losses. He also refrained from repairing his own house, believing that the inconvenience it would cause others was not worth it. One notable incident highlights his compassion: when his wife employed a laborer to repair their roof, Nag Mahasaya personally fanned the laborer and treated him with the utmost respect, as though he were an esteemed guest in his home.

For the last twenty years of his life, Nag Mahasaya came back and settled in his native place to look after his old father. Even though he was genial and non-violent, Nag Mahasaya could never withstand anybody criticising Sri Ramakrishna.

==== Relationship with his devotees ====
According to his biographer, Nag Mahasaya was deeply devoted to his followers, treating them with exceptional care and compassion. A notable example of his dedication to his guests is described in the biography: despite suffering from colic pain, he experienced a severe attack while hosting guests at his home. Even in this distressed state, he personally procured all necessary provisions to ensure his guests were well served. He consistently provided his guests with the best room available, and on one occasion, he and his wife spent a stormy night sitting and meditating under a porch.

Nag Mahasaya's income was modest, yet he dedicated a significant portion of it to welfare and service, leaving very little for himself or his family. His commitment to helping others led him to incur substantial debt.

==== Relationship with his wife ====
Among the devotees of Nag Mahasaya, his wife is notably prominent. According to Sarat Chandra Chakravarty, who was closely associated with the family, she was profoundly devoted to her husband's unconventional practices and revered him as a divine figure. She diligently attended to her household responsibilities while remaining attentive to both her husband and their guests. She rose early, well before others, and after completing her morning chores, she dedicated herself to worship and meditation. She consistently refrained from eating until her husband and the guests had finished their meals.

==== Meeting with Holy Mother, Sri Sarada Devi ====
He also met Sarada Devi, affectionately called Sri Ma or the holy mother by her devotees, who was the wife and spiritual consort of Sri Ramakrishna. According to Sarat Chandra Chakravarty, he held tremendous respect for the holy mother. "Mother is more merciful than father", he once told his biographer, who had accompanied him on a journey to visit the holy mother.

=== Testimonials ===
Swami Vivekananda held extremely high regards for Nag Mahasaya. An excerpt is taken here from the book "Diary of a Disciple" by Sarat Chandra Chakravarty, which illustrates the Swami's views on Nag Mahasaya. "Swamiji: Shri Ramakrishna used to compare him to King Janaka. A man with such control over all the senses one does not hear of even, much less come across. You must associate with him as much as you can. He is one of Shri Ramakrishna's nearest disciples.

"Many in our part of the country call him mad. But I have known him to be a great soul since the very first day of my meeting him. He loves me much, and I have his fervent blessings."

— Sarat Chandra Chakravarty, Diary of a Disciple,

According to the biography, the brother monks of Belur Math also loved him dearly. On one occasion when Nag Mahasaya went to the Alambazar Math at noon time when the shrine to the master was closed after the midday meal, one of his brother disciples Swami Ramakrishnananda who was very strict in observing rules regarding service to the Master, himself broke the rules for Nag Mahasaya. The shrine was opened in that unusual hour to offer food to the Master before serving Nag Mahasaya as the latter would accept only Prasad or the holy food partaken by the Master. Nag Mahashaya also had the highest reverence for his Sannyasin brother disciples. He used to say of them, "They are not men but gods in human forms who came to play with the Lord. Who can know them? Who can understand them?"

Girish Chandra Ghosh, the noted playwright of Bengal and a friend of Nag Mahasaya said that by constantly beating his ego Nag Mahasaya crushed it completely, so that it could never raise its head. It is mentioned in his biography and several other sources of literature dealing with the disciples of Sri Ramakrishna that he was humility personified.

== Legacy ==
=== Compassion and Kindness ===
There are many incidents in his biography narrating his kindness and compassion for others. During the plague epidemic in Calcutta which took place in 1898, Nag Mahasaya nursed his own cook who fell ill and then carried him to the Ganges alone as per the last wish of the man even at the risk of his own life. He had once been paid an amount for his return journey in a steamer when he went to see a patient. On his way back, he saw a beggar woman in a most pitiable condition and gave away the entire amount to her and walked barefoot all the way back to Calcutta. On another occasion after a hard day's work he earned some money which he instantly gave away to another man in misery when he heard his sad story, and himself he went without food. He would often say, "Abstinence from lust and greed brings a man near to God."

Nag Mahasaya extended his compassion to animals and birds, often feeding them by hand. His biography recounts an incident where he confronted two Europeans who had come to hunt birds, compelling them to leave without pursuing their hunt. Additionally, there is a legend that he once implored a cobra with folded hands to leave his backyard and return to the jungle, as opposed to allowing it to be killed as others wished; reportedly, the cobra complied with his plea.

Nag Mahasaya often articulated his belief that "the outside world is the projection of your own mind," likening it to a mirror reflecting the faces one makes at it. He held the conviction that the one God resides within the heart of all creatures and that "all live, move, and have their being in Him." When asked about his habit of keeping his palms folded, he explained that he perceived his personal God everywhere and in every being, making it impossible for him to harm even a single leaf from a living plant.

=== His Quotes ===
About worship, he used to say - "Lord is verily the Kalpataru - the wish-fulfilling tree. He gives whatever is asked of Him. But man should not indulge in such desires which will drag him again into the rounds of births and deaths. He must pray to the Lord to grant him unflinching devotion to His hallowed feet and a true knowledge of His self. Then only can he break through the sordid bonds of the world and attain freedom through His grace. Hankering after worldly ends must bring in its attendant evils."

About supernatural powers he would say - "When a man becomes pure and truly spiritual, temptations of a subtler kind such as some occult or miraculous power or some sudden attainment of prosperity try to allure him continually. A pure soul has not got to reason out the truth of objects. He intuitively knows everything; for as the pure crystal catches the reflection of all objects about it, the pure mind comprehends the things of the world in their entirety. But should those powers attract his attention, there is every chance of his being led away from the ideal."

Nag Mahasaya who did not have any narrowness with respect to religions or caste, used to say, "In the kingdom of God there is no distinction of caste or creed. All are equal in His eyes. Those who surrender themselves at the feet of the Lord, by whatever name they may call Him, in whatever form they may meditate on Him -- if they can do that with a sincere and devoted heart, they will surely get the grace of the Almighty. The numerous paths or creeds are numerous ways to reach the same kingdom of God. They are all effective, provided one follows them with a sincere heart and a resolute mind."

== Death ==
Nag Mahasaya died in 1899 in a condition of abject poverty and indebtedness. Sarat Chandra Chakravarty who witnessed his death mentions that even on his deathbed it was his prime concern to serve his guests who came to see him and to talk about Sri Ramakrishna. Swami Saradananda, a leading monk of the Ramakrishna Order and a brother disciple who at this time was in Dacca also came to see him. Apparently, Nag Mahasaya also selected the precise date and time of his departure.

The last moments of his life are documented in the book "Life of Nag Mahasaya" by Sarat Chandra Chakravarty.

His last words were, "Grace, grace, grace out of Thine own boundless mercy."

After his death, a photograph was taken of his body which is now reproduced in all writings related to him.

== External ==
- Complete Works of Swami Vivekananda
- "The Integral Yoga, Sri Aurobindo's teaching and method of practice" by Sri Aurobindo
- "They Lived with God :Life Stories of some devotees of Sri Ramakrishna" by Swami Chetanananda, chapter 15
- Gospels of Holy Mother, http://saradadevi.info/GHM_book/p-293.html
- Nag Mahashay in vedantauk
- M., the Apostle and the Evangelist, volume 2, by Swami Nityatmananda (Bengali - Sri Ma Darshan)
- ramkrishnavivekananda.info
- "Diary of a Disciple" by Sarat Chandra Chakrabarti
- RKM Nagpur
- Lay Disciples of Sri Ramakrishna
