= Surendra Verma (science writer) =

Indian Australian science writer

Surendra Verma (born 1942) is an Indian-Australian journalist and writer of science books for a popular audience.

== Early life and education ==
Verma was born in India in 1942. He has been working in Melbourne, Australia since 1970.

== Career ==
Verma has written a number of book which explain scientific topics to a general audience. Verma's books have received positive reviews, and have been published in Australia, UK, US and India and have been translated into 14 languages.

== Books ==
- The Tunguska Fireball: Solving One of the Greatest Mysteries of the 20th Century (Icon Books, UK; 2005) ISBN 978-1-84046-620-1
- Why Aren't They Here?: The Questions of Life on Other Worlds (Icon Books, UK; 2007)ISBN 9781840468069
- The Cause of Mosquitoes' Sorrow: Beginnings, Blunders and Breakthroughs in Science (Icon Books, UK, 2007)ISBN 9781840468311
- The Little Book of Scientific Principles, Theories & Things (New Holland Publishers, Australia; 2005) ISBN 9781877069208
- The Little Book of Maths Theorems, Theories & Things (New Holland Publishers, Australia; 2008)ISBN 9781741106718
- The Little Book of Unscientific Proportions, Theories & Things (New Holland Publishers, Australia; 2011)ISBN 9781742570778
- The Little Book of the Mind: How We Think and Why We Think (New Holland Publishers, Australia; 2012)ISBN 9781742572130 + a children's book
- Who Killed T. Rex: Uncover the mystery of the vanished dinosaurs (New Holland Publishers, Australia; 2010)ISBN 9781741108248
- Learn & Unlearn: The novel way to rethink the things that matter in life (New Holland Publishers, Australia; 2015)ISBN 9781742575964.
- Little-Big Book of Science in 100 Words (Orient Publishing, India; 2015) ISBN 9788122205923
