= Balaram Bose =

Indian householder (1842–1890)

- Born: December 1842; North Calcutta, British India (present-day Kolkata, West Bengal, India)
- Died: 13 April 1890 (aged 47); Calcutta, Bengal, British India (now Kolkata, West Bengal)
- Occupation: Foremost householder disciple of Sri Ramakrishna
- Spouse: Krishnabhamini Devi
- Children: Ramakrishna Bose (son)
- Relatives: Baburam Maharaj (Swami Premananda)
- Writing career
- Language: Bengali
- Period: 19th century
- Literary movement: Bengal Renaissance, Ramakrishna

Balaram Bose (December 1842 – 13 April 1890) was one of the prominent householder disciples of Ramakrishna Paramahamsa. He was the son of Radhamohan Bose. He is often referred in The Gospel of Sri Ramakrishna. Ramakrishna often visited his house and participated in kirtana and other devotional functions. Sri Maa Sarada Devi and some other devotees of the master, including Swami Adbhutananda lived in the house of Balaram Bose after the master's death. He was a great philanthropist and donated regularly to government and civilian organizations.

== Biography ==
=== Early life ===
Bose was born in a very prominent Vaishnavite family of North Calcutta whose ancestral seat was in Hooghly District. His father was Radhamohan Bose. His grandfather Guruprasad Bose established a Radha Shyam temple in his house and because of that, the section of the area became known as Shyam Bazar in Calcutta. His residence in north Kolkata, where Swami Vivekananda founded the Ramakrishna Mission on 1 May 1897, is presently known as the Balaram Mandir. The place has been sanctified by the numerous visits of Sri Ramakrishna, his disciples, and Holy Mother Sri Sarada Devi. Bose's extended family of his uncles had estates in several parts of India, esp. in the Balasore region of Orissa. His cousins Nimaicharan and Hariballav Bose were the custodians of the ancestral property, and they provided him with an allowance. Balaram was intensely spiritual since his early days, and he spent considerable time in his younger days in Puri. Fearing that he would become an ascetic, his cousins and father made him come back to Calcutta and put him up in a house in Baghbazar area. Balaram was married to Krishnabhavini Devi who was likewise spiritual minded, and they had two daughters and a son.

=== Influence of Sri Ramakrishna ===
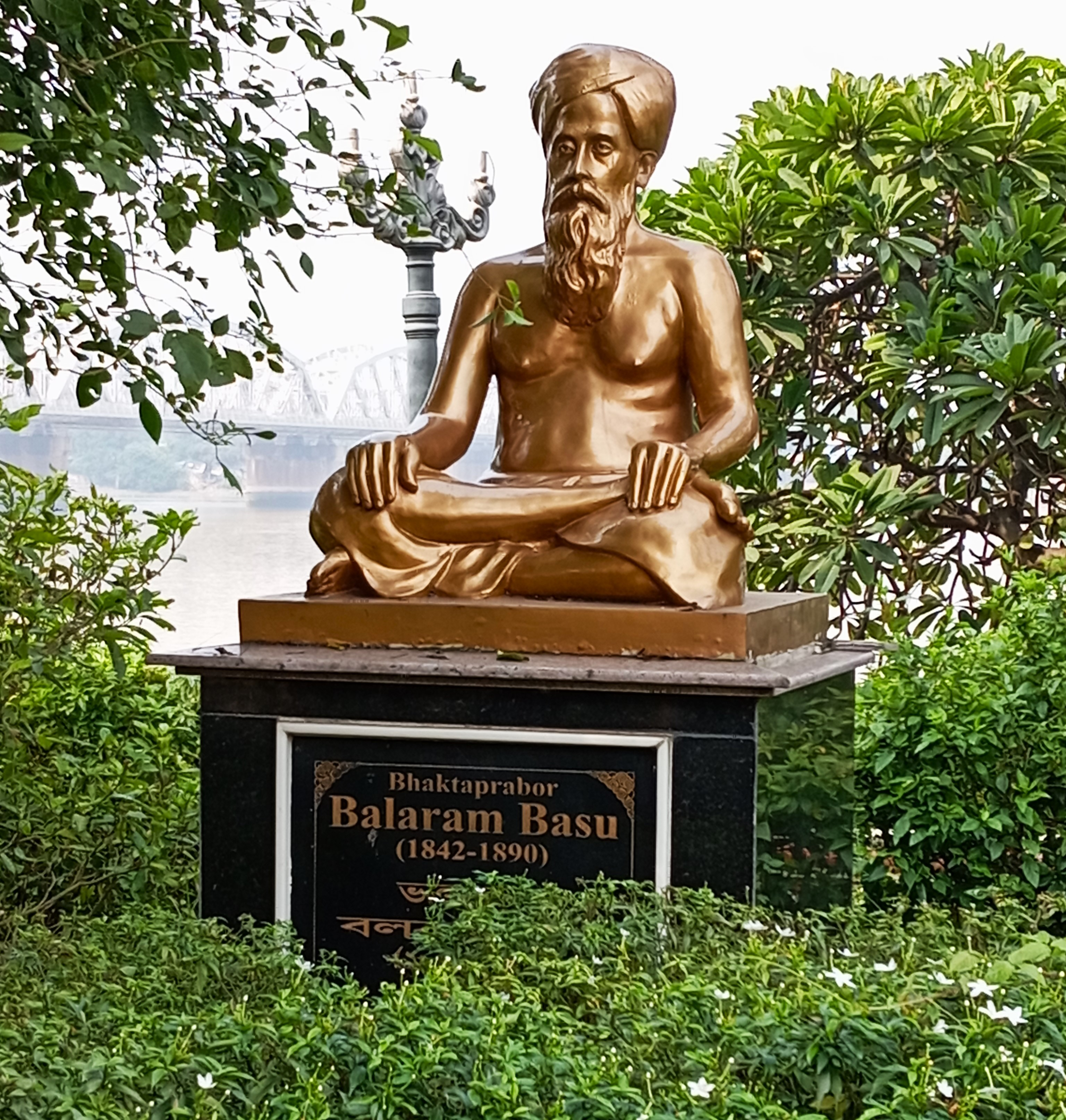
Statue of Balaram Bose, Dakshineswar Kali Temple complex, North 24 Parganas, West Bengal, India

Bose met Sri Ramakrishna for the first time in 1881 and apparently had asked him if God exists."Certainly he does", came the response. Sri Ramakrishna regarded Balaram Bose as one of the principal suppliers of the mother, implying that Balaram provided bulk of the food, clothing and other items for serving the devotees and the God. In The Gospel of Sri Ramakrishna it is recorded that Sri Ramakrishna saw Balaram in a vision, as part of a huge procession of the followers of Sri Gauranga or Sri Chaitanya in a sankirtan or song and dance in praise of the divinity along with lord Sri Chaitanya himself.

After his first meeting with Sri Ramakrishna, Balaram became a lifelong devotee. His entire family was intensely spiritual. His wife Krishna Bhavini was very dedicated to Sri Ramakrishna and the holy mother, and she was also the sister of Swami Premananda, a direct monastic disciple of Sri Ramakrishna who later came to be known as swami Premananda. Sri Ramakrishna often used to go to Balaram's house on holy occasions, where he used to be in spiritual ecstasy. An account has been made of his stay in The Gospel of Sri Ramakrishna on the occasion of the rathayatra or the car festival of lord Jagannath. Sri Ramakrishna also spent several days in Balaram's house during his illness, when his devotees shifted him to Calcutta for better treatment.

Balaram also named his only son after Ramakrishna.

After the death of the Master, Balaram would provide a small amount for his monastic brother disciples in Baranagar Math. Despite the fact that he was not well off and did not have any regular income of his own and that he depended on the sustenance provided by the family estate, he never shied away from serving Sri Ramakrishna and his devotees and followers.

Holy mother of Ramakrishna Order, Sri Sarada Devi, also stayed in Balaram Bose's house for sometime while staying in Calcutta.

We get a picture of absolute humility and complete surrender from M's The Gospel of Sri Ramakrishna in the incident where he was waiting patiently outside the house for the Master to finish his conversation with Vidyasagar for several hours, without making any endeavour to disturb the Master.

=== Legacy ===
There is a street in Calcutta named after Balaram Bose, called Balaram Bose Ghat Road. His ancestral house, affectionately called Balaram Mandir, is now under the ownership of Ramakrishna Mission. His ancestral house is now called Balaram Mandir. It was here that the Ramakrishna Mission Association was born- Swami Vivekananda held the historic meeting on 1 May 1897 to finalize his plan for founding the Association in the name of his Master. Many direct disciples of Sri Ramakrishna, including Swami Vivekananda, Swami Brahmananda, Swami Turiyananda, Swami Premananda, Swami Akhandananda and Swami Adbhutananda stayed in Balaram Mandir. The Holy Mother Sri Sarada Devi also stayed in Balaram Mandir. There is a small shrine dedicated to Lord Jagannath inside the temple. There is also the chariot of Lord Jagannath which was pulled by Sri Ramakrishna on a Ratha Yatra (car festival) day. The Gadadhar Ashrama, now under Ramakrishna Mission, in Bhawanipur area of Calcutta, began in the memory of one of his grandsons.
