= Baburam Maharaj (Swami Premananda) =

Disciple of Ramakrishna

Premananda
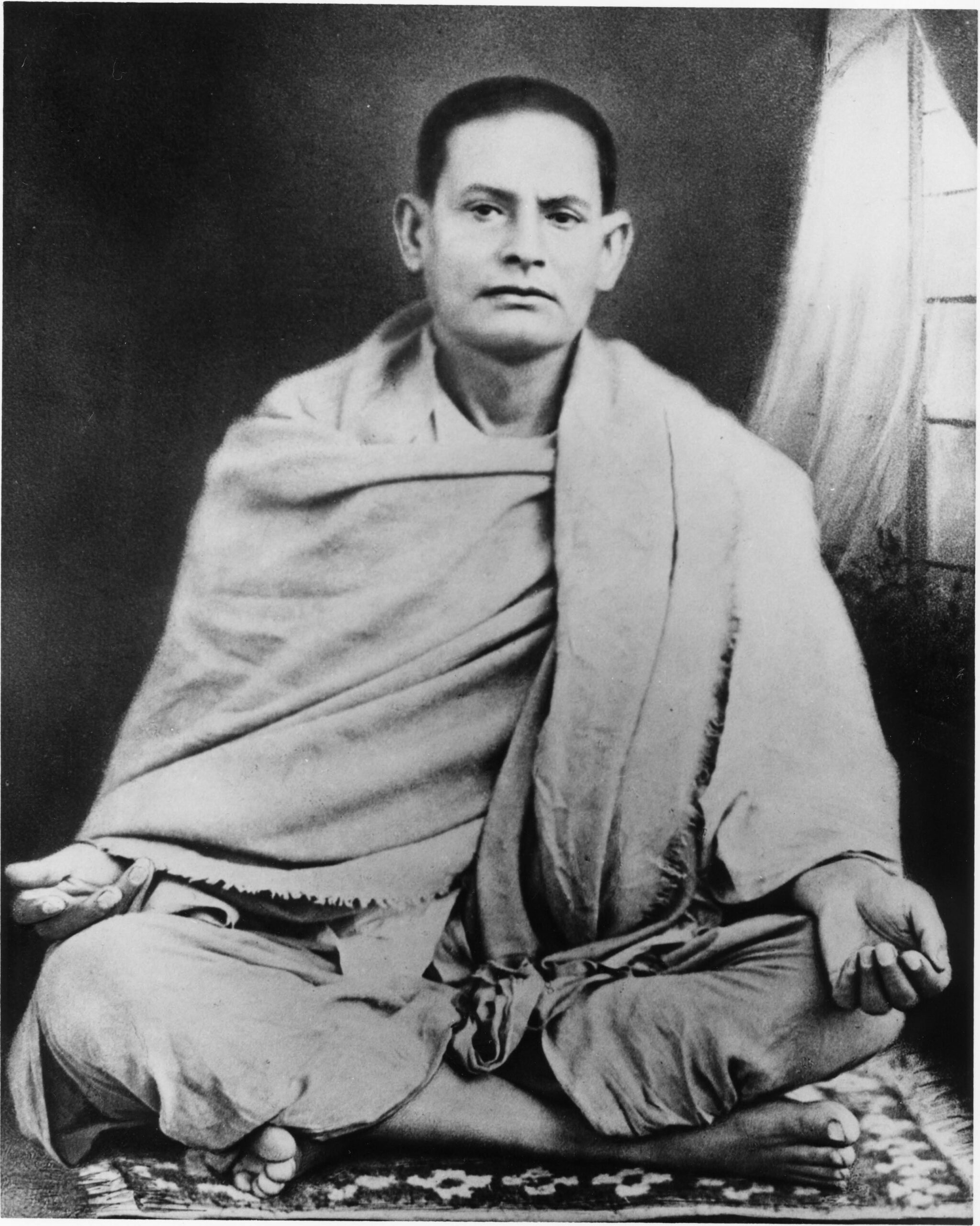
- Premananda (Baburam Maharaj), direct disciple of Ramakrishna and one of the founder monks of Ramakrishna Mission

Personal life
- Born: Baburam Ghosh; 10 December 1861 Antpur, Hooghly District, Bengal Presidency, British India
- Died: 30 July 1918 (aged 56) Calcutta, Bengal Presidency, British India

Religious life
- Religion: Hinduism
- Philosophy: Advaita Vedanta

Religious career
- Teacher: Ramakrishna Paramahansa

Quotation

Can one become a great devotee of God simply by dancing and jumping or by quoting plentifully from the scriptures? What is wanted is freedom from selfishness – freedom from egotism... Mere talk will not do, this is an age of action.

Baburam Maharaj (Swami Premananda) (Bengali: বাবুরাম মহারাজ; 10 December 1861 – 30 July 1918) was a direct disciple of Ramakrishna, the 19th-century saint and mystic from Bengal, India. He was born in Antpur in the Hoogly district of Bengal in the year 1861. Baburam, as he was called in his pre monastic days, was also related to Balaram Bose, a leading householder disciple of Ramakrishna. He was given the name of Premananda or "joy of divine love" by his brother disciple Vivekananda. He had a notable contribution during the initial days of Ramakrishna Mission as he managed the whole affairs of Belur Math from 1902 to 1916. He also mentored young spiritual aspirants.

== Biography ==
=== Early life ===
Baburam Ghosh was born to parents Taraprasanna and Matangini Ghosh on 10 December 1861 in the Antpur (Bengali:আঁটপুর) village in the Hoogly district of Bengal. His sister Krishnabhamini was married to Balaram Bose, a leading householder disciple of Ramakrishna. From his early childhood, his ideal was to renounce family life and live a monastic life. After graduating from the local village school, Baburam came to Calcutta for higher studies. He studied in the Metropolitan Institution in Shyampukur, which was owned by Iswar Chandra Vidyasagar and whose headmaster was Mahendranath Gupta also known as "M", the author of the Sri Sri Ramakrishna Kathamrita or The Gospel of Sri Ramakrishna. In this school his batchmate was Rakhal or Brahmananda, who later became the first president of the Ramakrishna Mission, and who was another direct disciple as well as "spiritual son" of Ramakrishna. These contacts enabled Baburam to come in close contact with Ramakrishna, and he was drawn to his teachings.

=== Ramakrishna's influence ===
Baburam accompanied Rakhal to Dakshineswar temple to meet Ramakrishna. He also met Vivekananda, who at that time was known as Narendranath Dutta. After a few more visits to Dakshineswar Baburam came directly under Ramakrishna's influence who also held him in high esteem. At that time, Baburam was only twenty years. Ramakrishna said to his disciples that Baburam is pure to his very marrow, no impure thought can ever cross his mind.

This association apparently led to the neglect of his studies, and he failed to clear his entrance examination. In 1885, Ramakrishna was diagnosed to have developed throat cancer, and was shifted to Calcutta for better treatment, first to Shyampukur and then to Cossipore Garden house. Baburam was one of the constant attendants on the master, along with his other brother disciples, including Rakhal and Narendra, and this continued till the death of his master in August 1886. This event brought the brother disciples in close contact on a shared goal and paved the way for the establishment of the first Math in Baranagar, under the leadership of Narendranath (Vivekananda).

=== Beginning of monastic life ===
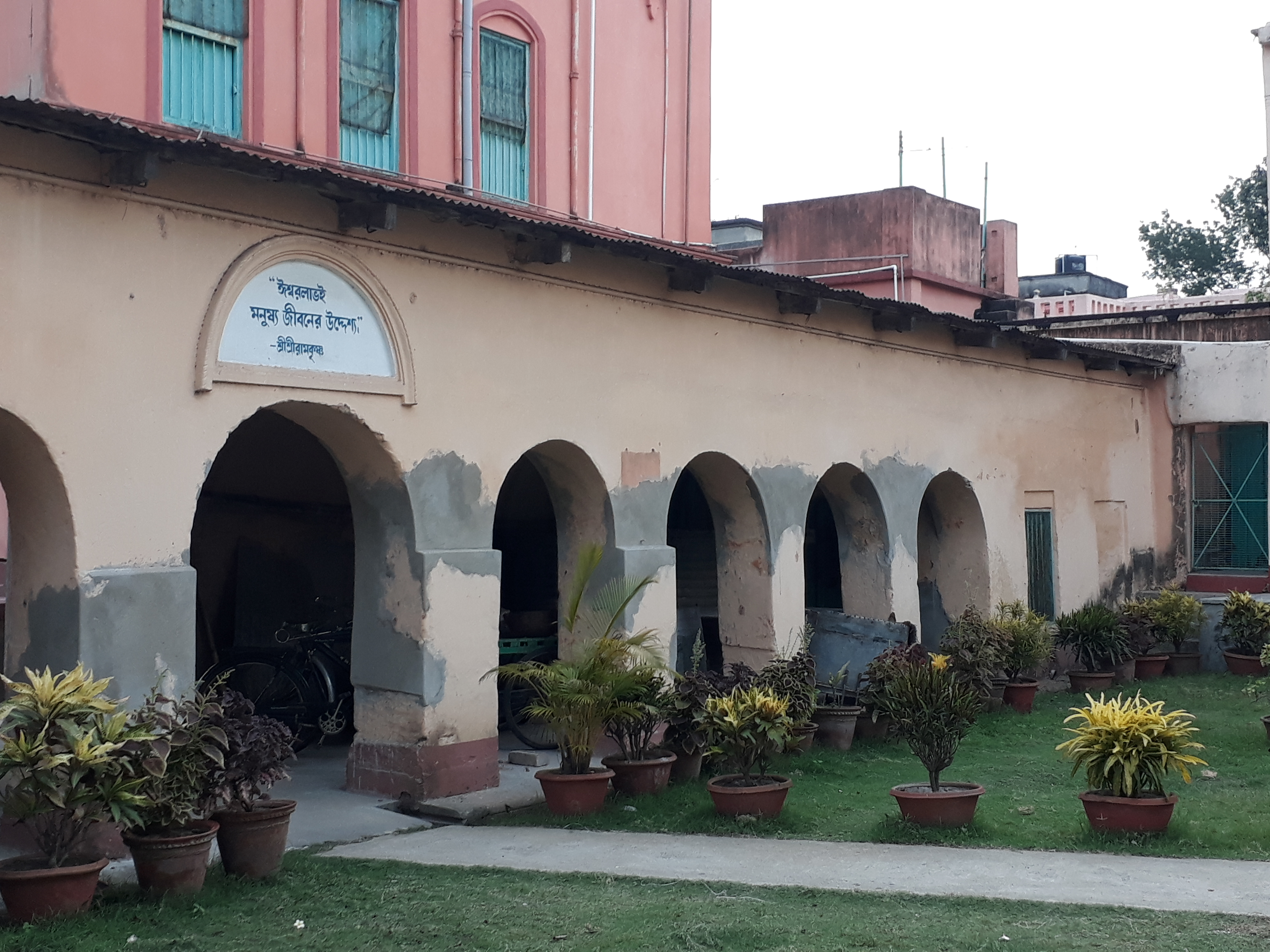
House of Swami Premananda presently Antpur Ramkrishna Math at Antpur

In December 1886, the brother disciples visited Baburam's ancestral house in Antpur. Immediately after returning from there, they took the vow of renunciation from Narendranath. Vivekananda, as he came to be known later, gave the name of "Premananda" to Baburam. Upon Ramakrishnananda's departure to Madras, Premananda took up the responsibility of daily worship of the Master. He went for a pilgrimage to Northern India and returned on the eve of establishment of the Ramakrishna Math in Belur, known as Belur Math, which was the headquarters of the Ramakrishna Mission.

=== Management of Belur Math ===
After the demise of Vivekananda in 1902, Swami Brahmananda, the then president of Ramakrishna Mission, entrusted Premananda with the duty of the management of the day-to-day affairs of the Math at Belur which included the daily worship, the introduction and initiation of young celibates and monks, receiving of the devotees and guests, various administrative activities etc. He was very kind and compassionate towards all and sundry. He would himself cook for devotees visiting the Math at odd hours and took all troubles for their comfort. For this he came to be known as the "mother of the Math". He used to consider the service of the devotees as worship of God.

Premananda also introduced a study circle to learn Sanskrit in Belur Math under the tutelage of a competent teacher. He also encouraged the study of other subjects, like Western Philosophy. He also laid great emphasis on the education of women and wrote to a lady, "Let thousands of Niveditas come out of Bengal... let there arise anew in the land numbers of Gargis, Lilavatis, Sitas and Savitris. What better thing is there in this world than learning!" He lived an unostentatious life, free of luxuries and excesses. His personal belongings included only a few books and a canvas bag.

There is a dormitory named, in his honour, Premananda Dham in Ramakrishna Mission Vidyapith, Deoghar.

=== Travels ===
After about 6 years of service in Math, he set out for a pilgrimage to Amarnath in 1910 in the company of Shivananda (Mahapurush Maharaj) and Turiyananda (Hari Maharaj). On his return he travelled to different parts of Bengal spreading the message of Ramakrishna. He was particularly very popular in East Bengal and inspired the youth there for community and charitable work.

=== Relationship with Sarada Devi ===
Premananda had free access to the Holy Mother of the Ramakrishna Order, Sarada Devi. She was very fond of him, and he was very devoted to her. He once said that those who differentiated between her and the Master would never make any spiritual progress; she and the Master were like the two sides of the same coin. In the course of a discussion at Belur Math, he said to the devotees: "We have seen that she had a much greater capacity than the Master. She was the embodiment of power, and how well she controlled it! Ramakrishna could not do so, though he tried."

=== Legacy and death ===
During his later sojourn in several parts of Bengal, especially in East Bengal, he inspired the youth to be useful to the society by voluntary service. Though a man of high spiritual attainments, he was wont to hiding them and reticent in giving expression to them. He was admired by young and old devotees for his love, kindness and tenderness towards all and sundry. The long trips took a toll on his health and he fell victim to Kala azar, a deadly fever. He also suffered from influenza and died on 30 July 1918.

=== Teachings ===
- To follow the Master means to practise what he taught; otherwise, nobody can advance by just offering to him a few flowers or through some momentary sentimental outbursts.
- Can one become a great devotee of God simply by dancing and jumping or by quoting plentifully from the scriptures? What is wanted is freedom from selfishness – freedom from egotism... Mere talk will not do, this is an age of action.
- Not mere theory; actualise it – there has been enough talk and writing. Put the books aside and let your actions speak. This is what the lives of the Master and Swamiji stand for.
- The poor, the weak, the fallen, the ignorant – all these you have to make your own. And yet I warn you, that in loving one section of society you must not become hateful of the other, the rich.
