= Adhar Sen =

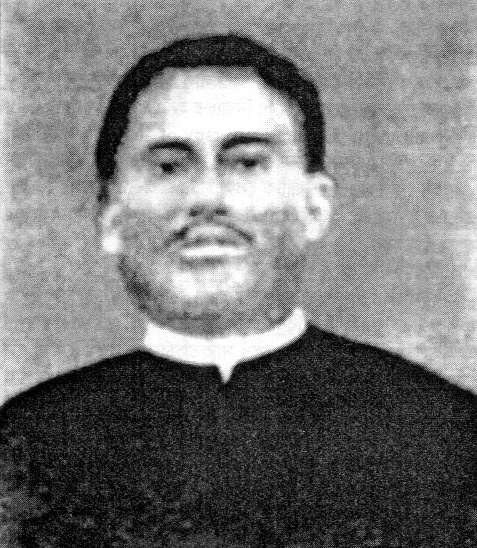
Adhar Lal Sen

Adhar Lal Sen (1855-1885) was a householder disciple of Ramakrishna, the 19th century mystic saint from Bengal, and had a prominent place amongst the early devotees of Sri Ramakrishna. He had an extraordinary academic record. He lived in Beniatola street of Calcutta and graduated from Presidency College. He was a deputy magistrate by profession and also a member of the faculty of Calcutta University. He was also an accomplished poet in Bengali language. He died very young, before age thirty.

== Biography ==
=== Early life ===
Adhara Sen was born on 2 March 1855 in Ahiritola, Calcutta to Ramgopal Sen and wife. He was married in 1867 and throughout his life had an extraordinary academic record. He got Duff scholarship in English literature. He graduated from Presidency College in 1877. He was also an accomplished writer at this period, having written two books of Bengali poems, published in 1874 when he was only nineteen years old - Lalita Sundari and Menaka. Two more books were published soon after - Nalini and Kusum Kanan, which won positive reviews from the literary circle. In 1880, he translated the poem, "The wanderer" by Lord Lytton, a viceroy of India. Even though he belonged to a religious family, he was influenced by Christianity, like many of his contemporaries. He was also greatly impressed by Brahmo Samaj and its teachings.

=== Professional life ===
In 1879 Adhar became a deputy magistrate posted in Chittagong district of Bengal (now Bangladesh), considered a high ranking post among the natives under the British rule. He was only 24 at this time. He went to Sitakunda (now in Bangladesh) and was inspired by the serenity and solitude of the place to write a paper on its spiritual significance, which he read in 1881 in a meeting of the Royal Asiatic Society. He was transferred to Jessore district in 1880 and in 1882 he moved to Calcutta. He was closely acquainted with the greatest names of Bengali literature at that time, viz. Bankim Chandra Chattopadhyay, Haraprasad Shastri and Krishnadas Pal. At this stage he came under the influence of Gaudiya Vaishnavism and read Chaitanya Charitamrita and Chaitanya Bhagavat. In March 1884 he was appointed a member of the faculty of Arts, Calcutta University. He also wanted to become the vice chairman of Calcutta corporation but could not get the post.

=== Sri Ramakrishna's influence ===
Adhar first met Sri Ramakrishna on March 9, 1883, as per recorded in The Gospels of Sri Ramakrishna by Sri M (Mahendranath Gupta). He had asked Sri Ramakrishna if one could see God, and the latter answered in affirmative, saying that it is possible to see God both as formless and with form. Sri Ramakrishna also recognized Adhara as belonging to his inner circle of devotees. In his subsequent visit, Adhar took his friend Saradacharan and witnessed for the first time the master going into ecstasy. He was told by Sri Ramakrishna, You have your position through the grace of God, do not forget Him, we stay in the world only for a couple of days. One must have strong determination, then alone is spiritual practice possible. This remark assumed significance because Adhar died only 18 months later. Adhar invited Sri Ramakrishna to his house and arranged for festivals including sankirtans or devotional songs. Under Sri Ramakrishna's instruction, he engaged the famous devotional singer of the time Baishnabcharan for recitals in his house on a daily basis.

He used to often go to Dakshineswar in a hired carriage, spending a lot of money to meet Sri Ramakrishna and listen to his teachings. But he would hear very little of what Sri Ramakrishna said. Being very tired he would lie down on a mat spread on the floor, which was arranged for him by the Master, and would soon fall asleep. Sri Ramakrishna also visited Adhar's house on several occasions, on the request of the latter and also as a spontaneous gesture.

On 14 July 1883 Sri Ramakrishna first went to Adhar's house. He also paid an unexpected visit on 21 July 1883. He gave initiation to Adhar on 18 August 1883. After becoming a member of the faculty of Calcutta University, Adhar could not visit the Master as frequently as before. He expressed to Sri Ramakrishna his earnest desire to become the vice chairman of the Calcutta municipal corporation, for which he was considered. Although the master advised him to be satisfied with what he had got, Sri Ramakrishna nevertheless requested to one of his influential devotees for considering Adhar for the position.

Sri Ramakrishna also went to Adhar's house as part of the Durga Puja celebrations. He also took part in feasts which were arranged by Adhar in his house for the devotees of Sri Ramakrishna and in one of this visits the Master taught his devotees to transcend caste barriers. On 6 December 1884 Sri Ramakrishna met Bankim Chandra Chattopadhyay, the famous Bengali writer and composer of the national song of India, Vande Mataram, in Adhar's house. Sri Ramakrishna came to visit Adhar during his last days in January 1885 and also wept when he died.

=== Death ===
On 6 January 1885 he went to inspect Maniktolla distillery and while returning home he fell from the horseback and broke his arm. Soon the wound developed into tetanus, and he died on 14 January 1885.
