= Gauri Ma =

Indian activist

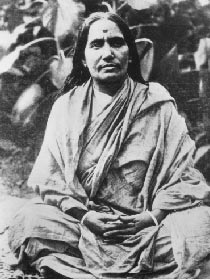
- Ma c. 1900
- Born: February 1857; Shibpur, Howrah, British India
- Died: 1 March 1938 (aged 81)

Gauri Ma (February 1857 Shibpur, Howrah, British India – 1 March 1938), born Mridani, was a prominent Indian disciple of Ramakrishna, companion of Sarada Devi and founder of Kolkata's Saradeswari Ashram.

== Early life ==
Gauri Ma was born in Sibpur, Howrah, India. Even as a child she possessed a strong tendency toward Hindu spirituality. By her thirteenth year, Gauri Ma had developed a distaste for marriage, telling her mother, "I shall marry only that bridegroom who is immortal," meaning she wished to marry Krishna and no other.

When Gauri Ma was young she had received from a yogini a stone image of Sri Krishna. The yogini told her, "This image of God is my all in all and is alive with Divine energy. He has fallen in love with you, so I am handing him over to you. My child, worship him. It will do good to you." Gauri Ma accepted the gift and took the image of Sri Krishna as her husband. For the rest of her life she carried the stone image with her and served him lovingly. Gauri Ma received initiation from Sri Ramakrishna at an early age in Ghola.

In 1875, Gauri Ma left with relatives and neighbours to go on pilgrimage to Gangasagar. On the third day of her stay, she disappeared into a crowd of pilgrims, disguising herself as a sadhvi to evade recognition. She began travelling by train and on foot to holy sites and monasteries throughout India. During her years of pilgrimage Gauri Ma practised severe austerities such as fasting, observing silence, and long hours of meditation. She also spent a great deal of time studying the Hindu scriptures.

== Ramakrishna and Sarada Devi ==
Gauri Ma lived as a companion to Sarada Devi, the wife of Ramakrishna, whenever she was at Dakshineswar. Gauri Ma also sometimes cooked for her Guru Ramakrishna, and sang to him. Ramakrishna had a very high opinion of her, declaring, "Gauri is a perfect soul – a gopi of Vrindavan."

While Gauri Ma was living at Dakshineswar, Sri Ramakrishna gave her the ochre robes of a sannyasini and made arrangements for the accompanying rituals. Sri Ramakrishna himself offered a bilva leaf into the homa fire. Prior to this, Gauri Ma had worn a sannyasini's robes as an external sign of renunciation, but she had not taken any formal vows. After this ritual, he gave her a new name Gauriananda. Sri Ramakrishna usually called her Gauri or Gauridasi, and some people called her Gaurma. But Gauri Ma was the name by which she was generally known.

Ramakrishna encouraged Gauri Ma to settle down from her life of pilgrimage and devote herself to working for the betterment of women in India. The women of India's plight was great, and Ramakrishna wished her to work to improve their education and development, both intellectually and spiritually. Gauri Ma protested, that she had neither the proper training nor education for such a feat. Ramakrishna replied, "I am pouring the water. You knead the clay."

Swami Vivekananda echoed Ramakrishna's praise for Gauri Ma stating, "Where is Gauri Ma? We want a thousand such mothers with that noble stirring spirit." Gauri Ma was gently reminded by Sarada Devi, "The Master (Ramakrishna) said that your life was meant for serving women – the living goddess."

== Saradeswari Ashram ==
In 1895, the Saradeswari Ashram was started by Gauri Ma. Residence, board and instruction were free to unmarried, married and widowed women. Village girls also came in the afternoon. After returning from his first visit to the United States, Swami Vivekananda visited the ashram and told Gauri Ma, "I have talked to the western people about you, and shall take you there and show them what the type of women India can produce."

Swami Vivekananda wrote, "There is no chance for the welfare of the world unless the condition of women is improved. It is not possible for a bird to fly on only one wing. Hence, in the Ramakrishna incarnation, the acceptance of woman as the Guru, hence his practising in the women's garb and attitude, hence too his preaching the Motherhood of women as the representations of the Divine Mother. Hence it is my first endeavour to start a math (convent) for women. This math shall be the origin of Gargis and Maitreyis and women of even higher attainments than these... (Letters of Vivekananda) Please show this letter to Gauri Ma, Jogin M, etc., and through them establish a women's math. Let Gaur Ma be the President there...I shall supply all the necessary expenses for that work also." (Letter from England 1896).

In 1911, the Ashram moved to Kolkata. Sarada Devi often visited the ashram, serving as an inspiration to those who were living there. For thirteen years, the ashram was located in rented houses, moving four times to accommodate its growing population. After raising funds, in 1924 a three-story permanent ashram was constructed at its present location. The sannyasinis of Saradeswari Ashram wear traditional red bordered sari and also wear Shankhaa (a conch bangle which represents a married Bengali woman), because Sri Sarada devi didn't like women living like sanyassins and wearing ochre, therefore Gauri Ma initiated the ritual of marrying the ashramite sannyasinis with Shaligram narayan or Jagannath ji, so that they can live like married women. Gauri Ma followed Vedic traditions of women taking up sanyasa and worshipping by being priestess, therefore in Saradeswari ashram all worship rituals are done by the sanyassini matajis of the order.

== Educational ideas ==
Gauri Ma thought getting an education was a national duty. She taught that if the training of women was neglected, the whole nation would suffer. A mother's intelligence, love and insight nurture the child. The Saradeswari Ashram, therefore, pursued programs of education that strove for the regeneration of womankind.

Gauri Ma carefully selected teachers for the ashram who lived ideal lives of simplicity and purity, of high thinking, and who dedicated themselves to the cause of women. The Saradeswari Ashram had four purposes: to promote education among women in accordance with the ideals of Hinduism and society; to organize women to serve as workers for the Ashram; to provide shelter to girls and widows belonging to respectable families who were in indigent circumstances; and to support women in their efforts to live decent and virtuous lives.
