= Dwijesh Dutta Majumdar =

Dwijesh Dutta Majumder
- Born: 10 February 1932; Dharmaghar District, Sylhet, British India
- Died: 27 June 2020 (aged 88); Kolkata, India
- Education: Rajabazar Science College (University of Calcutta)
- Spouse: Dr. Sabita Dutta Majumder (deceased Feb 2008)
- Children: 3
- Scientific career
- Fields: Computer Science (Pattern Recognition, Knowledge-based computing)
- Workplaces: Indian Statistical Institute

Dwijesh Kumar Dutta Majumder INSA (10 February 1932 – 27 June 2020) was professor emeritus in the Computer and Communication Sciences Division of the Indian Statistical Institute, Kolkata and Honorary Director-Secretary of the Institute of Cybernetics Systems and Information Technology in the same city. Additionally, he was an emeritus Scientist on the Council of Scientific & Industrial Research, operated by the Government of India.

== Life and career ==
Dwijesh Kumar Dutta Majumder obtained a BSc (Hons) in physics honors (1952) with a First Class First distinction from Guwahati University before studying at the Rajabazar Science College, University of Calcutta, where he was awarded an MSc (Tech.) in 1955 and a PhD in 1962–1963 in Radiophysics and Electronics.

Dutta Majumder worked for the Computer Development and Research Division of the Indian Statistical Institute (ISI) and there helped to develop magnetic memory systems and other digital electronic circuits. In particular, he had a role in building the first solid state transistorised computer in India, which was called ISI-JU-1.

In 1964, Dutta Majumder visited the University of Michigan, USA, to work with N. R. Scott on computer system design, pattern recognition and problems related to both computer and human memory, He was awarded a UNDP Fellowship for this purpose.

Upon his return to India after his post-doctoral fellowship in the United States, Dutta Majumder subsequently became Head of the Electronics and Communication Sciences Unit (ECSU), Professor-in-Charge of Physical & Earth Sciences Division, and Joint Secretary and Joint Director of ISI. Upon his retirement as the head of ECSU, he was honored to accept a professor emeritus position at the newly formed Knowledge-based Computer Systems (KBCS) division of ISI, which he helped build from the ground up. Dutta Majumder has published over 500 research papers and several books.

Prof. Dutta Majumder died on 27 June 2020, at the age of 88.

== Honours and awards ==
Dutta Majumder has received recognition for his work, including:

- Norbert Wiener Award (1977)
- IAPR Fellow (1994): First Indian fellow.
- P. C. Mahalanobis Medal (1993)
- J. L. Nehru Birth Centenary Lecture Award of INSA (1994)
- Shri Om Prakash Bhasin Award (1996)
- Frank George Research Award (1999)
- Rathindra Purashkar from Viswa Bharathi University (2001)
- Professor Jnan Chandra Ghosh Award from Bengal Science Association (2003)
- Life-time Achievement Award from INAE (2004)
- Norbert Wiener Award of Excellence from Western Oklahoma State College (WOSC) (2005)
- National Vasvik Award (2008)

Majumdar was elected as a Fellow of the Indian National Science Academy, the Indian National Academy of Engineering and the Academy of Sciences for the Developing World.

== Bibliography ==
- Majumder, Dutta, ed. (1978). Pattern Recognition and Digital Techniques. Statistical Publishing Society, Calcutta, Indian Statistical Institute.
- Majumder, Dutta; Das, J. (1982). Digital Computer's Memory Technology. Wiley Eastern India Ltd.
- Majumder, D. Dutta, ed. (1982). Advances In Information Science and Technology. Statistical Publishing Society, Calcutta, Indian Statistical Institute.
- Majumder, D. Dutta; Pal, S. K. (1985). Fuzzy Mathematical Approach in Pattern Recognition. Wiley Eastern India Ltd.
- Majumder, D. Dutta; Chaudhuri, B. B. (1993). Two-tone Image Processing and Recognition. Wiley Eastern Ltd. New Delhi. ISBN 978-81-224-0484-5.
- Majumder, D. Dutta; Chanda, B. (2003). Digital Image Processing and Analysis. Prentice Hall India.
- Majumder, D. Dutta; Chanda, B., eds. (2009). Pattern Directed Information Analysis. New Age International.
- Majumder, D. Dutta; Chakraborty, Debjani; Nanda, S., eds. (2007). Fuzzy Logic and Its Application in Technology and Management. Narosa Publishing House.
- Majumder, D. Dutta; Karan, S. (2013). "Magnetic Properties of Ceramic Nanocomposites". Ceramic Nanocomposites. Woodhead Publishing.
