= Milton Sobel =

American mathematician and statistician (1919–2002)

Milton Sobel (August 30, 1919 – December 31, 2002) was an American mathematician and statistician professor emeritus of statistics at the University of California, Santa Barbara. He made notable contributions in the areas of decision theory, sequential analysis, selection and ranking, reliability analysis, combinatorial problems, and Dirichlet processes. Of particular note are his contributions in selection and ranking, a series of work on sequential analysis and reliability along with Benjamin Epstein.

He obtained his B.A. in mathematics (1940) from the City College of New York, M.A. in mathematics (1946) and Ph.D. in mathematical statistics (advisor: Abraham Wald, 1951) from Columbia University.

During 1960-1975 he was Professor of Statistics at the University of Minnesota.

== Books ==
- 1985: Selected Tables in Mathematical Statistics: Dirchlet Integrals of Type 2 and Their Applications (with V. R. R. Uppuluri, K. Frankowski)
- 1977: Selecting and Ordering Populations (with Jean D. Gibbons and Ingram Olkin)
- 1968: Sequential Identification and Ranking Procedures (with Robert E. Bechhofer and Jack C. Kiefer)

== Honors ==
- Fellow of the Institute of Mathematical Statistics (1956)
- Fellow of the American Statistical Association (1958)
- Guggenheim Fellowship (1967–1968)
- NIH Fellowship (1968–1969)
- Elected membership in the International Statistical Institute (1974)
