= Rajeeva Laxman Karandikar =

Indian mathematician

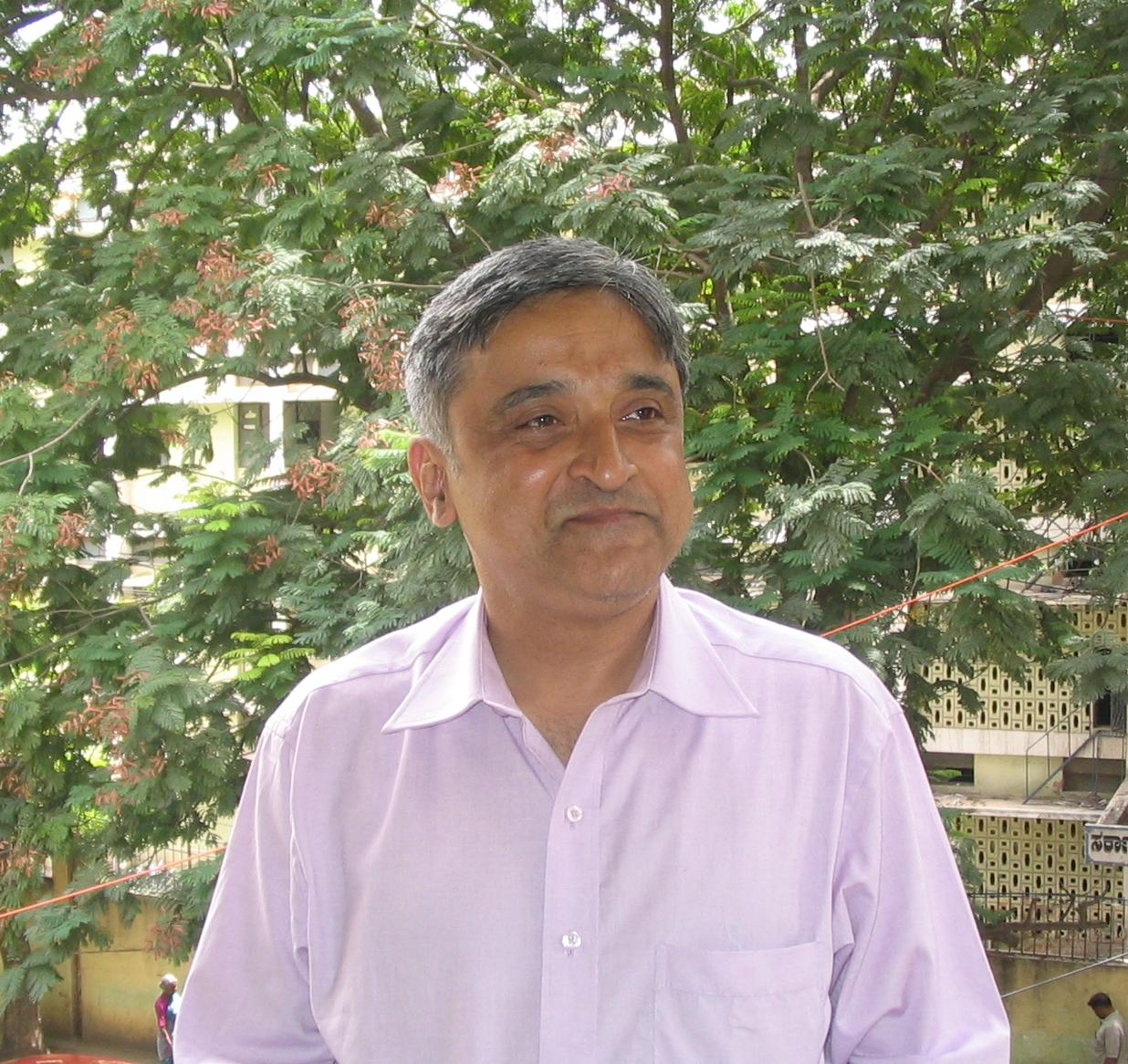
- Born: 11 June 1956 (age 70); Indore, Madhya Pradesh, India
- Education: Indian Statistical Institute, University of Indore
- Awards: Shanti Swarup Bhatnagar Award
- Scientific career
- Fields: Mathematics
- Workplaces: Chennai Mathematical Institute

Rajeeva Laxman Karandikar (born 11 June 1956) is an Indian mathematician, statistician and psephologist. He served as the director of Chennai Mathematical Institute (CMI) from 2010 until 2021 and now he is Professor Emeritus at CMI. He is a Fellow of the Indian Academy of Sciences and Indian National Science Academy.

He also served as Chairman of the National Statistical Commission, Government of India, from 2022 to 2026.

== Academic life ==
He received his B.Sc. degree in mathematics from Holkar Science College, University of Indore, Indore in June 1976 and his M.Stat. from Indian Statistical Institute in July 1978. He later obtained his PhD degree from ISI, Calcutta in December 1981. He went for his postdoctoral research to University of North Carolina, Chapel Hill to work under Gopinath Kallianpur. He spent three years as a visiting professor at University of North Carolina at Chapel Hill and returned to Indian Statistical Institute, Delhi in 1984 as an associate professor. He became a full professor in 1989. In 2006, he moved to Cranes Software International Limited as executive vice president for analytics. He moved to Chennai Mathematical Institute in 2010.

== Research ==
His research interests include several areas of probability theory, Finitely additive probability measures, stochastic calculus, martingale problems and Markov processes, Filtering theory, option pricing theory, psephology in the context of Indian elections and cryptography, among others.

== Other activities ==
He has conducted opinion polls for Indian Parliamentary elections and state assembly polls for Doordarshan, Aaj Tak/T V Today, Network 18, Hindustan Times, Indian Express, ABP News. He has also conducted training programmes on Stochastic Calculus for ICICI Bank and other financial organizations.

Over the last 25 years, he has also used his statistical and mathematical understanding in various application areas- this started with Opinion poll based election prediction. Over the last two decades, he has played a role in various fields: He was consulted by the Central bureau of Investigations (CBI) in a case regarding cheating in a multiple choice examination. He has worked with Weapons & Electronics Systems Engineering Establishment (WESEE), under Ministry of Defense, Government of India on Cryptography and developed Block Ciphers for WESEE. He was engaged by Clearing Corporation of India (CCIL) during 2016-2019 to review Risk Management Models and Processes at CCIL. He was Chairman of the working group of the National Sample Survey, for the 71st Round. He was a member of the committee constituted by Election Commission (EC) of India to advise EC on the sampling scheme for EVM-VVPAT verification. The report was the basis of EC's final reply to the Supreme Court just before the 2019 parliamentary poll. He was a member of the expert committee constituted by the Supreme Court (with Justice Singhvi (Retd) as Chairman, Mr Nandan Nilkeni, Dr V. Bhatkar as members) in 2019 regarding suggesting steps to deal with fraud in online examinations.

== Books ==
- Gopinath Kallianpur; Rajeeva L. Karandikar (1 January 1988). White Noise Theory of Prediction, Filtering and Smoothing. CRC Press. ISBN 978-2-88124-685-2.
- Gopinath Kallianpur; Rajeeva L. Karandikar (6 October 2012). Introduction to Option Pricing Theory. Birkhäuser Boston. ISBN 978-1-4612-6796-6.
- Rajeeva L. Karandikar; B V Rao (1 June 2018). Introduction to Stochastic Calculus. Springer Nature Singapore. ISBN 978-981-10-8318-1.
