= Palash Kumar =

Indian mathematician

Palash Kumar is an Indian mathematician. He holds a position at the Indian Statistical Institute.

He was awarded in 2011 the Shanti Swarup Bhatnagar Prize for Science and Technology, the highest science award in India, in the mathematical sciences category.
