= Chivukula Anjaneya Murthy =

Indian scientist and professor (1958–2018)

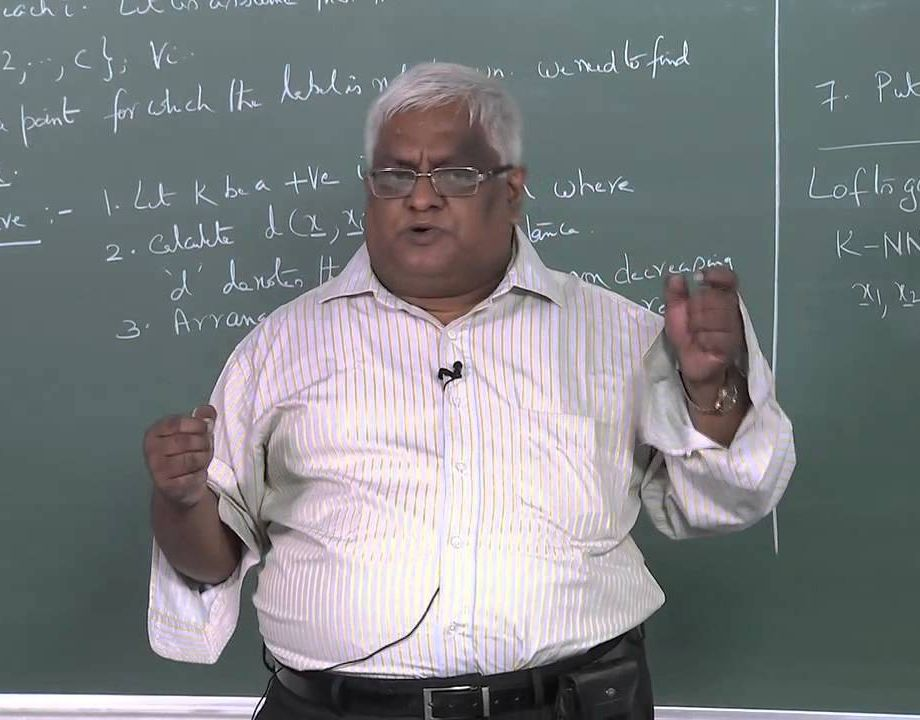
- Born: January 1, 1958; Ongole, India
- Died: 14 March 2018 (aged 60); Baranagar, Kolkata, India
- Education: Indian Statistical Institute
- Known for: Convergence of Genetic Algorithm
- Awards: Indian National Academy of Engineering Fellow (2001), National Academy of Sciences Fellow (2007), VASVIK Fellow (1999)
- Scientific career
- Fields: Statistics, Pattern Recognition, Machine Intelligence
- Workplaces: Indian Statistical Institute
- Website: www.isical.ac.in/~murthy/

C. A. Murthy (Chivukula Anjaneya Murthy) (1958–2018) was a senior scientist and higher academic grade Professor of the Indian Statistical Institute, whose primary research contributions were to the fields of pattern recognition, image processing, machine learning, neural networks, fractals, genetic algorithms, wavelets and data mining.

He was the head (2005-2010) of the Machine Intelligence Unit and professor-in-charge (2012-2014) of the Computer and Communication Sciences Division at the Indian Statistical Institute.

== Education ==
Murthy received his B. Stat., M. Stat. and Ph.D. degrees from the Indian Statistical Institute. He was a visiting researcher at Michigan State University in 1991-92, and Pennsylvania State University in 1996-97.

== Awards and recognition ==
Murthy was a Fellow of Indian National Academy of Engineering Fellow (2001), National Academy of Sciences Fellow (2007) and VASVIK Fellow (1999). Murthy's “An efficient method of hard and fuzzy clustering of multidimensional data” was awarded Computer Engineering Division Medal by the Institution of Engineers (India) in 1996-97.

According to Google Scholar, Murthy's work has been cited more than 5,000 times.

Murthy's NPTEL lecture series on pattern recognition has been reached more than 1 million views.

== Patents ==
Murthy's invention can be noted by his several research patents.

== Edited books ==
1. S. K. Pal and C. A. Murthy (Guest Editors), Image Processing, Vision and Pattern Recognition, Special issue of Proceedings of the Indian National Science Academy, Part-A, vol. 67, A, no. 2, March 2001.

2. B. B. Bhattacharya, C. A. Murthy, B. Chanda and B. B. Chaudhury (Eds), Proceedings of international conference on Computing: Theory and Applications, IEEE Press, pages 749, 2007.

3. B. Chanda and C. A. Murthy (Editors), Advances in intelligent information processing, Platinum Jubilee Series, Indian Statistical Institute, World Scientific, 2008. Series Editor is S.K. Pal.

4. S. Choudhury, S. Mitra, C. A. Murthy, P. S. Sastry and S. K. Pal (eds), Proceedings of the Third International Conference on -Pattern Recognition and Machine Intelligence (PReMI), Vol. LNCS 5909, ISBN 978-3-642-11163-1, Springer-Verlag, Berlin, Heidelberg, 2009.

== Death ==
Murthy died in a road accident in front of the Indian Statistical Institute.
