= Gopinath Kallianpur =

Indian mathematician

- Born: April 25, 1925; Mangalore, British India
- Died: February 19, 2015 (aged 89); Cleveland, Ohio, US
- Education: University of Madras
- Known for: Fisher consistency
- Scientific career
- Fields: Mathematics and Statistics
- Workplaces: Indian Statistical Institute
- Doctoral advisor: Herbert Robbins

Gopinath Kallianpur (1925–2015) was an Indian American mathematician and statistician who became the first director of the Indian Statistical Institute (1976–79) under its new Memorandum of Association. During his tenure as the director the new centre of ISI at Bangalore, Karnataka was founded.

== Early life ==
He received his Bachelor's degree in 1945 and Master's degree in 1946 from the University of Madras. In Bombay Kallianpur came in contact with D. D. Kosambi, a well-known mathematician and versatile scholar and with Subbaramiah Minakshisundaram at Andhra University which was then in Guntur. Under the supervision of Herbert Robbins, of the Statistics Department of the University of North Carolina, Chapel Hill he obtained his doctoral degree in 1951 in the then developing field of stochastic processes.

== Academic life ==
In the start of his career he held the position of lecturer at the University of California, Berkeley, during 1951–52, and was a member of the Institute for Advanced Study, Princeton, from 1952 to 1953. In 1953 Kallianpur joined ISI and stayed in Calcutta until the summer of 1956. During the period distinguished scientists, like Ronald Fisher, Norbert Wiener and Yuri Linnik visited the Institute. Norbert Wiener collaborated with Kallianpur on topics including ergodic theory, prediction theory and generalized harmonic analysis Between 1956 and 1976 Kallianpur held a number of faculty positions at the Michigan State University (1956–59, 1961–63); Indiana University (1959–61); University of Minnesota. At University of Minnesota Kallianpur collaborated with Charlotte Striebel, a member of the Research Group of Lockheed Corporation working on filtering and control problems. From 1976 to 1979 he became the first director of the Indian Statistical Institute. In 1979 he was appointed Alumni Distinguished Professor at the University of North Carolina, Chapel Hill (1979–2001). Six years after his retirement in 2001 Kallianpur moved to Nashville, Tennessee where he continued to work on mathematics, until moving to Cleveland, Ohio in 2014.

== Books authored ==
- Stochastic Filtering Theory. Applications of Mathematics 13, Springer Verlag, New York, Berlin, 1980.
- Gopinath Kallianpur; Rajeeva L. Karandikar (January 1, 1988). White Noise Theory of Prediction, Filtering and Smoothing. CRC Press. ISBN 978-2-88124-685-2.
- Gopinath Kallianpur; Rajeeva L. Karandikar (October 6, 2012). Introduction to Option Pricing Theory. Birkhäuser Boston. ISBN 978-1-4612-6796-6.
