= Sanghamitra Bandyopadhyay =

Indian computer scientist (born 1968)

Padma Shri Sanghamitra Bandyopadhyay
- Born: 1968 (age 57–58); Bally, West Bengal, India
- Education: Presidency College, Kolkata (B.Sc. Physics); University of Calcutta, Rajabazar campus (B.Tech.) Indian Institute of Technology, Kharagpur (M.Tech.); Indian Statistical Institute (Ph.D.); University of New South Wales, Sydney (Postdoc); University of Texas, Arlington ICTP, Italy
- Awards: Padma Shri (2022) Infosys Prize (2017)
- Scientific career
- Fields: Computer Science
- Workplaces: Indian Statistical Institute

Notes
- Worked in many Universities and research laboratories including Stanford University, Los Alamos National Laboratory, University of Maryland, Heidelberg University, University of Roma Tre, International Centre for Theoretical Physics, University of Ljubljana

Sanghamitra Bandyopadhyay (born 1968) is an Indian scientist specializing in computational biology. A professor at the Indian Statistical Institute, Kolkata, she is a Shanti Swarup Bhatnagar Prize winner in Engineering Science for 2010, Infosys Prize (2017) laureate in the Engineering and Computer Science category and TWAS Prize winner for Engineering Sciences in 2018. Her research is mainly in the areas of evolutionary computation, pattern recognition, machine learning and bioinformatics. Since 1 August 2015, she has been the Director of the Indian Statistical Institute, and she would oversee the functioning of all five centres of Indian Statistical Institute located at Kolkata, Bangalore, Delhi, Chennai, and Tezpur besides several other Statistical Quality Control & Operation Research Units spread across India. She was the first woman Director of the Indian Statistical Institute. Currently she is on the Prime Ministers' Science, Technology and Innovation Advisory Council.

Sanghamitra Bandyopadhyay has been honoured with the Padma Shri, the fourth highest Indian civilian award, for her contributions to the Science and Engineering in 2022 by the Government of India.

== Education and career ==
Sanghamitra Bandyopadhyay obtained a bachelor of science in physics from Presidency College, Kolkata before obtaining another bachelor's degree (of technology) in Computer Science in 1992 from Rajabazar Science College Campus of University of Calcutta. She then obtained a master's degree in computer science from the Indian Institute of Technology, Kharagpur before pursuing a Ph. D. at the Indian Statistical Institute, obtaining it in 1998.

== Awards and honours ==
- Padma Shri for Science and Engineering, by Government of India, 2022
- TWAS Prize for Engineering Sciences, by TWAS, 2018 The World Academy of Sciences 2018
- Asian Scientist 100, Asian Scientist, 2018, 2019, 2023
- Infosys Prize 2017 in Engineering and Computer Science
- Distinguished Alumnus Award, IIT Kharagpur, 2017
- Shanti Swarup Bhatnagar Prize in Engineering Science, 2010
- J. C. Bose Fellowship
- Senior Associate, International Centre for Theoretical Physics (ICTP), Trieste, Italy, 2013-2019
- Humboldt Fellowship from AvH Foundation, Germany, 2009-2010
- Swarnajayanti Fellowship, 2006-2007
- Fellow, The World Academy of Sciences (TWAS), 2019
- Fellow, Indian National Science Academy (INSA), 2016
- IEEE Fellow, 2016
- Fellow, Indian National Academy of Engineering (INAE), 2012
- Fellow, National Academy of Sciences, India (NASI), Allahabad, 2010
- Fellow, Indian Academy of Sciences, India (IASc), Bangalore, 2023
