= Sankar Kumar Pal =

Indian computer scientist (born 1950)

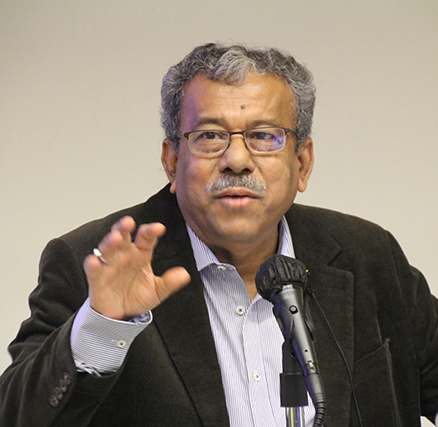
- Prof. Sankar Kumar Pal in 2017
- Born: 1950 (age 75–76); Kolkata, India
- Education: Rajabazar Science College; University of Calcutta Indian Statistical Institute Imperial College London; Post-doctoral: University of California, Berkeley; University of Maryland, College Park; NASA Johnson Space Center, Houston
- Known for: Fuzzy neural network; Soft computing; Machine intelligence; Pattern recognition
- Awards: Padma Shri, Shanti Swarup Bhatnagar Prize
- Scientific career
- Fields: Computer science
- Workplaces: Indian Statistical Institute

Sankar Kumar Pal (born 1950) is an Indian computer scientist. He has served as Director as well as the President of the Indian Statistical Institute (ISI), Kolkata, and now serving as its Emeritus Professor. He is an ANRF Prime Minister Professor of the Government of India, currently hosted at IIIT Bhubaneswar.

His research includes pattern recognition, image processing, fuzzy neural networks, rough fuzzy hybridization, soft computing, granular mining, and machine intelligence. His work focuses on fuzzy set theory, neuro-fuzzy systems, rough-fuzzy computing, and uncertainty modelling, with applications in pattern recognition, image processing, machine learning, knowledge-based systems, and data mining. He founded the Machine Intelligence Unit in 1993 and the Center for Soft Computing Research in 2004, both at ISI.

He received the Shanti Swarup Bhatnagar Prize in 1990. In 2013, he was awarded the Padma Shri in Science and Engineering by the President of India for his contributions in machine intelligence.

== Education and career ==
Pal studied at the University of Calcutta, earning a BSc in physics (1969), a BTech (1972), and an MTech (1974) in radio physics and electronics. He received a PhD in radio physics and electronics from Rajabazar Science College, University of Calcutta in 1979 as a student of Indian Statistical Institute and another PhD in electrical engineering along with the Diploma of Imperial College from Imperial College London in 1982. His first PhD focused on pattern recognition, and the second on image processing.

After his PhD at Imperial College London as a Commonwealth Scholar, he was a postdoctoral fellow (1982–1983) as a UK Medical Research Council Fellow. Pal worked at the University of California, Berkeley and University of Maryland, College Park (1986–1987) as a Fulbright Fellow, and at the NASA Johnson Space Center (1990–1992 and 1994) as a US National Research Council Senior Resident Research Associate. He also held visiting positions at the US Naval Research Laboratory, Washington, D.C., and several universities in Australia, Poland, Italy, France, New Zealand, Japan, and Hong Kong. He established collaborations with institutions such as University of Warsaw (1997–2017), University of Naples Federico II (2004–2020), INSEAD (2001–2013), and Hong Kong Polytechnic University (1999–2008). (Ref: Getting to know ... (IAPR News Letter, vol. 34, no.3, July-August 2012 https://iapr.org/members/newsletter/Newsletter12-03/index.htm ))

Pal joined Indian Statistical Institute (ISI), Kolkata, as a CSIR senior research fellow in 1975, became professor in 1987, distinguished scientist in 1998, director (2005–2010), and President (2022–2026). He retired from ISI as a distinguished scientist in 2015. He was the first computer scientist to serve as ISI director and the first former employee elected as ISI president.

He has co-authored over 500 publications, 21 books, and 20 conference proceedings, holds two U.S. patents, and has served as editor for more than 20 journals in computer science and engineering.

His book, Fuzzy Mathematical Approach to Pattern Recognition, published by John Wiley & Sons (Halsted Press), has been translated into Indonesian and Chinese.

He is one of the ten examples out of 31000 Commonwealth Scholars whose stories of impact and leadership are featured in the 65th Special anniversary edition of Common Knowledge (Issue # 17, November 2024): Celebrating the impact and legacy of Commonwealth Scholarships (UK) since 1960 (https://reader.experios.com/54578/5744/?page=1)

Pal introduced Soft Computing research in India in the mid-1990s. The Department of Science and Technology established the Center for Soft Computing Research (CSCR) in 2004 at ISI, with Pal as Principal Investigator. CSCR became an Associate Institute of ISI in 2010.

During his directorship (2005–2010), ISI established the Chennai Center and approved the North Eastern Center, and implemented IISc pay scales for faculty. ISI also started celebrating P.C. Mahalanobis’s birthday as National Statistics Day from 2006.

Pal has served as founding president of the Indian National Academy of Engineering, Kolkata Chapter. The Biennial International Conference on Pattern Recognition and Machine Intelligence (PReMI) originated from the Machine Intelligence Unit of ISI, Kolkata in 2005 under his guidance.

=== Family ===
Pal was born on 13 September 1950 to Sunity Kumar Pal and Parul Bala Pal. He is the second of five siblings and has two sons, Dhiman Sankar Pal and Anshuman Sankar Pal, with his wife, Amita Pal.

== Awards and recognition ==
Pal has received numerous awards, including:

- 1990 Shanti Swarup Bhatnagar Prize
- 1993 Jawaharlal Nehru Fellowship
- 1993 Hari Om Ashram Prerit Vikram Sarabhai Research Award
- 1993 NASA Tech Briefs Award
- 1994 IEEE Transactions on Neural Networks Outstanding Paper Award
- 1995 NASA Patent Application Award
- 1997 IETE Ram Lal Wadhwa Gold Medal
- 1998 Om Prakash Bhasin Award from the Prime Minister of India
- 1999 G.D. Birla Award
- 1998 Distinguished Scientist of Indian Statistical Institute
- 2000–2001 FICCI Award
- 2000 Inaugural Al Khwarizmi International Award from President of Iran
- 2001 Syed Husain Zaheer Medal of Indian National Science Academy
- 2003 5th Distinguished Information Technology Lecture, Ministry of Communication and Information Technology, Government of India
- 2004 1st "Bengal Science Lecture" Award, Dept. of Science & Technology, Government of West Bengal
- 2005–06 P.C. Mahalanobis Birth Centenary Gold Medal of Indian Science Congress Association from Prime Minister of India
- 2006 Distinguished Alumnus of the Institute of Radio Physics and Electronics, University of Calcutta
- 2007 J.C. Bose National Fellowship, Government of India
- 2008 Vigyan Ratna Award from Science & Culture Organization, West Bengal
- 2010 P.C. Mahalanobis Memorial Medal from Indian Science News Association
- 2013 Chair Professor of Indian National Academy of Engineering
- 2013 Faraday Memorial Lecture award, IEEE Hyderabad Section
- 2013 Padma Shri
- 2015 S.N. Mitra Award, Indian National Academy of Engineering
- 2015 Raja Ramanna Distinguished Fellowship, Dept. of Atomic Energy, Government of India
- 2017 Jawaharlal Nehru Birth Centenary Lecture Award, Indian National Science Academy
- 2018 Distinguished Professorial Chair, Indian National Science Academy
- 2019 Scholar-in-Residence, Indian Institute of Technology Jodhpur
- 2018 Emeritus Professor, Indian Statistical Institute
- 2020 National Science Chair, Government of India
- 2021 AICTE Distinguished Chair Professor
- 2023 Prasanta Chandra Mahalanobis Memorial Lecture Award, Dept. of Science & Technology and Biotechnology, Government of West Bengal
- 2023 Distinguished Alumni Award, Ramakrishna Mission Vivekananda Centenary College
- 2024 Indian National Science Academy Distinguished Lecture Fellow
- 2025 Visiting Distinguished Professor, Indian Institute of Technology, Indore
- 2025 Doctor of Science (D.Sc.), honoris causa, Sai University, Chennai
- 2025 ANRF Prime Minister Professor, Government of India
- 2026 Indian National Academy of Engineering (INAE) Life Time Contribution Award in Engineering

Pal is an elected fellow of the Institute of Electrical and Electronics Engineers, TWAS, International Association for Pattern Recognition, International Fuzzy Systems Association, International Rough Set Society, Asia-Pacific Artificial Intelligence Association, International Artificial Intelligence Industry Alliance, Web Intelligence Academy (founding fellow), Indian National Science Academy, Indian Academy of Sciences, The National Academy of Sciences, India, and Indian National Academy of Engineering. He is a foreign member of the European Academy of Sciences and Arts. He is the 14th President of Indian Statistical Institute and a vice president of the International Artificial Intelligence Industry Alliance.
