= Marshall–Olkin exponential distribution =

Probability distribution in applied statistics

Marshall–Olkin exponential
- Support: $x\in [0, \infty)^b$

In applied statistics, the Marshall–Olkin exponential distribution is any member of a certain family of continuous multivariate probability distributions with positive-valued components. It was introduced by Albert W. Marshall and Ingram Olkin. One of its main uses is in reliability theory, where the Marshall–Olkin copula models the dependence between random variables subjected to external shocks.

== Definition ==
Let $\{E_B : \varnothing \ne B\subset \{1,2,\ldots,b\}\}$ be a set of independent, exponentially distributed random variables, where $E_B$ has mean $1/\lambda_B$. Let

$$T_j=\min\{E_B:j\in B\},\ \ j=1,\ldots,b.$$

The joint distribution of $T=(T_1,\ldots,T_b)$ is called the Marshall–Olkin exponential distribution with parameters $\{\lambda _B,B\subset \{1,2,\ldots,b\}\}.$

=== Concrete example ===
Suppose b = 3. Then there are seven nonempty subsets of { 1, ..., b } = { 1, 2, 3 }; hence seven different exponential random variables:

$$E_{\{1\}}, E_{\{2\}}, E_{\{3\}}, E_{\{1,2\}}, E_{\{1,3\}}, E_{\{2,3\}}, E_{\{1,2,3\}}$$

Then we have:

$$\begin{align}
T_1 & = \min\{ E_{\{1\}}, E_{\{1,2\}}, E_{\{1,3\}}, E_{\{1,2,3\}} \} \\
T_2 & = \min\{ E_{\{2\}}, E_{\{1,2\}}, E_{\{2,3\}}, E_{\{1,2,3\}} \} \\
T_3 & = \min\{ E_{\{3\}}, E_{\{1,3\}}, E_{\{2,3\}}, E_{\{1,2,3\}} \} \\
\end{align}$$
