= Jean D. Gibbons =

American statistician

Jean Dickinson Gibbons (née Dickinson, born 1938) is an American statistician, an expert in nonparametric statistics and an author of books on statistics. She was the first chair of the Committee on Women in Statistics of the American Statistical Association, and the Jean Dickinson Gibbons Graduate Program in Statistics at Virginia Tech is named for her.

== Life ==
Despite her parents' expectations that she become a nurse or teacher, Gibbons graduated magna cum laude in mathematics in 1958 from Duke University, and continued at Duke for a master's degree, with a master's thesis on Judgments Concerning Applications of Measures of Central Tendency. She went on to do graduate study at Columbia University, but completed her PhD in 1962 from Virginia Tech. Her dissertation was The Small-Sample Power of some Nonparametric Tests.

After teaching at Mercer University and the University of Cincinnati, she was hired by the Wharton School of the University of Pennsylvania in 1963. She followed her husband to the University of Alabama, where she remained despite separating from him and remarrying, until her early retirement in 1995 at age 57.

== Books ==
Gibbons is the author of ten books. They include:

- Nonparametric Statistical Inference (McGraw Hill, 1971; 2nd ed., Marcel Dekker, 1985; 4th ed. with Subhabrata Chakraborti, Marcel Dekker, 2003; 5th ed., CRC Press, 2010; 6th ed., CRC Press 2020)
- Selecting and Ordering Populations: A New Statistical Methodology (with Ingram Olkin and Milton Sobel, Wiley, 1977; Society for Industrial & Applied Mathematics and Cambridge University Press, 2008)
- Concepts of Nonparametric Theory (with John W Pratt, Springer, 1981)
- Nonparametric Methods for Quantitative Analysis (American Sciences Press, 1976; 2nd ed., 1985; 3rd ed., 1997)
- Rank Correlation Methods (5th ed., with Maurice Kendall, Edward Arnold, 1990, update of a book originally published by Kendall alone in 1948)
- Nonparametric Statistics: An introduction (Sage, 1993)
- Nonparametric Measures of Association (Sage, 1993)

== Awards and honors ==
Gibbons became a Fellow of the American Statistical Association in 1972, becoming "probably the youngest female ever elected as a fellow".

In 2015, the graduate program in statistics at Virginia Tech was named in her honor.
