= Samarendra Nath Roy =

Indian-born American mathematician

S.N. Roy
- সমরেন্দ্রনাথ রায়
- Samarendra Nath Roy
- Born: 11 December 1906; Calcutta, India
- Died: 23 July 1964 (aged 57); Jasper, Alberta, Canada
- Citizenship: United States
- Education: Rajabazar Science College (Calcutta University)
- Known for: Multivariate analysis
- Parent(s): Kali Nath Roy (Father), Suniti Bala Devi (Mother)
- Scientific career
- Fields: Mathematician and Statistician
- Workplaces: Rajabazar Science College; Calcutta University; Indian Statistical Institute; University of North Carolina, Chapel Hill
- Doctoral advisor: P. C. Mahalanobis; N. R. Sen
- Doctoral students: Ingram Olkin

Samarendra Nath Roy (11 December 1906 – 23 July 1964) was an Indian-born American mathematician and an applied statistician.

== Early life ==
Roy was the first of three children of Kali Nath Roy and Suniti Bala Roy. His father, was a freedom fighter and the Chief Editor of the newspaper The Tribune, then publishing from Lahore. Roy and The Tribune published seven allegedly seditious articles from April 3, 1919 through April 11, 1919, leading up to the April 13th massacre of the Indians at the hands of the British in the infamous Jallianwala Bagh massacre. For this "offence" Kali Nath Roy was sentenced to imprisonment of two years along with a fine of one thousand rupees.

Roy secured first division in the Matriculation Examination in 1923 from the Khulna District School. He was the topper in the Intermediate Science (Higher Secondary) Examinations in 1925 from the Daulatpur Hindu Academy. He obtained first class and was the topper in both the BSc Mathematics (Honours) from Presidency College of the University of Calcutta in 1928 and the MSc in Mixed Mathematics - which later was renamed to Applied Mathematics - (with The Theory of Relativity as the elective) from the renowned Rajabazar Science College, University of Calcutta in 1931.

== Academic career ==
In 1931, when Roy joined the Department of Applied Mathematics of Rajabazar Science College at the University of Calcutta as a research associate, he used computing facilities at the newly established Indian Statistical Institute, which was founded by Professor P. C. Mahalanobis. Roy along with several talented young scholars including J. M. Sengupta, H. C. Sinha, Raj Chandra Bose, K. R. Nair, K. Kishen and C. R. Rao, joined to form an active group of statisticians under Mahalanobis. Roy was one of the very early students of Mahalanobis, who initiated some of the early works in Statistics. He was well known for his pioneering contribution to multivariate statistical analysis, mainly that of the Jacobians of complicated transformations for various exact distributions, rectangular coordinates and the Bartlett decomposition. His dissertation included the Post master's work at the Indian Statistical Institute where he worked under Mahalanobis.

It was Bose who first went to the United States as a visiting professor at Columbia University and then joined the University of North Carolina at Chapel Hill in 1947. Roy followed suit by later joining him at the University of North Carolina at Chapel Hill in the spring of 1950, after initially travelling to the United States to take up a Visiting Professorship of Statistics at Columbia University in New York in the spring of 1949. In between this Roy returned to India and became Head of the Department of Statistics at the University of Calcutta during the academic year 1949–50. Roy joined Bose as full Professor of Statistics in the Statistics Department at the University of North Carolina at Chapel Hill. S. N. Roy had 15 doctorate students there from 1950 till 1963. To commemorate his Birth Centenary an International Conference on "Multivariate Statistical Methods in the 21st Century: The Legacy of Prof. S.N. Roy" was held at Kolkata, India during 28–29 December 2006. The Journal of Statistical Planning and Inference published a special issue for celebrating the Centennial of Birth of S. N. Roy.

== Personal life ==
Roy was married to Bani Roy and had four children, Prabir, Subir, Tapon and Sunanda. He died while on holiday in Jasper, Canada.

== Selected publications ==
- Potthoff, R. F. and Roy, S. N. (1964), "A generalized multivariate analysis of variance model useful especially for growth curve problems", Biometrika, vol. 51, pp. 313–326.
- Roy, S. N. (1957), "Some Aspects of Multivariate Analysis", New York: Wiley.
- Roy, S. N. and Sarhan, A. E. (1956), "On inverting a class of patterned matrices", Biometrika, 43, 227–231.

== Selected Ph.D. dissertations under Roy's guidance ==
- Olkin, Ingram (1951). "On distribution problems in multivariate analysis".
- Pachares, James (1953). "On the distribution of quadratic forms".
- Pillai, K.C. Sreedharan (1954). "On some distribution problems in multivariate analysis".
- Mitra, Sujit Kumar (1956). "Contributions to the statistical analysis of categorical data".
- Gnanadesikan, Ramanathan (1957). "Contributions to multivariate analysis including univariate and multivariate variance components analysis and factor analysis".
- Potthoff, Richard F. (1958). "Multi-dimensional incomplete block designs".
- Diadmond, Earl L. (1958). "Asymptotic power and independence of certain classes of tests on categorical data".
- Bargman, Rolf (1958). "A study of independence and dependence in multivariate normal analysis".
- Cobb, Whitfield (1959). "Studies in univariate and multivariate variance components analysis connected with sampling from a finite population".
- Bhapkar, Vasant P. (1959). "Contributions to the statistical analysis of experiments with one or more responses".
- Sathe, Yashawande S. (1962). "Studies in certain types of nonparametric inference".
- Das Gupta, Somesh (1963). "Some problems in classification".
- Mudholkar, Govind S. (1963). "Some contributions to the theory of univariate and multivariate statistical analysis".

== Recognition ==
- Fellow of the Institute of Mathematical Statistics
- Fellow of the International Statistical Institute in 1951
- President of the Statistical Section of the Indian Science Congress in 1948
- Fellow of The National Institute of Sciences (FNASc), India (now known as the Indian National Science Academy) in 1946
