= Delores Conway =

American statistician

Delores Ann Conway is an American statistician and economist known for her work on the statistics of real estate markets. She is Professor of Real Estate Economics and Statistics in the Simon Business School of the University of Rochester.

== Education and career ==
Conway graduated in 1971 from the University of Wisconsin–Madison, with a bachelor's degree in mathematics, earning a second bachelor's degree in computer methods and statistics in 1972. She went to Stanford University for graduate study in statistics, earning a master's degree in 1975 and completing her Ph.D. in 1979. Her dissertation, Multivariate Distribution with Specified Marginals, was supervised by Ingram Olkin.

She became an assistant professor of business at the University of Chicago in 1979, as the first female faculty member in the University of Chicago Booth School of Business, and moved to the USC Marshall School of Business as an associate professor in 1985. At USC, she directed the Casden Real Estate Economics Forecast, beginning in 2004. She moved to the University of Rochester as associate dean in 2009.

== Recognition ==
In 1997, Conway was elected as a Fellow of the American Statistical Association.

== Personal life ==
After moving to Rochester, Conway married the president of the university, Joel Seligman.
