= Larry V. Hedges =

American statistician

- Born: Larry Vernon Hedges
- Education: Stanford University (Ph.D., 1980)
- Known for: Meta-analysis; Statistical methodology
- Awards: Yidan Prize for Education Research (2018)
- Scientific career
- Fields: Statistics
- Workplaces: University of Chicago; Northwestern University
- Thesis: Combining the Results of Experiments Using Different Scales of Measurement (1980)
- Doctoral advisor: Ingram Olkin

Larry Vernon Hedges is a researcher in statistical methods for meta-analysis and evaluation of education policy. He is Professor of Statistics and Education and Social Policy, Institute for Policy Research, Northwestern University. Previously, he was the Stella M. Rowley Distinguished Service Professor of Education, Sociology, Psychology, and Public Policy Studies at the University of Chicago. He is a member of the National Academy of Education and a fellow of the American Academy of Arts and Sciences, the American Educational Research Association, the American Psychological Association, and the American Statistical Association. In 2018, he received the Yidan Prize for Education Research, one of the world's largest education prizes, which carries an award of HK$30 million (about US$3.9 million).

He has authored a number of articles and books on statistical methods for meta-analysis, which is the use of statistical methods for combining results from different studies. He also suggested several estimators for effect sizes and derived their properties. He carried out research on the relation of resources available to schools and student achievement, most notably the relation between class size and achievement.

== Hedges' g ==
In 1981, Hedges published a paper describing the unbiased standardized mean difference, the g statistic. "It turns out that [Cohen's] d has a slight bias, tending to overestimate the absolute value of in small samples. This bias can be removed by a simple correction that yields an unbiased estimate of, with the unbiased estimate sometimes called Hedges’ g."

== Bibliography ==
- Hedges, Larry V.; Olkin, Ingram (1985). Statistical methods for meta-analysis. Boston: Academic Press. ISBN 0-12-336380-2.
- Woodworth, George Walter; Hedges, Larry V.; Shymansky, James A. (1989). A practical guide to modern methods of meta-analysis. Arlington, VA: National Science Teachers Association. ISBN 0-87355-081-1.
- Hedges, Larry V.; Cooper, Harris M. (1994). The Handbook of research synthesis. New York: Russell Sage Foundation. ISBN 0-87154-226-9.
- Rothstein, Hannah; Borenstein, Michael; Hedges, Larry V. (2009). Introduction to Meta-Analysis (Statistics in Practice). New York: Wiley. ISBN 978-0-470-05724-7.
