= Kali Nath Roy =

Bengali journalist and editor

- কালীনাথ রায়
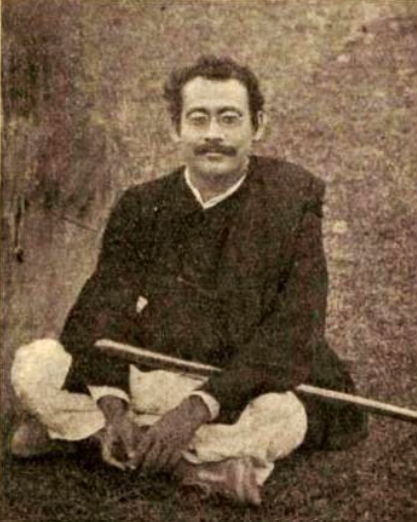
- Born: 1878; Jessore, British India (Present day Jessore, Bangladesh)
- Died: 9 December 1945 (aged 66–67); Calcutta, British India (Present day Kolkata, India)
- Education: Scottish Church College
- Occupation: Journalist
- Known for: Chief editors of The Tribune
- Movement: Indian Nationalism
- Children: Samarendra Nath Roy

Kali Nath Roy (1878 – 9 December 1945) was a Bengali nationalist journalist and the Chief Editor of the newspaper The Tribune. His son Samarendra Nath Roy was a mathematician and applied statistician.

== Early life ==
Roy was born in 1878 in Khulna, British India. While studying F.A. in Scottish Church College in Kolkata he joined in anti British movement and left college. He started work as sub editor of Bengali Magazine, edited by Surendranath Banerjee.

== Career ==
In 1911 Roy joined 'The Panjabi' magazine as editor thereafter become the editor-in-chief of the Tribune magazine published from Lahore. He condemned the atrocities of British police and martial law in his column as well as argued for press liberty. Government accused him for publication of seditious writings. Roy was popular for his fearless, brave articles and known as Kali Babu. Mahatma Gandhi praised Roy's political writings in 1932. Roy and The Tribune published seven allegedly seditious articles from April 3, 1919 through April 11, 1919, leading up to the April 13th massacre of the Indians at the hands of the British in the infamous Jallianwala Bagh massacre. For this Roy was sentenced to rigorous imprisonment for two years along with a fine of one thousand rupees. Lahore based Bengali advocate Sudhir Mukhopadhyay pleaded and defended for him in the Court and people collected money to run the case. Even Rabindranath Tagore tried personally for his release.

== Death ==
Roy's health declined rapidly in the severe winter of Lahore. He left Lahore on 1 December 1945, caught a chill during the journey and died on 9 December 1945 in Kolkata.
