= Benjamin Epstein (statistician) =

Israeli-American statistician (1918–2004)

Benjamin Epstein (March 5, 1918 – December 22, 2004) was an Israeli-American statistician and a pioneer in statistical theory of reliability. He and Milton Sobel are credited with introducing the statistical framework for life testing while working together at Wayne State University as faculty members during the 1950s.

== Education and career ==
Epstein was born in Boston, Massachusetts, and went to study at the Boston Latin School. He entered Massachusetts Institute of Technology to study mathematics at the age of 16 and went on to obtain an S.B. in 1937 and an M.Sc. in 1938, both in mathematics. He received his PhD in mathematics at University of Illinois Urbana-Champaign on transform theory in 1941 under the supervision of David G. Bourgin. During World War II, Epstein worked as an applied mathematician to investigate quality control problems, first at the Frankford Arsenal and then at Westinghouse Electric Corporation in Pittsburgh.

After the war, Epstein joined the Coal Research Laboratory at Carnegie Institute of Technology in 1946 and also worked as a lecturer at the Department of Mathematics at the university. Epstein joined the mathematics department at Wayne State University in 1948, where he was later joined by Milton Sobel for work on reliability theory and life testing. He stayed at Wayne State University until 1960 when he became a full professor. Epstein moved to Stanford University in 1960, where he was a professor of statistics for a few years before becoming an industry consultant in the Palo Alto area. Epstein relocated to Israel in 1968 to found the statistics group at Technion in the Industrial Engineering and Management department. He became the first full professor in statistics at Technion and taught there until his retirement in 1986.

== Honors and awards ==
In 1957, Epstein became a Fellow of the American Statistical Association. He was elected a fellow of the Institute of Mathematical Statistics in 1958. Epstein was a founding member of the Israeli Statistical Association (now Israel Statistics and Data Science Association) and was the president from 1979 to 1981. In 1974, he received the Shewhart Medal from the American Society for Quality.

== Bibliography ==
- Epstein, Benjamin (1948). "Statistical Aspects of Fracture Problems". Journal of Applied Physics. 19 (2): 140–147. doi:10.1063/1.1698380. ISSN 0021-8979.
- Epstein, Benjamin; Sobel, Milton (1953). "Life Testing". Journal of the American Statistical Association. 48 (263): 486–502. doi:10.2307/2281004. ISSN 0162-1459.
- Epstein, Benjamin (1954). "Truncated Life Tests in the Exponential Case". The Annals of Mathematical Statistics. 25 (3): 555–564. ISSN 0003-4851.
- Epstein, B.; Sobel, M. (1954). "Some Theorems Relevant to Life Testing from an Exponential Distribution". The Annals of Mathematical Statistics. 25 (2): 373–381. ISSN 0003-4851.
- Epstein, Benjamin; Sobel, Milton (1955). "Sequential Life Tests in the Exponential Case". The Annals of Mathematical Statistics. 26 (1): 82–93. ISSN 0003-4851.
- Epstein, Benjamin (1958). The Exponential Distribution and Its Role in Life-Testing (Report). Fort Belvoir, VA: Defense Technical Information Center. doi:10.21236/ad0158605.
- Epstein, Benjamin; Weissman, Ishay (2008). Mathematical Models for Systems Reliability. CRC Press. ISBN 978-1-040-20150-3.
