= Ingram Olkin =

American statistician (1924–2016)

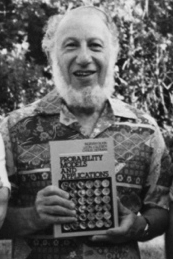
- Ingram Olkin in 1986
- Born: July 23, 1924; Waterbury, Connecticut, U.S.
- Died: April 28, 2016 (aged 91); Palo Alto, California, U.S.
- Education: University of North Carolina at Chapel Hill; Columbia University; City College of New York
- Scientific career
- Fields: Statistics
- Workplaces: Stanford University
- Doctoral advisor: S. N. Roy
- Doctoral students: Delores Conway; Larry V. Hedges

Ingram Olkin (July 23, 1924 – April 28, 2016) was a professor emeritus and chair of statistics and education at Stanford University and the Stanford Graduate School of Education. He is known for developing statistical analysis for evaluating policies, particularly in education, and for his contributions to meta-analysis, statistics education, multivariate analysis, and majorization theory.

== Biography ==
Olkin was born in 1924 in Waterbury, Connecticut. He received a B.S. in mathematics at the City College of New York, an M.A. from Columbia University, and his Ph.D. from the University of North Carolina. Olkin also studied with Harold Hotelling. Olkin's advisor was S. N. Roy and his Ph.D. thesis was "On distribution problems in multivariate analysis" submitted in 1951.

Olkin died from complications of colorectal cancer at his home in Palo Alto, California on April 28, 2016, aged 91.

== Honors and awards ==
Olkin was awarded the fourth biennial Elizabeth Scott Award in 1998 from the American Statistical Association for his achievements in supporting women in statistics. Of the 17 recipients thus far, he is the only man.

In 1962 he was elected as a Fellow of the American Statistical Association. In 1984, he was President of the Institute of Mathematical Statistics. In 1991 Olkin was awarded the American Statistical Association's Founders Award. Olkin is a Guggenheim, Fulbright, and Lady Davis Fellow, with an honorary doctorate from De Montfort University.

== Publications and editing ==
Olkin has written many books including Statistical methods for meta-analysis, Probability theory, and Education in a Research University. Olkin's coauthors include S. S. Shrikhande and Larry V. Hedges. Olkin has written two books with Albert W. Marshall, Inequalities: Theory of Majorization and its Applications (1979) and Life distributions: Structure of nonparametric, semiparametric, and parametric families (2007). In nonparametric statistics and decision theory, Olkin wrote Selecting and ordering populations: A new statistical methodology with Jean Dickinson Gibbons and Milton Sobel (1977, 1999).

Ingram was Editor of the Annals of Mathematical Statistics and served as the first editor of the Annals of Statistics, both published by the Institute of Mathematical Statistics. He was a primary force in the founding of the Journal of Educational Statistics, which is published with the American Statistical Association. Olkin was also an editor with the mathematics journal, Linear Algebra and its Applications, and has been active in supporting a series of international conferences on matrix theory, linear algebra, and statistics.

== Bibliography ==
- Golbeck, Amanda L.; Olkin, Ingram; Gel, Yulia R., eds. (2015). Leadership and Women in Statistics. Chapman & Hall/CRC Press. ISBN 978-1482236446.
- Hedges, Larry V.; Olkin, Ingram (1985). Statistical methods for meta-analysis. Boston: Academic Press. ISBN 978-0-12-336380-0.
- Marshall, Albert W.; Olkin, Ingram (1967), "A multivariate exponential distribution", Journal of the American Statistical Association, 62 (317): 30–49, doi:10.2307/2282907, JSTOR 2282907, MR 0215400
- Inequalities: Theory of Majorization and Its Applications (2011) Albert W. Marshall, Ingram Olkin, Barry Arnold, Springer, ISBN 978-0-387-40087-7
- Inequalities: Theory of Majorization and Its Applications (1979) Albert W. Marshall, Ingram Olkin, Academic Press, ISBN 978-0-12-473750-1
- "A Guide to Probability Theory and Application" (1973), with L. Gleser and C. Derman, Holt, Rinehart and Winston.
- "Probability Models and Application" (1994), with L. Gleser and C. Derman, Prentice Hall.
- A tribute to Marshall and Olkin's book "Inequalities: Theory of Majorization and its Applications"

== See also ==
- Marshall–Olkin exponential distribution
