= Yulia Gel =

- Education: Saint Petersburg State University; University of Washington
- Known for: Topological Data Analysis
- Scientific career
- Fields: Statistics
- Institutions: University of Texas at Dallas; University of Waterloo
- Academic advisors: Vladimir N. Fomin

Yulia R. Gel is a professor in the Department of Mathematical Sciences at the University of Texas at Dallas and an adjunct professor in the Department of Statistics and Actuarial Science of the University of Waterloo.

== Early life and education ==
Gel earned her doctorate in mathematics at Saint Petersburg State University in Russia, under the supervision of Vladimir N. Fomin. After postdoctoral research at the University of Washington, she joined the Waterloo faculty in 2004, and moved to Dallas in 2014.

== Research and career ==
Prior to joining the University of Texas at Dallas, Yulia Gel served as an Assistant/Associate Professor with tenure in the Department of Statistics and Actuarial Sciences at the University of Waterloo, Canada, from 2004 to 2014. She has also held visiting positions at prominent institutions such as NASA Jet Propulsion Lab (Caltech), the Isaac Newton Institute for Mathematical Sciences (Cambridge, UK), Johns Hopkins University, University of California at Berkeley, and George Washington University.

Yulia Gel has a diverse range of research interests that span statistical foundations of data science, machine learning, topological and geometric methods in statistics, and topological data analysis. Her work focuses on graph mining, inference for random graphs and complex networks, uncertainty quantification in network analysis, data depth on networks, time series analysis, spatio-temporal processes, and climate informatics. She is particularly interested in the application of statistical and data science techniques to domains such as healthcare predictive analytics and climate informatics.

== Awards and honors ==
In 2014 Yulia was elected as a Fellow of the American Statistical Association" for theoretical contributions to nonparametric aspects of spatiotemporal processes; for promoting the application of modern statistical methodologies in law, public policy, and the environmental sciences; and for championing the advancement of women and other under-represented groups in the mathematical and physical sciences."
