= Rough fuzzy hybridization =

- Class: Hybrid intelligent system
- Data structure: Granulated feature space
- Worst-case performance: Varies by implementation
- Worst-case space complexity: Varies by implementation

Rough fuzzy hybridization is a method of hybrid intelligent system or soft computing, where Fuzzy set theory is used for linguistic representation of patterns, leading to a fuzzy granulation of the feature space. Rough set theory is used to obtain dependency rules which model informative regions in the granulated feature space.
