= Bidyut Baran Chaudhuri =

Indian computer scientist (born 1950)

- Bengali: বিদ্যুৎ বরণ চৌধুরী
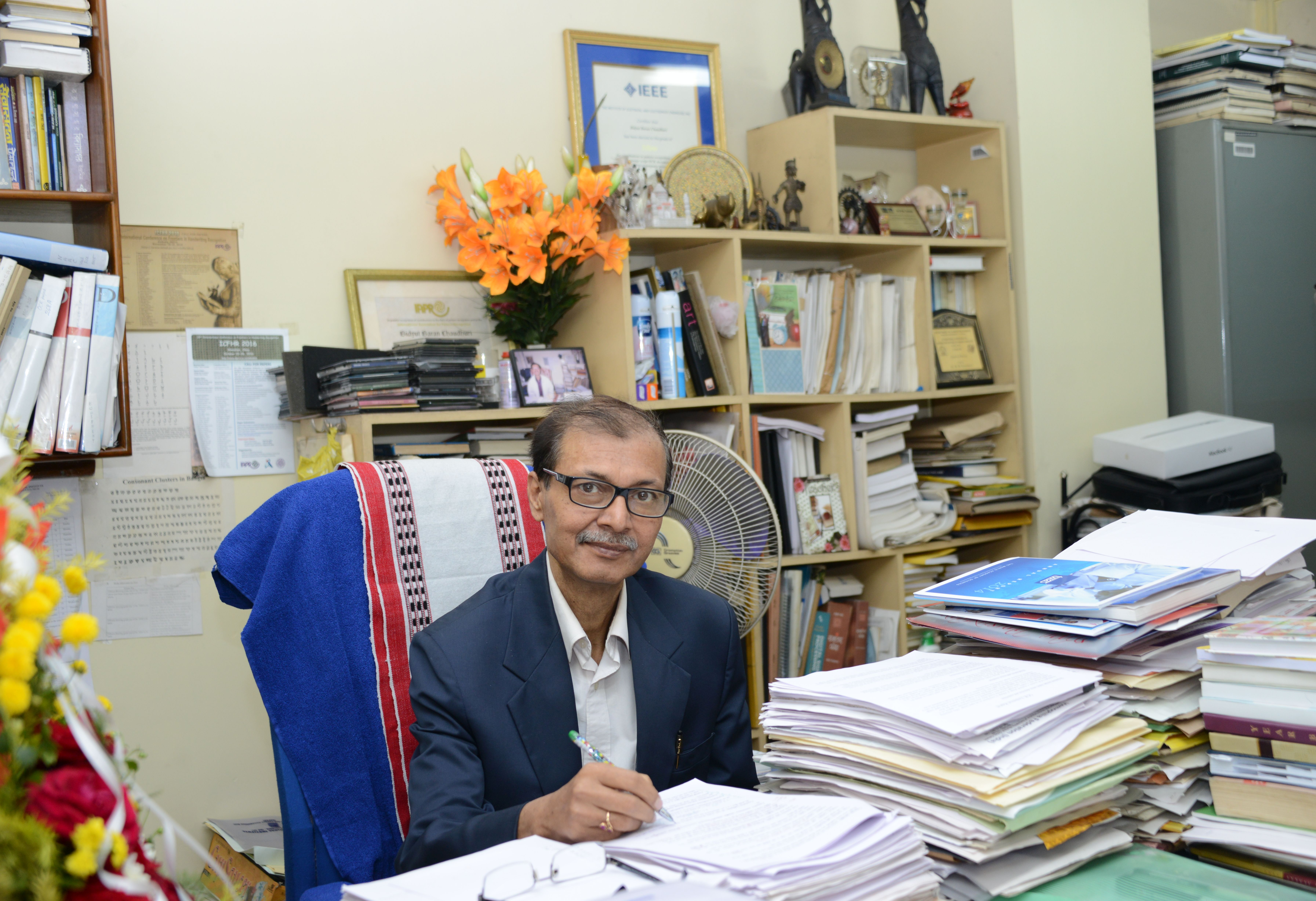
- Chaudhuri in ISI at his Office, 2015
- Born: 1950 (age 75–76)
- Education: University of Calcutta; Indian Institute of Technology Kanpur
- Known for: Optical character recognition; Computer vision; Pattern recognition; Natural language processing
- Awards: IEEE Life Fellow (2016), IEEE Fellow (2001), IAPR Fellow (1998), TWAS Fellow (2011), Om Prakash Bhasin Award (2011)
- Scientific career
- Fields: Computer science
- Workplaces: Indian Statistical Institute
- Website: www.isical.ac.in/~bbc/

Bidyut Baran Chaudhuri (B. B. Chauduri) is a senior computer scientist and an emeritus professor of Techno India University in West Bengal, India. He is also adjuncted to Indian Statistical Institute, where he was a professor for about three decades. He was the founding Head of Computer Vision and Pattern Recognition Unit (which was established in 1994) of ISI. Moreover, he was a J.C. Bose Fellow and Indian National Academy of Engineering Distinguished Professor at ISI.

He was the vice-president of the Society for Natural Language Technology Research (SNLTR).

His primary research contributes to the fields of computer vision, image processing and pattern recognition. He is a pioneer of "Indian language script OCR".

== Education ==
Chaudhuri received his BSc (Hons.), BTech and MTech degrees from University of Calcutta, India in 1969, 1972 and 1974, respectively and PhD Degree from Indian Institute of Technology Kanpur in 1980. He did his post-doc work during 1981-1982 from Queen's University, U.K, through Leverhulme Overseas Fellowship.

He also worked as a visiting faculty at Tech University, Hannover during 1986-87 as well as at GSF Institute of Radiation Protection (now Leibnitz Institute), Munich in 1990 and 1992.

== Awards and recognition ==
Chaudhuri has been elected as a Life Fellow of IEEE "for contributions to pattern recognition, especially Indian language script OCR, document processing and natural language processing". He has become a Fellow of International Association for Pattern Recognition (IAPR) "for contributions to character recognition and speech synthesis in Indian language". He is also Fellow of The World Academy of Sciences (TWAS), Indian National Science Academy (INSA), Indian National Academy of Engineering (INAE), National Academy of Sciences (NASI), and Institute of Electronics and Telecommunication Engineering (IETE). In 2011, Chaudhuri received the Om Prakash Bhasin Award for his contribution in the field of electronics and information technology.

Chaudhuri's interview on some of his works has been reported in Indian newspaper as well.

He is within world's top 2% scientists and top-10 Indian AI scientists according to a study conducted by Stanford University. He has also been featured as top-10 machine learning researcher from India.
