= Indian Statistical Institute =

Research Institution in Kolkata, India

- Motto: bhinneṣvaikyasya darśanam
- Motto in English: Unity in diversity
- Acronym: ISI
- Type: Public university
- Established: 17 December 1931; 94 years ago
- Founder: Prasanta Chandra Mahalanobis
- Academic affiliations: AIU; INI
- Budget: ₹349.39 crore (US$36.3 million) (2025–26)
- Chairman: Koppillil Radhakrishnan
- President: Sankar Kumar Pal
- Director: Amartya Kumar Dutta
- Faculty: 244 (2025)
- Students: 1,513 (2025)
- Undergraduates: 406 (2025)
- Postgraduates: 835 (2025)
- Doctoral students: 272 (2025)
- Location: Kolkata, West Bengal, India; 22°38′55.25″N 88°18′39.5″E
- Campus: Metropolis
- Other campuses: Chennai; Delhi; Bengaluru; Tezpur; Hyderabad; Pune; Giridih; Mumbai
- Journal: The Indian Journal of Statistics
- Colors: Navy Blue
- Website: www.isical.ac.in/index

The Indian Statistical Institute (ISI) is a premier and internationally acclaimed Indian research, teaching and training institute headquartered in Kolkata, India with centers in Chennai, Bengaluru, New Delhi and Tezpur. It was declared an Institute of National Importance by the Government of India under the Indian Statistical Institute Act, 1959. Established in 1931, it functions under the Ministry of Statistics and Programme Implementation of the Government of India.

Primary activities of ISI are research and training in statistics, development of theoretical statistics and its applications in various natural and social sciences. Key areas of research at ISI are statistics, mathematics, theoretical computer science, information science and mathematical economics.

Apart from the degree courses, ISI offers a few diploma and certificate courses, special diploma courses for international students via ISEC, and special courses in collaboration with CSO for training probationary officers of Indian Statistical Service (ISS).

== History ==
ISI's origin can be traced back to the Statistical Laboratory in Presidency College, Kolkata, set up by Mahalanobis, who worked in the Physics Department of the college in the 1920s. During 1913–1915, he did his Tripos in Mathematics and Physics at the University of Cambridge, where he came across Biometrika, a journal of statistics founded by Karl Pearson. Since 1915, he taught physics at Presidency College, but his interest in statistics grew under the guidance of polymath Brajendranath Seal. Many colleagues of Mahalanobis took an interest in statistics and the group grew in the Statistical Laboratory. Considering the extensive application of statistics in solving various problems in real life such as analyzing multivariate anthropometric data, applying sample surveys as a method of data collection, analyzing meteorological data, estimating crop yield etc., this group, particularly, Mahalanobis and his younger colleagues S. S. Bose and H. C. Sinha felt the necessity of forming a specialized institute to facilitate research and learning of statistics.

On 17 December 1931, Mahalonobis held a meeting with Pramatha Nath Banerji (Minto Professor of Economics), Nikhil Ranjan Sen (Khaira Professor of Applied Mathematics) and Sir Rajendra Nath Mookerjee. This meeting led to the establishment of the Indian Statistical Institute (ISI), which was formally registered on 28 April 1932, as a non-profit distributing learned society under the Societies Registration Act XXI of 1860. Later, the institute was registered under the West Bengal Societies Registration Act XXVI of 1961, amended in 1964. Mukherjee accepted the role of the president of ISI and held this position until his death in 1936. In 1953, ISI was relocated to a property owned by Professor Mahalanobis, named "Amrapali", in Baranagar, which is now a municipality at the northern outskirts of Kolkata.

In 1931, Mahalanobis was the only person working at ISI, and he managed it with an annual expenditure of Rs. 250. It gradually grew with the pioneering work of a group of his colleagues including S. S. Bose, Samarendra Kumar Mitra (Head of the Computing Machines and Electronics Laboratory and designer of India's first computer), J. M. Sengupta, Raj Chandra Bose, Samarendra Nath Roy, K. R. Nair, R. R. Bahadur, Gopinath Kallianpur, D. B. Lahiri, and Anil Kumar Gain. Pitamber Pant, who had received training in statistics at the institute, went on to become a secretary to the first prime minister of India, Jawaharlal Nehru, and was a great source of help and support to the institute.

The institute started a training section in 1938. In due course, many of the early workers left the ISI for careers in the United States or for positions in the public and private sectors in India. By the 1940s, the ISI was internationally known and was taken as a model when the first institute of statistics was set up in the United States by Gertrude Cox – perhaps the only time an institute in a developing country was used as a model in a developed country.

As asked by the government of India, in 1950, ISI designed and planned a comprehensive socio–economic national sample survey covering rural India. The organisation named National Sample Survey (NSS) was founded in 1950 for conducting this survey. The field work was performed by the Directorate of NSS, functioning under the Ministry of Finance, whereas the other tasks such as planning of the survey, training of field workers, review, data processing and tabulation were executed by ISI. In 1961, the Directorate of NSS started functioning under the Department of Statistics of government of India, and later in 1971, the design and analysis wing of NSS was shifted from ISI to the Department of Statistics forming the National Sample Survey Organisation (NSSO).

J. B. S. Haldane joined the ISI as a research professor from August 1957, and stayed on until February 1961, when he had a falling out with ISI Director P.C. Mahalanobis over Haldane's going on a much-publicized hunger strike to protest the United States pressuring U.S. National Science Fair winners Gary Botting and Susan Brown from attending an ISI banquet to which many prominent Indian scientists had been invited. Haldane helped the ISI grow in biometrics. Haldane also played a key role in developing the structure and content of the courses offered by ISI.

Until 1959, ISI was associated with the University of Calcutta. By 'The Indian Statistical Institute Act 1959' of the Parliament of India, amended in 1995, ISI was declared an institute of national importance, and was authorised to hold examinations and to grant degrees and diplomas in Statistics, Mathematics, Computer Science, Quantitative Economics, and in any other subject related to statistics as identified by the institute from time to time. ISI is a public university, as the same act also states that ISI would be funded by the Central Government of India.

ISI had by the 1960s started establishing special service units in New Delhi, Chennai, Bangalore, Mumbai and Hyderabad to provide consultancy services to business, industry and governmental public service organisations in the areas of statistical process control, operations research and industrial engineering. Additionally, Bangalore had a Documentation Research and Training Centre (DRTC). In the early 1970s, the Delhi and Bangalore units were converted to teaching centres. In 2008, ISI Chennai was upgraded to a teaching centre. In 2011, ISI added a new centre in Tezpur.

== Campuses ==
The major objectives of the ISI are to facilitate research and training of Statistics, to indulge in development of statistical theory and in application of statistical techniques – in the scenarios of planning at national level and in theoretical development of natural and social sciences, to participate in the process of data collection and analysis, to operate related projects in planning and improvement of efficiency of management and production.

The Sanskrit phrase भिन्नेष्वैक्यस्य दर्शणम् (Bhinneswaykyasya Darshanam), which literally means the philosophy of unity in diversity, is incorporated in the logo of the institute, and is the motto of ISI. ISI Kolkata is the headquarter with centers at Chennai, Bengaluru, Hyderabad, New Delhi. Tezpur, the 4th center of ISI was inaugurated in 2011.

Indian Statistical Institute
Center	City	State	Founded	Type	Notes
ISI Kolkata	Kolkata	West Bengal	1931	HQ	Incepted and started as Department of Statistics at Presidency University, Kolkata (then Presidency College)
ISI Chennai	Chennai	Tamil Nadu	1960	Centre	
ISI Bangalore	Bengaluru	Karnataka	1966	Centre	Started as unit in 1954
ISI Hyderabad	Hyderabad	Telangana	1974	Centre	The second year of the MSQMS course is conducted here.
ISI Delhi	New Delhi	Delhi	1974	Centre	
ISI Tezpur	Tezpur	Assam	2011	Centre	

=== ISI, Kolkata ===
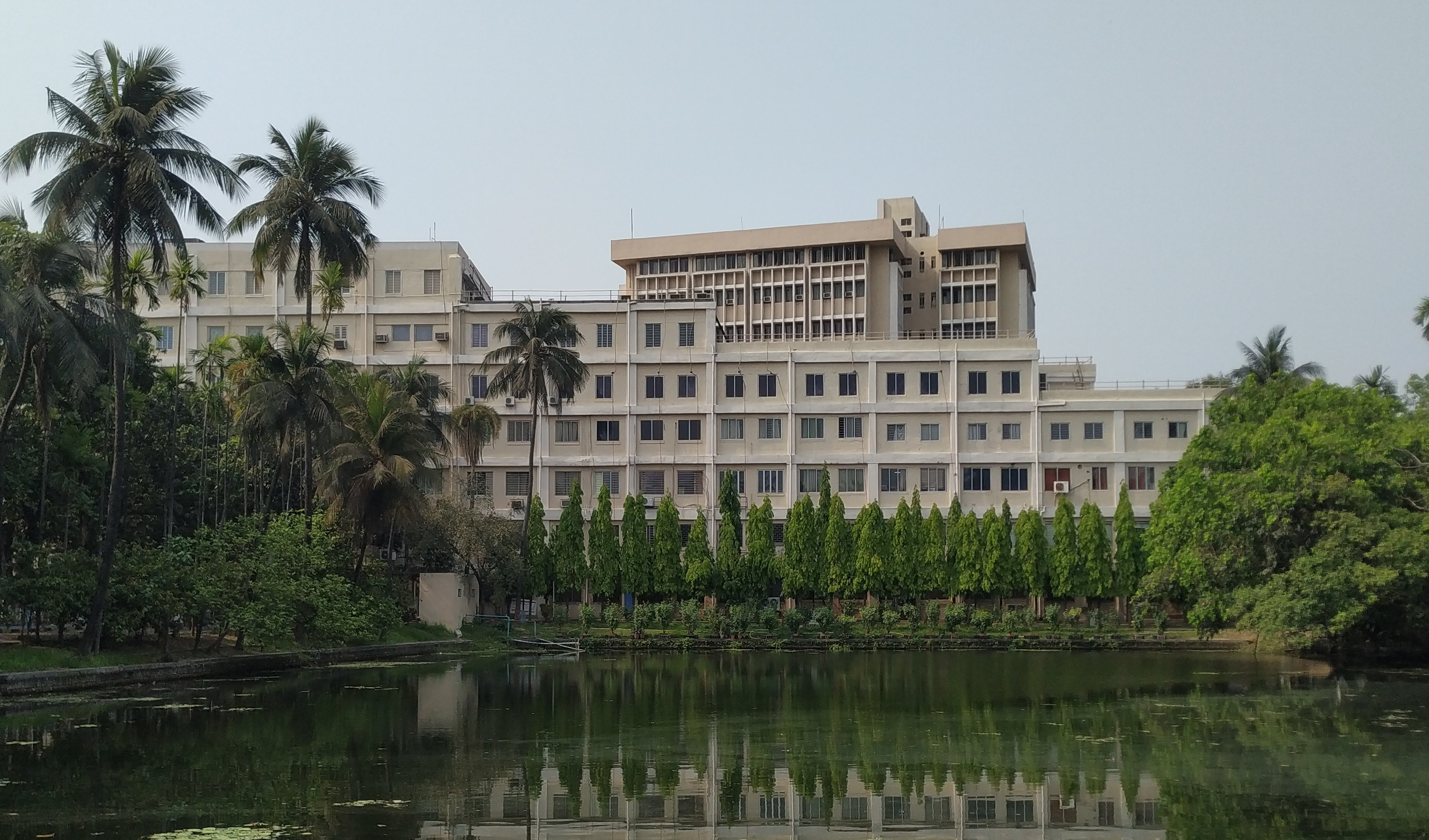
Main Building of the Indian Statistical Institute, Kolkata

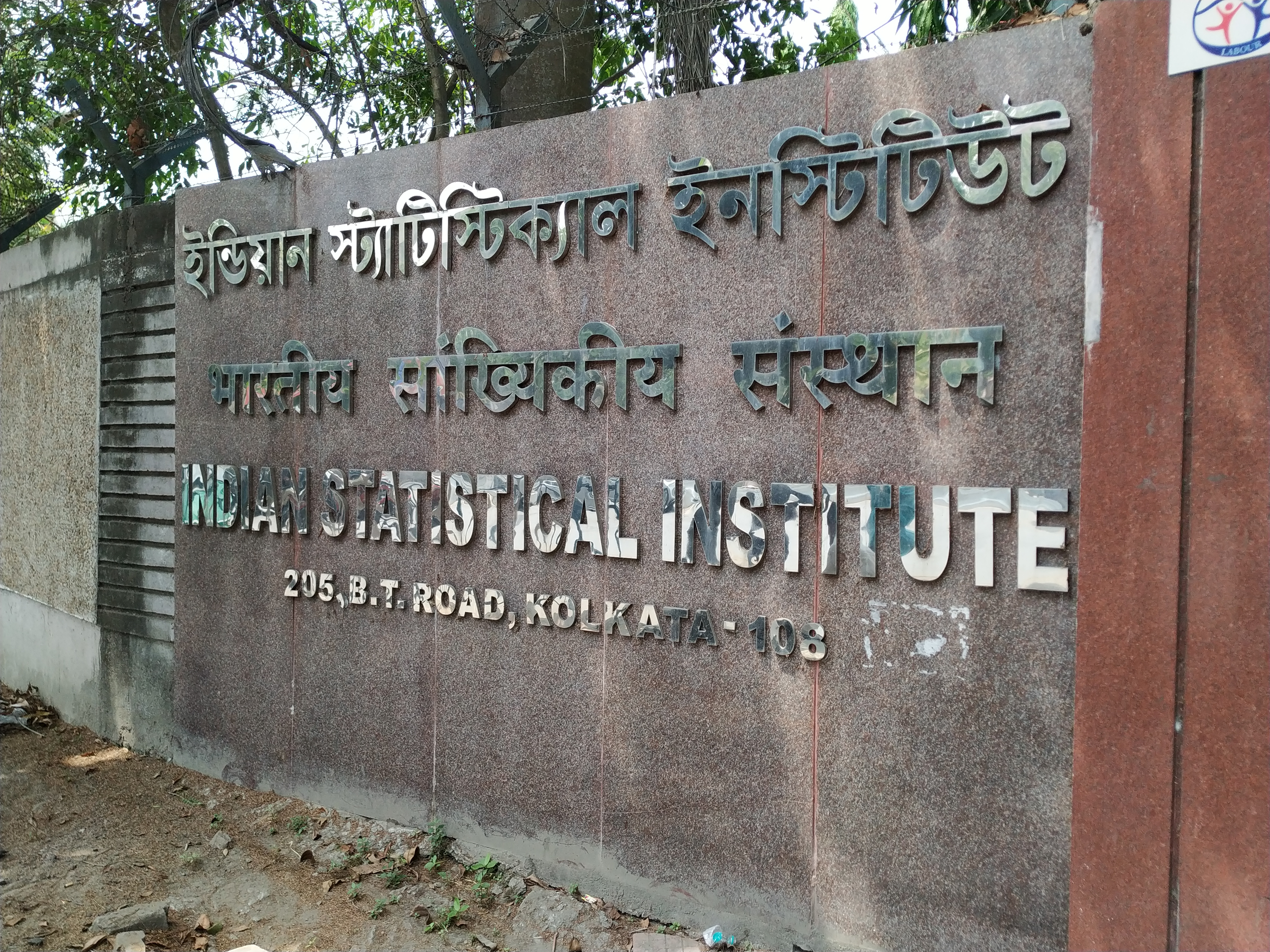
ISI Kolkata board on the gate 205.

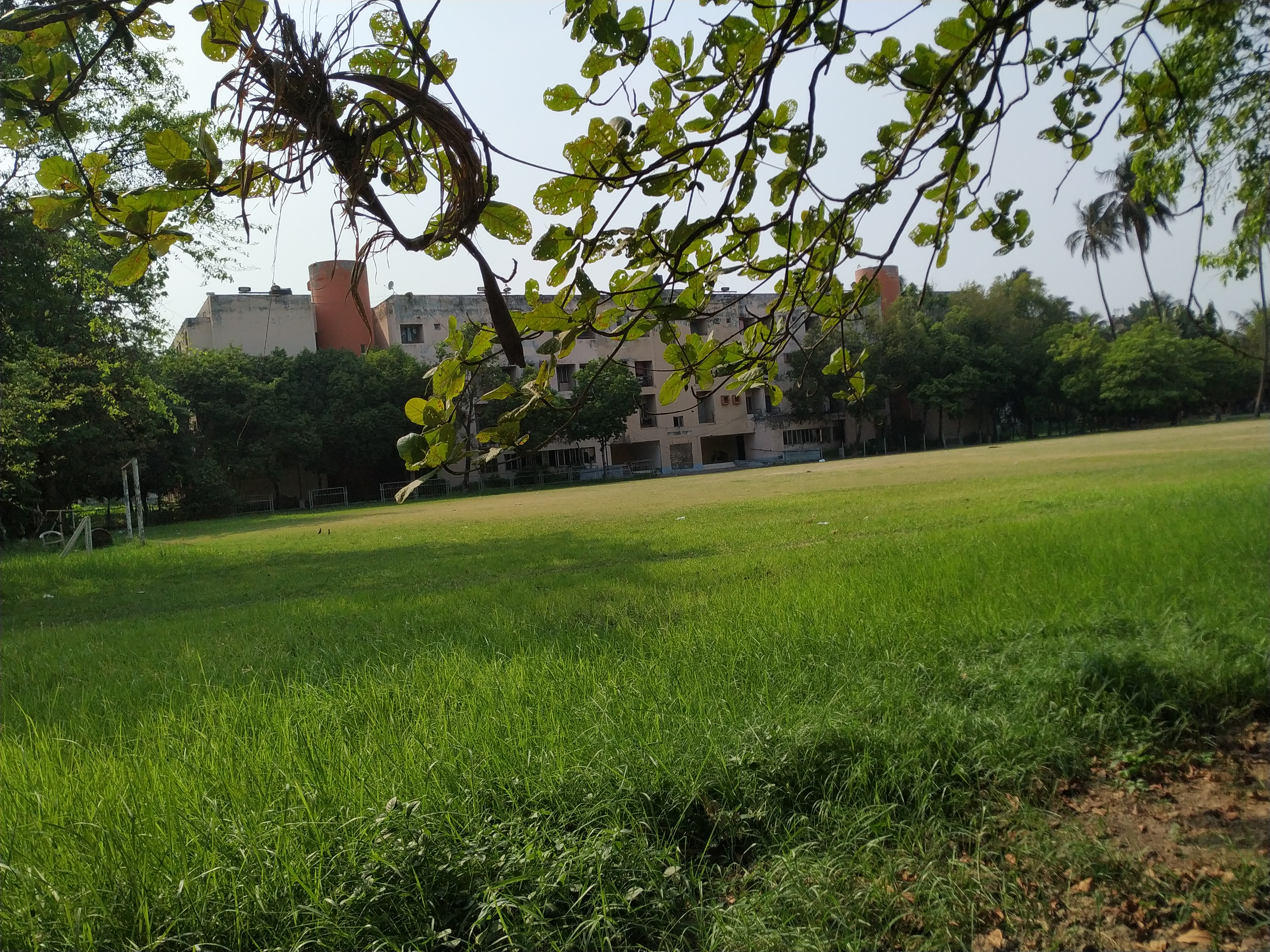
CV Raman Hall, ISI Kolkata.

ISI Kolkata has a campus consisting of six addresses at 201 through 206 Barrackpore Trunk Road, Bonhooghly (Baranagar).

ISI Kolkata campus is eco-friendly, as conceived by Mahalanobis. Hollow bricks that protect from heat and noise were used with minimum use of reinforced concrete, to avoid radiation. There was no use of bitumen-basalt combination at the roads inside ISI campuses. This helps in reduction of radiation and preservation of rain-water to maintain equilibrium in ground-water level.

The Kolkata campus offers bachelor's level degree course in Statistics (B. Stat), Statistical Data Science (BSDS), master's degree course in Statistics (M.Stat), Mathematics (M.Math), Computer Science (MTech), Cryptology & Security (MTech), Quality Reliability and Operations Research (MTech) and Quantitative Economics (M.S.). Major divisions and units are: Statistics and Mathematics Unit (SMU), Human Genetics Unit (HGU), Physics and Applied Mathematics Unit (PAMU), Geological Studies Unit (GSU), Advanced Computation and MicroElectronics Unit (ACMU), Computer Vision and Pattern Recognition Unit (CVPRU), Machine Intelligence Unit (MIU), Electronics and Communication Sciences Unit (ECSU), Applied Statistics Unit (ASU), Economic Research Unit (ERU), Linguistic Research Unit (LRU), Sociology Research Unit (SRU), Psychometry Research Unit (PRU) and Population Studies Unit (PSU).

The Kolkata campus houses the International Statistical Education Centre (ISEC), which opened in 1950. This centre provides training in statistics to sponsored students mainly from the Middle East, South and South East Asia, the Far East and the Commonwealth Countries of Africa. The centre also offers various short-term courses in statistics and related subjects.

The Center for Soft Computing Research: A National Facility, an associate institute of Indian Statistical Institute and established in Kolkata in 2005, is unique in the country. Apart from conducting basic research, it offers a 3-month course and promotes less endowed institutes by providing fellowships and research grants.

The Central Library of ISI is located at Kolkata with branches at the other facilities. The library has over 200,000 volumes of books and journals with a special emphasis on the field of statistics and related studies. The main branch also has a collection of official reports, reprints, maps, and microfilms. The library receives over a thousand new technical and scientific journals every year. The library has databases on CD-ROM and is working on further digitization of the collection. The library has a separate collection of works on the topics of mathematics and statistics called the Eastern Regional Centre of NBHM collection, funded by grants from the National Board for Higher Mathematics. It also looks to set up research unit in artificial intelligence.

=== ISI, Delhi Campus ===
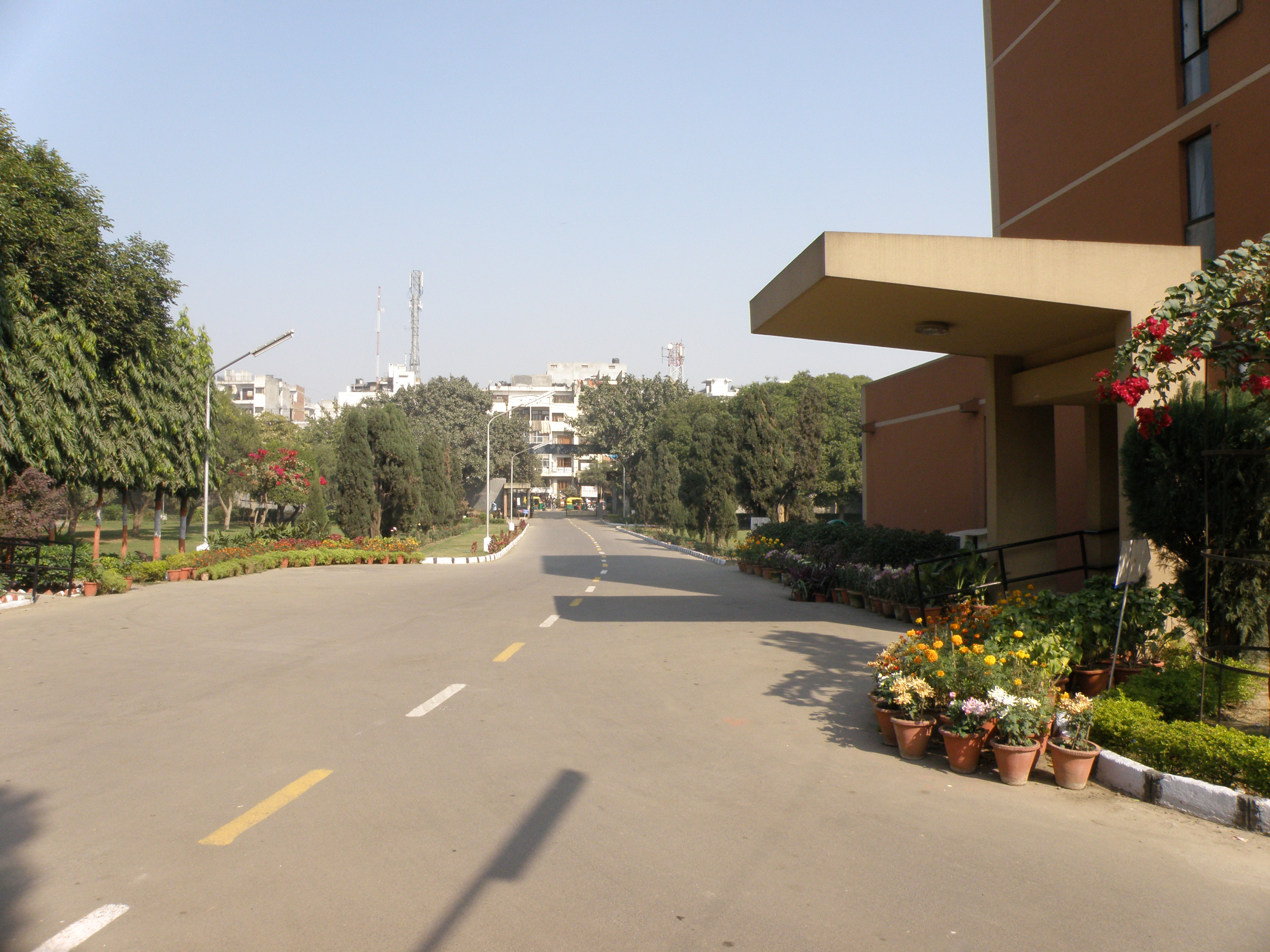
Main road inside the Institute

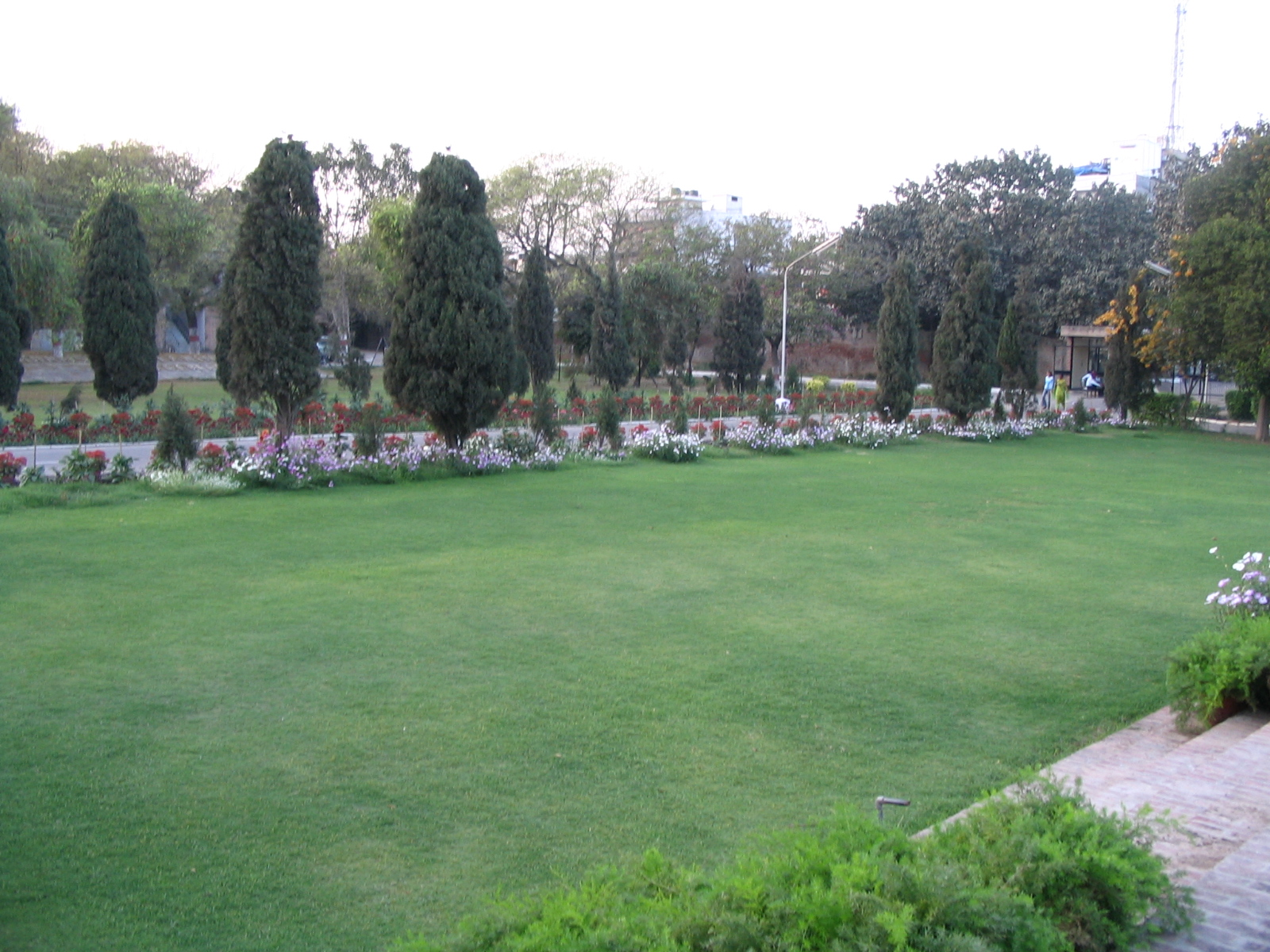
Gardens near the main entrance

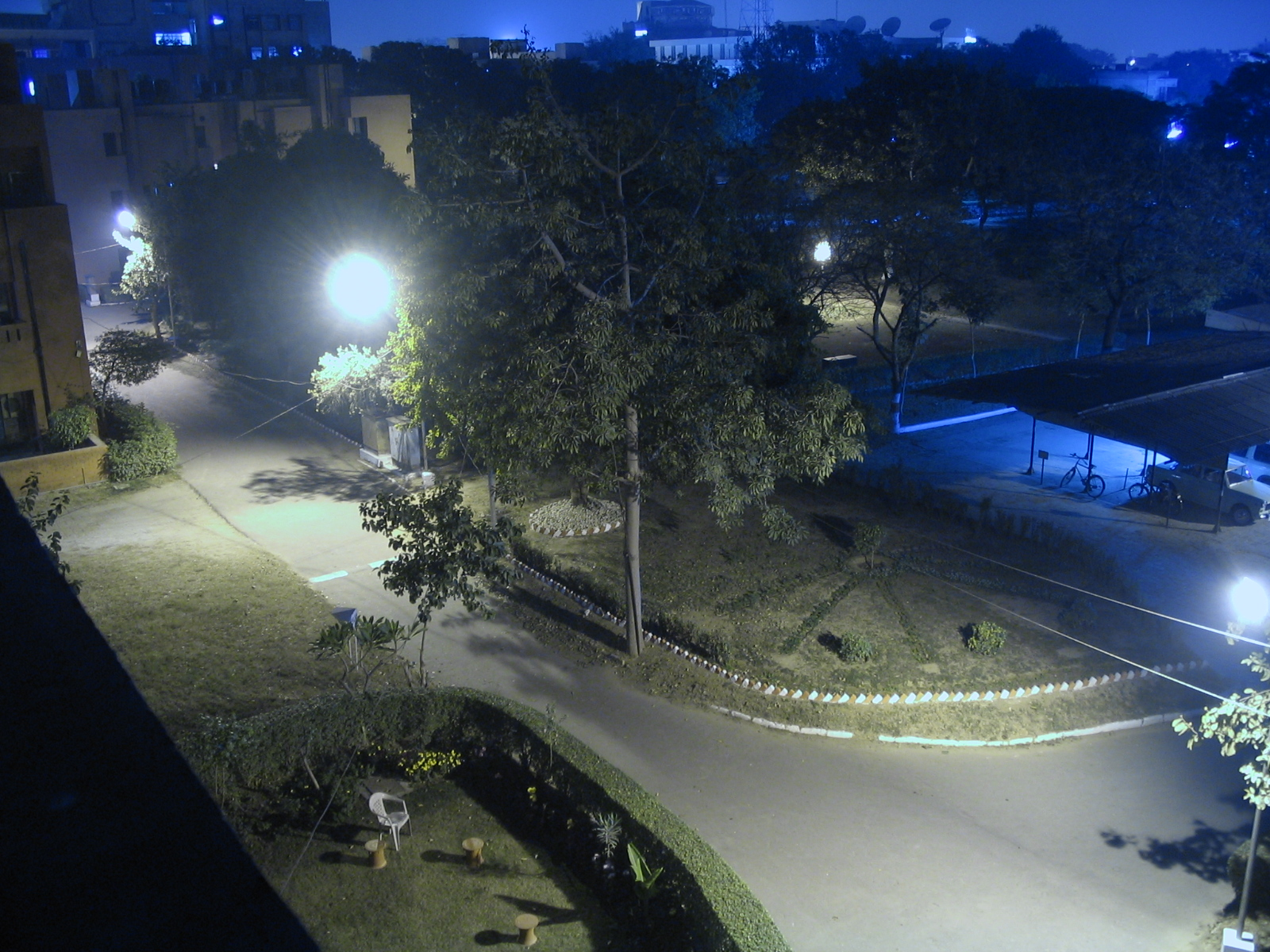
Night view of the campus

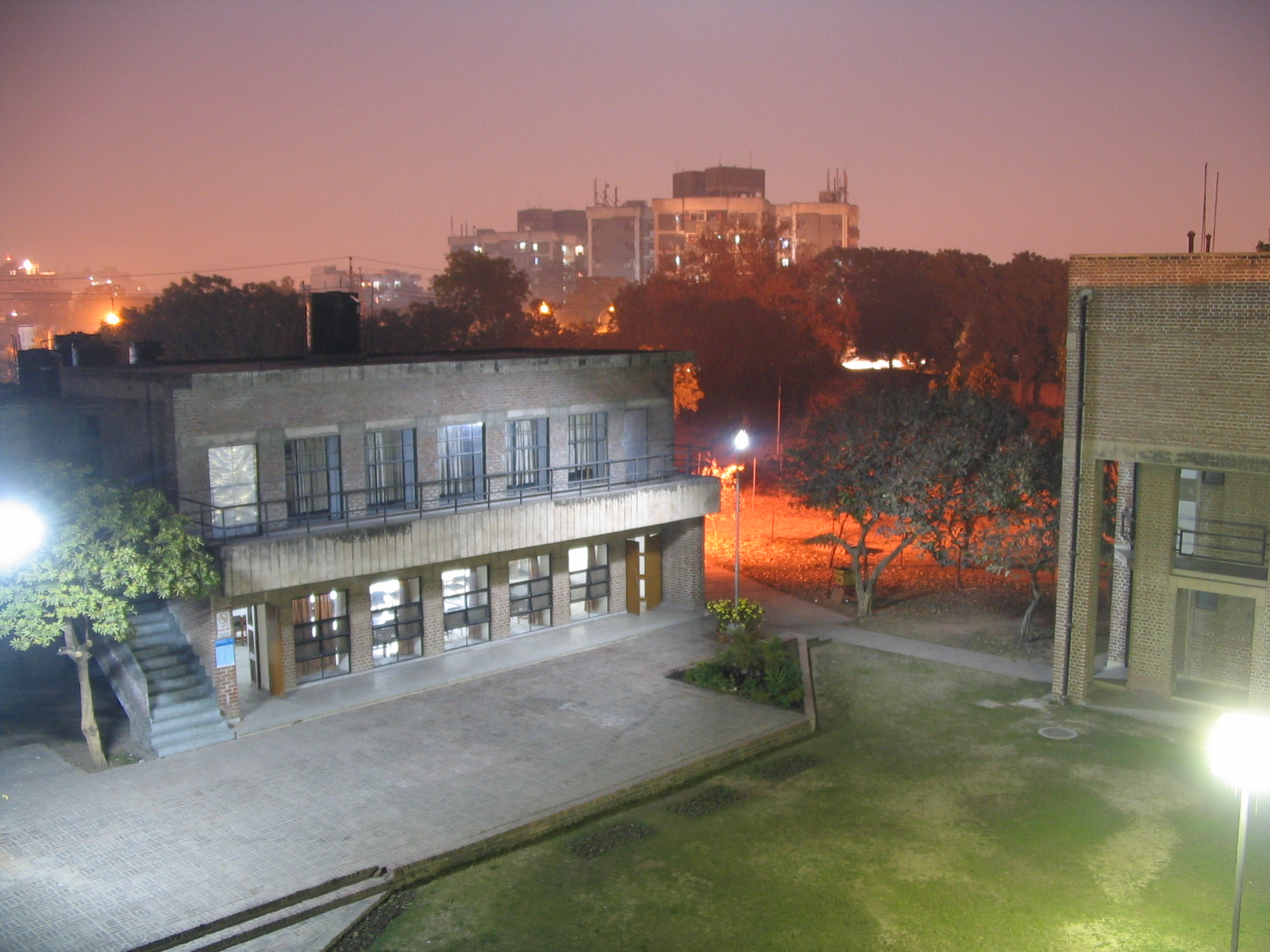
Canteen

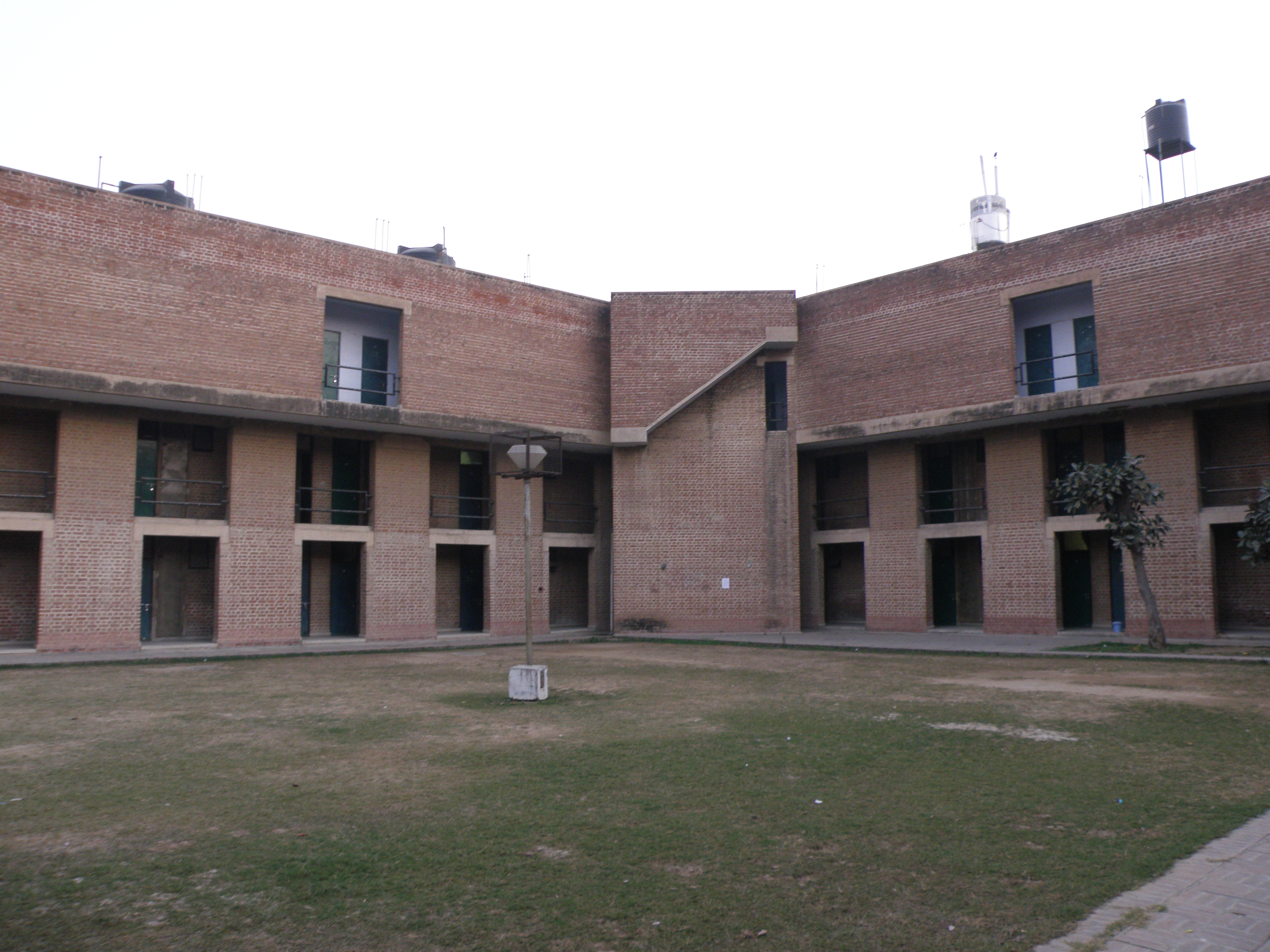
Hostel

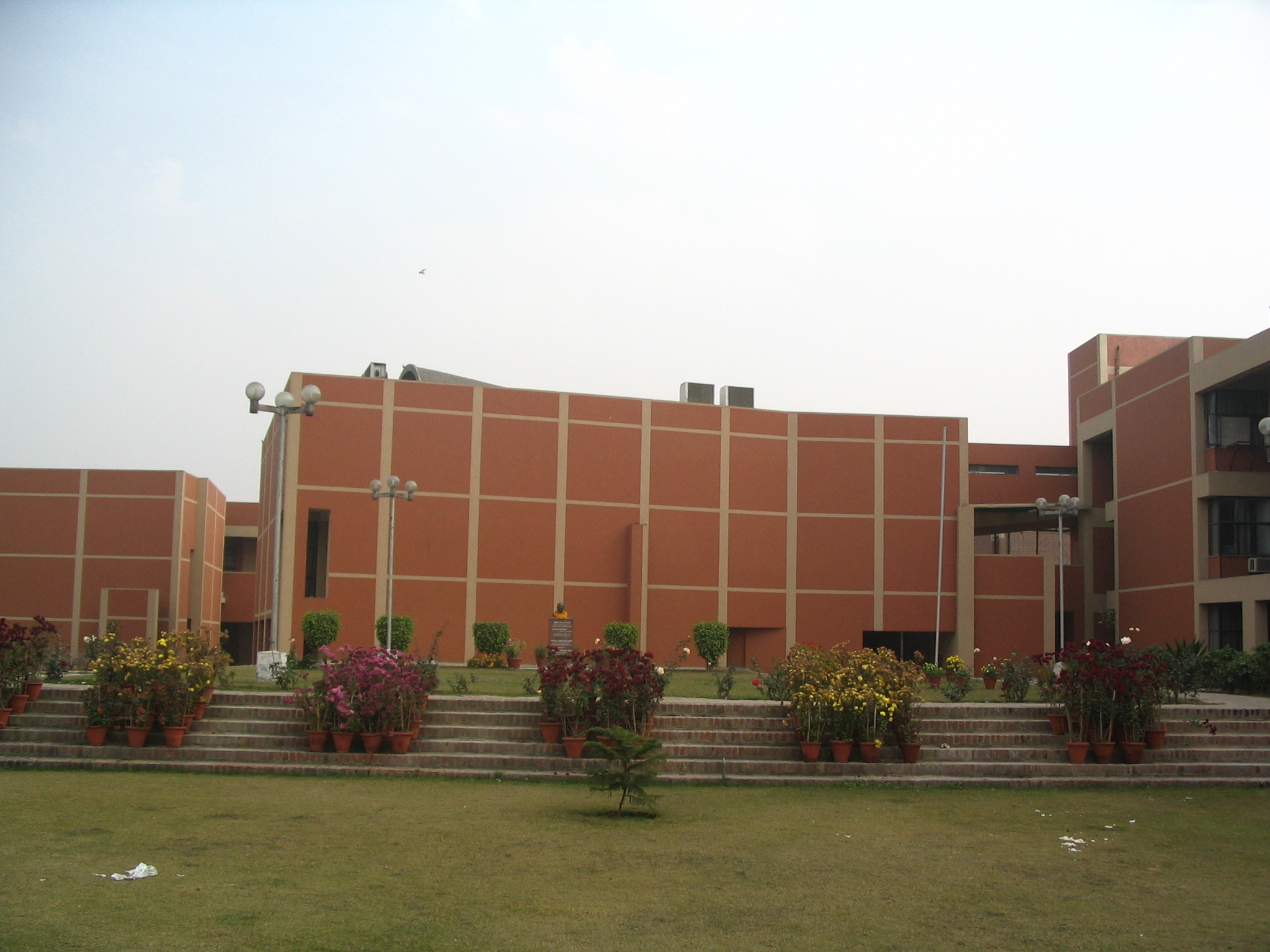
Library

The ISI campus at New Delhi was established in 1974 and was shifted to the present campus in 1975.

The Delhi campus offers Bachelor of Statistical Data Science (BSDS), Master of Science in Quantitative Economics (MSQE), Master of Statistics (MStat) and doctoral programs.

=== ISI, Bangalore ===
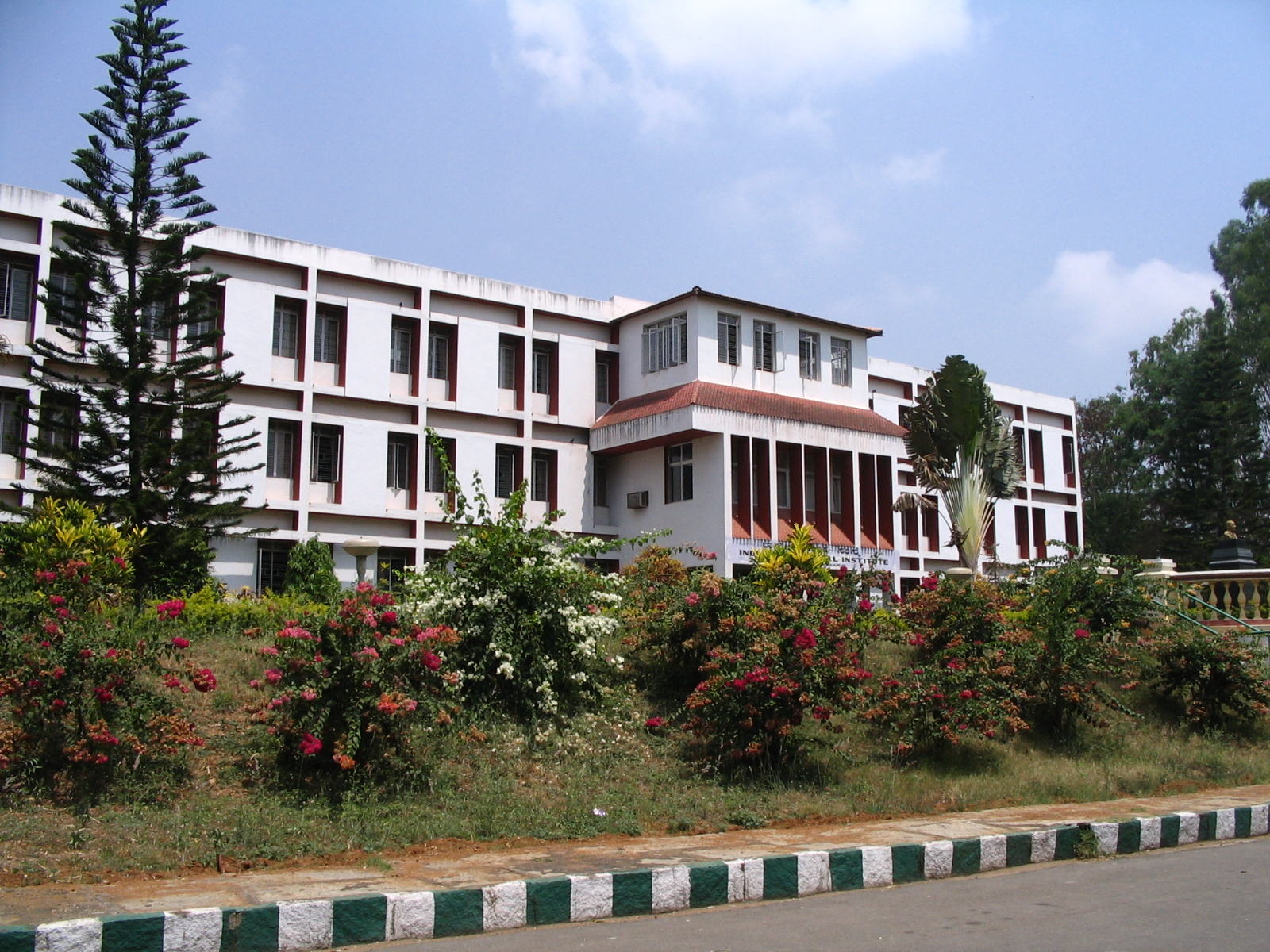
Main building

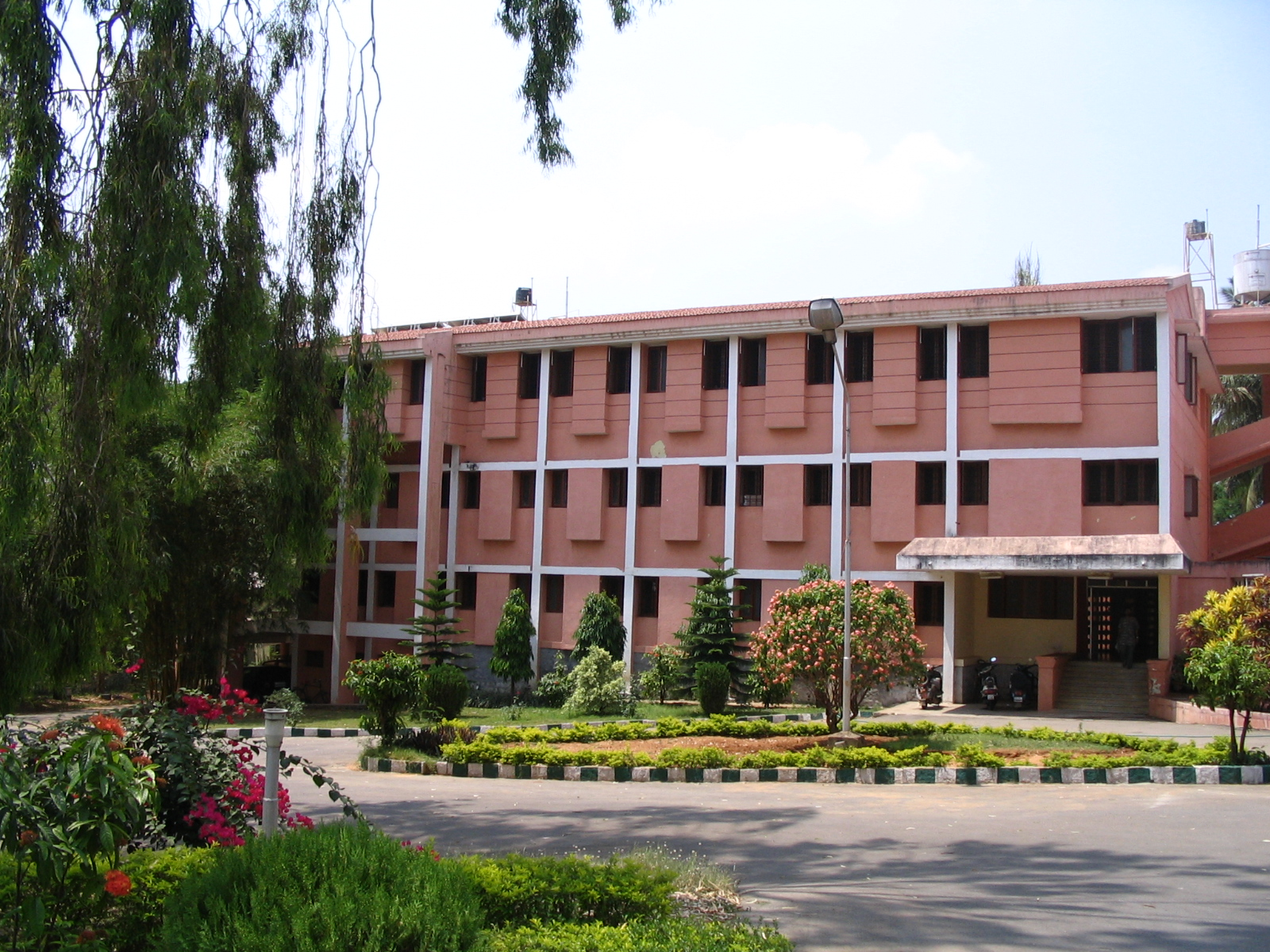
Main hostel

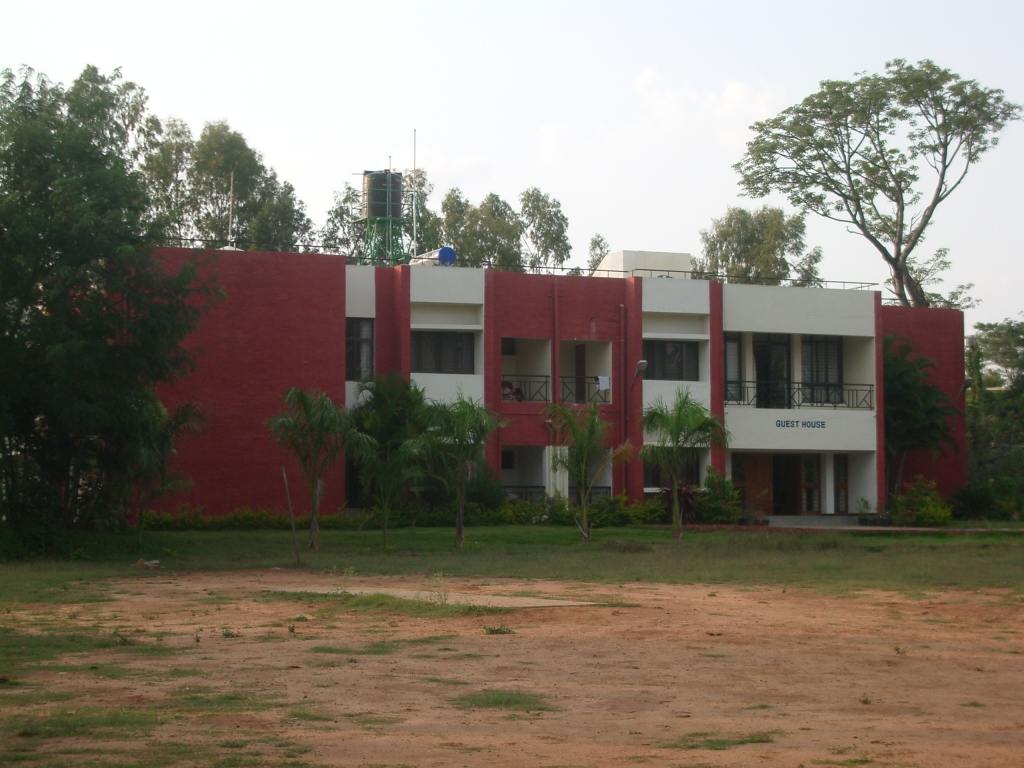
Guest House

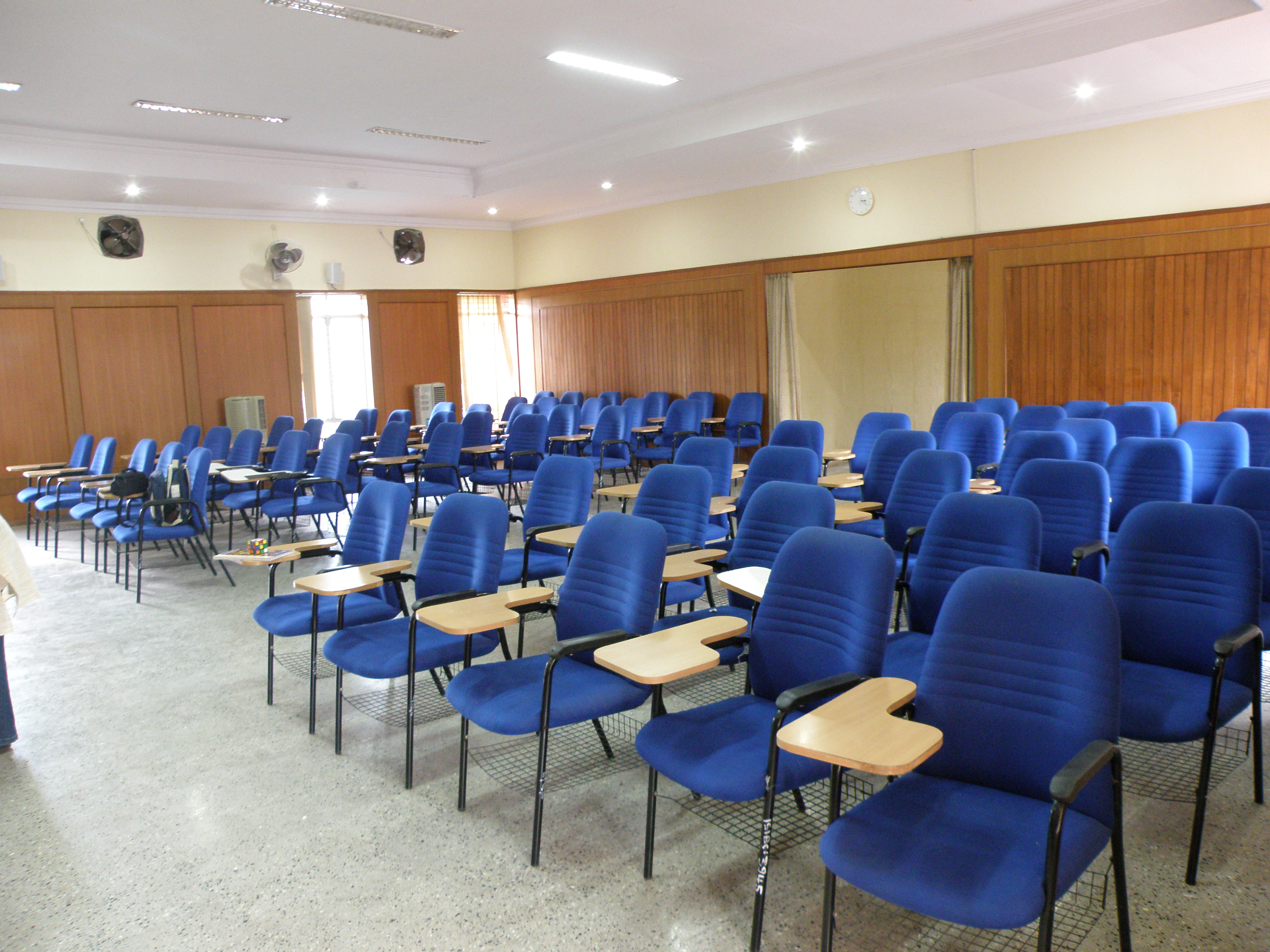
Auditorium

The Bengaluru centre of ISI started with a Statistical Quality Control and Operations Research (SQC & OR) unit in 1954. The Documentation Research and Training Centre (DRTC) here became operational from 1962 with honorary professor S. R. Ranganathan as the head. Prof. Mahalanobis planned of starting a full-fledged centre of ISI here around the mid-sixties. In 1966, the then Government of Karnataka granted ISI 30 acres of forest land full of eucalyptus trees, next to the upcoming campus of the Bangalore University, located on the Mysore Road on the outskirts of the city.

However, after death of Prof. Mahalanobis in 1972, the project of establishing Bengaluru centre got temporarily shelved. The project was again revived during 1976–78. Concrete proposals were made to the Government of India to get grants for the development of the land already in possession of ISI, along with the construction of an academic block with a library and offices.

In the meantime, a building was rented on Church Street, in Bengaluru downtown, and various activities of the Bengaluru centre started in September 1978. The Economic Analysis Unit (EAU) and the Statistics and Mathematics Unit were established. The SQC&OR Unit and the DRTC unit, which were functioning from other rented buildings at that time, joined this new Centre.

As construction of the administrative block at the new campus got completed, the various units moved to the new campus in May 1985.

The Bengaluru centre was formally declared as a centre of ISI in September 1996.

The Systems Science and Informatics Unit (SSIU) was established in 2009

The Bengaluru centre has by now became an institution for academic activities in Mathematics, Statistics, Computer Science, SQC and Operations Research, Library and Information Science, and Quantitative Economics.

The Bengaluru campus offers bachelor level course Bachelor of Statistical Data Science (BSDS), Bachelor of Mathematics (B.Math), master level courses Master of Mathematics (M.Math), Master of Science (M. S.) in Library and Information Science and Master of Science (M. S.) in Quality Management Science, and doctoral programs.

== Academics ==
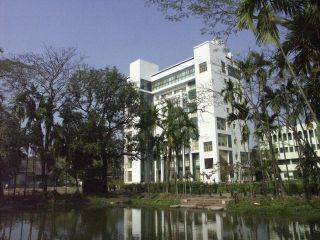
New Academic Building, ISI Kolkata

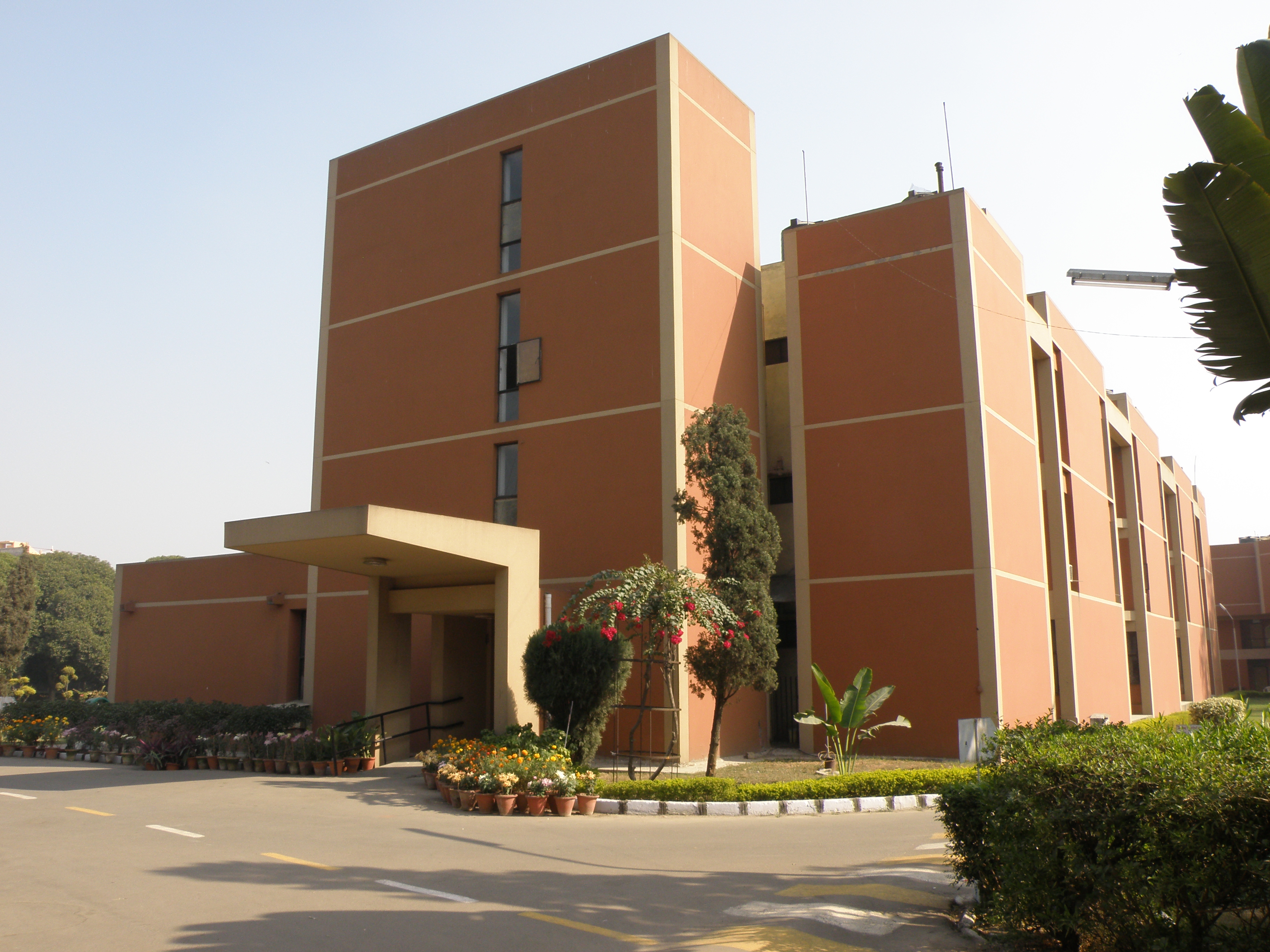
Main building, ISI Delhi Campus

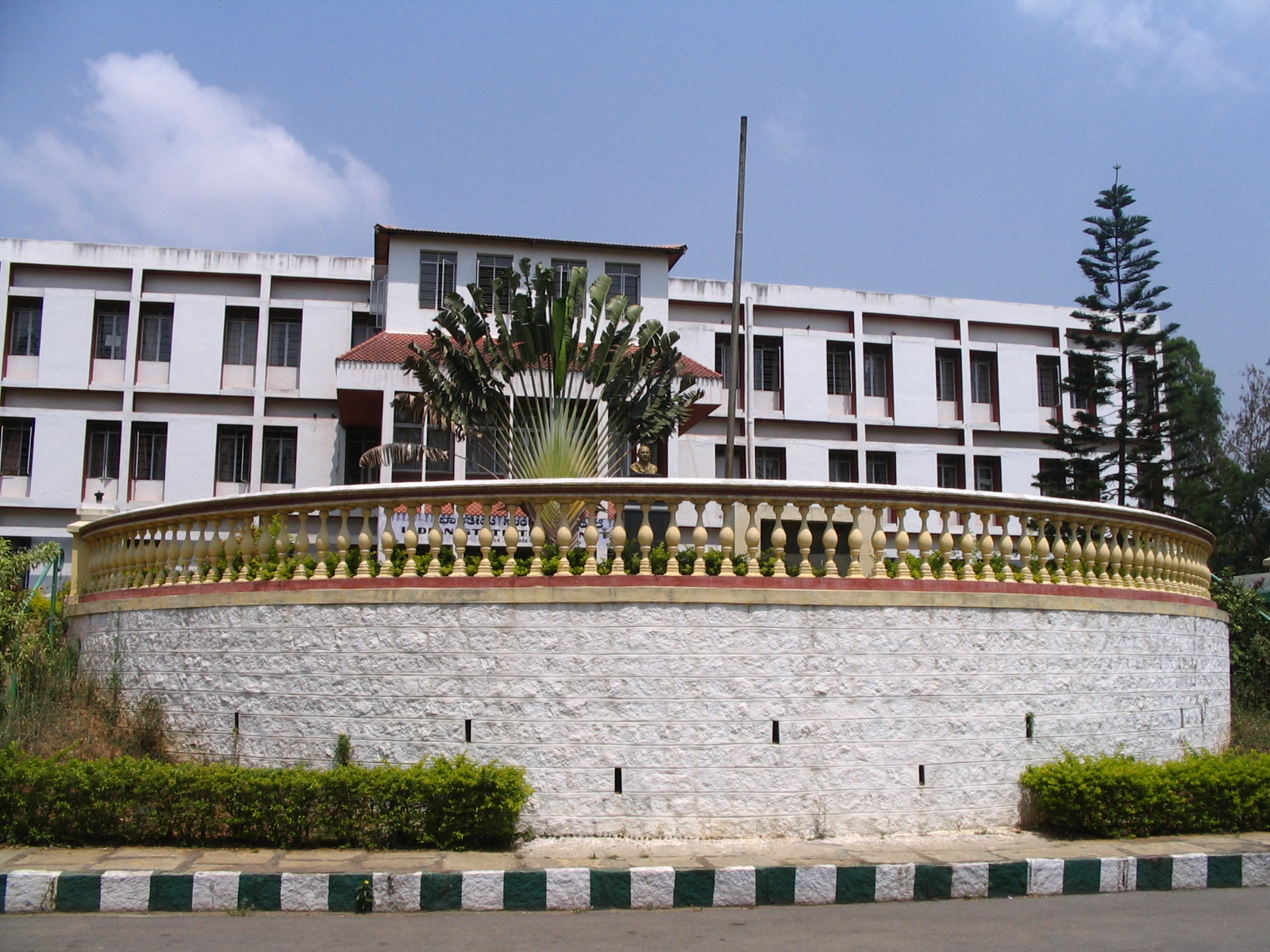
Main building, ISI Bangalore Campus

Traditionally, ISI offers fewer programs (and admits fewer students) than most other degree granting academic institutions. Following the empowerment for granting degrees in the subject of Statistics as per the ISI Act 1959, in 1960, ISI initiated bachelor level degree program Bachelor of Statistics and master level degree course Master of Statistics, and also began awarding research level degrees such as PhD and DSc. Later, ISI started offering Master of Technology (MTech) courses in Computer Science and in Quality, Reliability & Operations Research (QR&OR); these courses got recognition from All India Council for Technical Education (AICTE). As ISI Act of 1959 was amended by the Parliament of India in 1995, ISI was empowered to confer degrees and diplomas in subjects such as Mathematics, Quantitative Economics, Computer Science, and other subjects related to Statistics and Operations Research as determined by ISI from time to time. Apart from the degree courses, ISI offers few diploma and certificate courses, special diploma courses for international students via ISEC, and special courses in collaboration with CSO for training probationary officers of Indian Statistical Service (ISS).

=== Research Divisions and Centers ===
Division	Units
Statistical Sciences	Applied and Official Statistics Unit, TEZPUR; Applied Statistics Unit, KOLKATA; Applied Statistics Unit, CHENNAI; Interdisciplinary Statistical Research Unit, KOLKATA; Sampling and Official Statistics Unit, KOLKATA; Statistical Sciences Unit, DELHI
Biological Sciences	Agricultural and Ecological Research Unit, KOLKATA; Agricultural and Ecological Research Unit, GIRIDIH; Biological Anthropology Unit, KOLKATA; Human Genetics Unit, KOLKATA
Computer and Communication Sciences	Advanced Computing and Microelectronics Unit, KOLKATA; Computer Vision and Pattern Recognition Unit, KOLKATA; Cryptology and Security Research Unit, KOLKATA; Computer Science Unit, CHENNAI; Electronics and Communication Sciences Unit, KOLKATA; Machine Intelligence Unit, KOLKATA; Systems Science and Informatics Unit, BANGALORE
Physics and Earth Sciences	Geological Studies Unit, KOLKATA; Physics and Applied Mathematics Unit, KOLKATA; Theoretical and Applied Sciences Unit, TEZPUR
Theoretical Statistics and Mathematics	Theoretical Statistics and Mathematics Unit, KOLKATA; Theoretical Statistics and Mathematics Unit, BANGALORE; Theoretical Statistics and Mathematics Unit, CHENNAI; Theoretical Statistics and Mathematics Unit, DELHI
Social Sciences	Documentation Research and Training Centre, BANGALORE; Economic Research Unit, KOLKATA; Economic Analysis Unit, BANGALORE; Economics and Planning Unit, DELHI; Linguistic Research Unit, KOLKATA; Population Studies Unit, KOLKATA; Psychology Research Unit, KOLKATA; Sociological Research Unit, KOLKATA; Socio-Economic Research Unit, TEZPUR; Sociological Research Unit, GIRIDIH
Statistical Quality Control and Operations Research	SQC & OR Unit, KOLKATA; SQC & OR Unit, DELHI; SQC & OR Unit, BANGALORE; SQC & OR Unit, CHENNAI; SQC & OR Unit, MUMBAI; SQC & OR Unit, PUNE; SQC & OR Unit, HYDERABAD

- R C Bose Centre for Cryptology and Security
- Center for Soft Computing Research
- Center for Artificial Intelligence and Machine Learning
- Technology Innovation Hub
- Centre for Research on Economics and Data Analysis

=== Degree courses ===
ISI offers three undergraduate programs, viz. Bachelor of Statistics (Honours) (B.Stat), Bachelor of Mathematics (Honours) (B. Math) and Bachelor of Statistical Data Science (Honours) eight graduate programs, viz. Master of Statistics (M. Stat), Master of Mathematics (M. Math), Master of Science in Quantitative Economics (MSQE), Master of Science in Library and Information Science (MSLIS), Master of Science in Quality Management Science (MSQMS), Master of Technology in Computer Science (MTech–CS), Master of Technology in Cryptology & Security (MTech-CrS) and Master of Technology in Quality, Reliability and Operations Research (MTech–QROR).

ISI also offers four PG Diploma programs, viz. Postgraduate Diploma in Agricultural and Rural Management with Statistical Methods [PGDARSMA], Postgraduate Diploma in Statistical Methods & Analytics [PGDSMA], Post Graduate Diploma in Business Analytics [PGDBA] and PG Diploma in Applied Statistics [PGDAS].

B.Stat (Hons) and B.Math (Hons) courses are of 3 years duration, BSDS (Hons) course is of 4 years duration and the master's level courses of 2 years of duration. For all undergraduate and graduate level courses, the academic year is divided in two semesters. Except for sponsored candidates of MTech courses, ISI students are not required to pay any tuition fees. Conditional to performance beyond a threshold, all students and research fellows receive stipends, fellowships and contingency/book grants. Students demonstrating outstanding performances are rewarded at the end of the semesters. ISI campuses provide hostel accommodations with recreational facilities and limited medical facilities available free of cost.

=== Admissions ===
Applicants of all degree courses are required to go through written admission tests and/or interviews. ISI conducts the written tests at various examination centers across India. Only in few cases, candidates may get called for the interview directly, viz. applicants of MTech Computer Science course having a GATE score above a threshold. Candidates applying to doctoral research programmes who have been awarded (or qualified for) a Junior Research Fellowship by UGC / CSIR / NBHM etc. are also required to clear the ISI admission test or an equivalent separate test and interview conducted by the relevant JRF selection committee of the institute if they wish to obtain a PhD from the Indian Statistical Institute. Candidates applying to B. SDS are admitted via math percentile in JEE Main and/or CUET-UG.

=== International Statistical Education Centre ===
In 1950, ISI, in collaboration with International Statistical Institute, UNESCO and Government of India, had set up International Statistical Education Centre (ISEC) to impart knowledge of theoretical and applied statistics to participants from Middle East, East and South-East Asia, the Far East and Commonwealth countries of Africa. The main training course offered by ISEC is meant for international students, preferably graduates with proficiency in English and Mathematics. ISEC, located in Kolkata campus of ISI, functions with support from the Ministry of External Affairs and the Ministry of Statistics and Programme Implementation of the Government of India.

=== Publications ===
Sankhya, the statistical journal published by ISI, was founded in 1933, along the lines of Karl Pearson's Biometrika. Mahalanobis was the founder editor. Each volume of Sankhya consists of four issues; two of them are in Series A, containing articles on theoretical statistics, probability theory and stochastic processes, and the other two issues form the Series B, containing articles on applied statistics, i.e. applied probability, applied stochastic processes, econometrics and statistical computing.

=== Rankings ===
According to India Education Review, no Indian university is in the world's top 200 universities, as of 2012. The ascribed ranking of ISI is 186. The web ranking of this institute, according to uniRank.org, is 1693. According to the web ranking published by Webometrics Ranking of World Universities, ISI currently holds the world rank of 1352. In the subject-wise academic world ranking of Computer Science, the Indian Statistical Institute features in 101—150 category. The Indian Statistical Institute, Kolkata is ranked 2nd in Computer Science research by mean citation rate, p-Index, h-index among all universities in India. The NIRF (National Institutional Ranking Framework) ranked it 75th overall in India in 2024.

== Student life ==
=== Student Fest ===
Integration is the annual techno-cultural fest of the Indian Statistical Institute, Kolkata usually held during the first and second weekend of January each year.

Chaos is the annual techno-cultural fest of the Indian Statistical Institute, Bangalore usually held during the last weekend of March each year.

=== Placement ===
Alumni of ISI – including recipients of PhD degree – are employed in government and semi–government departments, industrial establishments, research institutions, in India and other countries. There is a placement cell in ISI Kolkata that organizes campus interviews by prospective employers in various campuses of ISI. Since recent past, a high percentage of ISI alumni gets absorbed into jobs in analytics, banking, finance and software industry.

== Statistical Quality Control and Operations Research units ==
Since mid-forties, ISI pioneered in research and application of Statistical Quality Control (SQC) in India. Walter A. Shewhart, the statistician known as the father of SQC, and other experts of this field visited ISI over the years. The first Statistical Quality Control and Operations Research (SQC & OR) unit of ISI was set up in Mumbai in 1953, followed by Bangalore and Kolkata units in 1954. In 1976, this unit was transformed into the SQC & OR Division, which now operates seven units, located at various industrial centres in India – Kolkata, Delhi, Bangalore, Chennai, Pune, Mumbai and Vadodara. These units partake in technical consultancy with public and private organisations, in addition with performing research and training activities. The branch at Giridih was set up in 1931 and it has two operational units, viz. the Sociological Research Unit and the Agricultural Research Unit.

Statistical Quality Control(SQC) and Operations Research (OR) Units
Units	City	State	Founded	Focus Area	Website	Notes
	Hyderabad	Telangana	1931		isihyd.ac.in/	
ISI Mumbai	Mumbai	Maharashtra	1953		isimumbai.co.in/	
ISI Giridih	Giridih	Jharkhand	1931	Agricultural Research Unit		
ISI Pune	Pune	Maharashtra			sqcpune.org/	
ISI Vadodara	Vadodara	Gujarat				

== Achievements ==
Over the years, researchers of ISI made fundamental contributions in various fields of Statistics such as Design of Experiments, Sample Survey, Multivariate statistics and Computer Science. Mahalanobis introduced the measure Mahalanobis distance which is used in multivariate statistics and other related fields. Raj Chandra Bose, who is known for his contributions in coding theory, worked on Design of Experiments during his tenure at ISI, and was one of the three mathematicians, who disproved Euler's conjecture on orthogonal Latin squares. Anil Kumar Bhattacharya is credited with introduction of the measures Bhattacharyya distance and Bhattacharya coefficient. Samarendra Nath Roy is known for his pioneering contributions in multivariate statistics. Among colleagues of Mahalanobis, other notable contributors were K. R. Nair in Design of experiments, Jitendra Mohan Sengupta in Sample Survey, Ajit Dasgupta in Demography and Ramkrishna Mukherjea in Quantitative Sociology. C. R. Rao's contributions laid the foundation of modern statistics during his association with ISI include multiple theorems known as Rao's Quadratic Entropy, Rao's F-Approximation, Rao's Distance, Multivariate Analysis of Variance (MANOVA), Rao's score test, Cramér–Rao inequality and Rao-Blackwell Theorem, and introduction of orthogonal arrays in Design of Experiments. Anil Kumar Gain is known for his contributions to the Pearson product-moment correlation coefficient with his colleague Sir Ronald Fisher at the University of Cambridge.

In 1953, India's first indigenous computer was designed by Samarendra Kumar Mitra who headed the Computing Machines and Electronics Laboratory at ISI Calcutta. The Indian Statistical Institute was also hosted the first two digital computers in South Asia; the HEC-2M from England in 1956, and the URAL from the Soviet Union in 1959. These were also among the earliest digital computers in Asia (outside Japan).

During 1953 – 1956 distinguished scientists, like Ronald Fisher, Norbert Wiener and Yuri Linnik visited ISI. Norbert Wiener collaborated with Gopinath Kallianpur on topics including ergodic theory, prediction theory and generalized harmonic analysis. In 1962, during his month-long visit to ISI, Soviet mathematician Andrey Kolmogorov wrote his notable paper on Kolmogorov complexity, which was published in Sankhya, 1963. Other distinguished scientists including Jerzy Neyman, Walter A. Shewhart, W. Edwards Deming and Abraham Wald have visited ISI during the tenure of P. C. Mahalanobis.

=== Planning Commission ===
The second five-year plan of India was a brainchild of Mahalanobis. The plan followed the Mahalanobis model, an economic development model developed by Mahalanobis in 1953. The plan attempted to determine the optimal allocation of investment between productive sectors in order to maximise long-run economic growth . It used the prevalent state of art techniques of operations research and optimisation as well as the novel applications of statistical models developed at ISI. This second five-year plan shifted the focus from agriculture to industrialisation, with an objective of attaining self-reliance by economy of India. Domestic production of industrial products was encouraged in this plan, particularly in the development of the public sector. The two-pronged strategy devised in this plan targeted rapid growth of the heavy industry, keeping emphasis on growth of small and cottage industries.

B. S. Minhas and K. S. Parikh, both from the Planning Unit of ISI Delhi, played key roles in the Planning Commission of the Government of India. Minhas, who joined the Planning Unit in 1962 and retired as a distinguished scientist in 1989, was a member of the Planning Commission during 1971–74. Parikh, who was a member of the Planning Commission during 2004–09, chaired Integrated Energy Policy Committee of the commission, was a member of the Economic Advisory Council of India during the tenure of five prime ministers, also played a role in the Department of Atomic Energy establishment, and was a key advisor to the government on energy issues.

=== Computer science ===
In India, the first analog computer was designed by Samarendra Kumar Mitra and built by Ashish Kumar Maity at ISI in 1953, for use in computation of numerical solutions of simultaneous linear equations using a modified version of Gauss-Siedel iteration. In 1955, the first digital computer of India was procured by ISI. This was HEC-2M, manufactured by British Tabulating Machine Company (BTM). As per the agreement with BTM, ISI was responsible for its installation and maintenance, before it became operational in 1956.

Though this HEC-2M machine and the URAL-1 machine, which was bought in 1959 from Russia, were operational until 1963, ISI began development of the first second-generation digital computer of India in collaboration with Jadavpur University (JU). This joint collaboration led by the head of the Computing Machines and Electronics Laboratory at ISI, Samarendra Kumar Mitra, produced the transistor-driven machine ISIJU-1, which became operational in 1964. Also in 1964 an IBM 1401 was installed in ISI, Calcutta. The IBM 1401 was a second-generation, transistorized, general-purpose digital computer—essentially a small mainframe for its time.

The first annual convention of the Computer Society of India (CSI) was hosted by ISI in 1965. The Computer and Communication Sciences division of ISI produced many eminent scientists such as Samarendra Kumar Mitra (its original founder), Dwijesh Dutta Majumdar, Sankar Kumar Pal, Bidyut Baran Chaudhuri, Nikhil R. Pal, Bhabani P. Sinha, Bhargab B. Bhattacharya, Malay K. Kundu, Sushmita Mitra, Bhabatosh Chanda, C. A. Murthy, Sanghamitra Bandyopadhyay and many. ISI is regarded as one of the top most centres for research in computer science in India.

The Knowledge-based Computer Systems project (KBCS), funded jointly by Department of Electronics and Information Technology (DoE), Government of India and UNDP since 1986, has a nodal centre at ISI Kolkata. This unit is responsible for research in the area of image processing, pattern recognition, computer vision and artificial intelligence.

=== Social sciences ===
R. L. Brahmachari, known for his work in many fields like agricultural sciences, zoology, botany, biometrics, did much of his work at ISI.

The institute has done some pioneering work and research in anthropology and palaeontology. A trove of dinosaur fossils was discovered by a team led by ISI researchers in the early 1960s. The scattered fossils were recovered and the partial skeleton was reconstructed at ISI's Baranagar campus. It turned out to be a unique species and was named the Barapasaurus tagorei, after Rabindranath Tagore and was mounted in the Geology Museum at the Kolkata Campus of the institute.

The Linguistic Research Unit (LRU) of ISI was involved in the study of speech pathology. Đorđe Kostić of this laboratory was a distinguished scientist. He invented a unique hearing aid, called SAFA (Selective Auditory Frequency Amplifier) that simulates frequency-range according to the need of the particular hearing impaired person.

== Administration ==
ISI functions as an autonomous institute under the Ministry of Statistics and Programme Implementation (MOSPI), which is the nodal ministry of the Government of India that ensures the functioning of ISI in accordance with The Indian Statistical Institute Act 1959. ISI Council is the highest policy–making body of the institute. Members of this council include the president of ISI, the chairman of ISI, representatives of the Government of India including one representative of RBI, scientists not employed in ISI including one representative from the Planning Commission of India and one representative of the UGC, representatives of scientific and non-scientific workers of ISI, and representative from academic staff of ISI, including the director of ISI and the Dean of Studies of ISI. Bimal Kumar Roy was the director until 10 June 2015; in a move unique in the history of the institute, he was removed from his post via a notice posted on the web site of the Ministry of Statistics and Planning. He was sacked over financial and administrative irregularities The list is the following:

President	Term	Chairman	Term	Director	Term
Rajendra Nath Mookerjee	1932-35	B. Rama Rao	1954	P. C. Mahalanobis	1931–1972
E. C. Benthall	1936-37	D. N. Mitra	1955-63	C. R. Rao	1972–1976
James Reid-Kay	1938	K. P. S. Menon	1964-70	Gopinath Kallianpur	1976–1978
Badridas Goenka	1939-41	S. C. Roy	1971	B. P. Adhikari	1979–1983
Nalini Ranjan Sarkar	1942-43	Atma Ram	1972	Ashok Maitra	1984–1987
C. D. Deshmukh	1944-63	P. N. Haksar	1973-97	J. K. Ghosh	1987–1992
Y. B. Chavan	1964-66	Bimal Jalan	1998-2001	B. L. S. Prakasa Rao	1992–1995
Satyendra Nath Bose	1967-74	N. R. Madhava Menon	2002-03	S. B. Rao	1995–2000
Subimal Dutt	1976-89	Pranab Mukherjee	2004-12	K. B. Sinha	2000–2005
M. G. K. Menon	1990-2012	A. K. Antony	2012-May 2014	S. K. Pal	2005–2010
C. Rangarajan	2012	Arun Shourie	2014-2016	Bimal Kumar Roy	2010–2015
Bibek Debroy	2018-till date	Goverdhan Mehta	2018-till date	Sanghamitra Bandyopadhyay	2015 – 2025

== Visits by Heads of states ==
Soviet premier Nikita Khrushchev visited ISI during his visit to India in 1955. Zhou Enlai, the Prime Minister of China, and Ho Chi Minh, the President of Vietnam, during their visit to India specifically visited ISI respectively on 9 September 1956 and 13 February 1958.
