= Social audit =

Evaluation of government performance

The first Social Audit was carried out in Sweden (1985–88) by John Fry and Ulla Ressner, worklife researchers at the Centre for Swedish Working Life (Arbetslivscentrum) and published in Sweden in 1988 by Allmäna Förlaget, Stockholm (332 pp) under the title "Social Revision av ett Ämbetsverk". It was the result of a three-year study of Sweden's central bureaucracy – The National Labour Market Board (Arbetsförmedlingen). The study was based on interviews and questionnaires with over 1,000 employees at all levels of the organisation throughout the country and became the subject of debate in the Swedish Riksdag (Parliament). Its focus was to assess the correspondence between the work experiences of employees and management on the one hand, and the legislated and collectively agreed upon objectives for service, work environmental and managerial policies in its established definition of effectivity in the workplace. In short, it was an assessment of the institutionalisation of a Democratic Rationality. As a result of that critical study and subsequent public media debate regarding the scope of professional academic freedom in Swedish state employ, the two researchers were pressured to resign their tenured research positions and paid by the Swedish state to immigrate to Canada.

The term Social audit was also later used to refer to a form of citizen participation that focuses on government performance and accountability. In that context, a social audit is a way of measuring, understanding, reporting and ultimately improving an organization's social and ethical performance. It is qualitatively different from other forms of audit and citizen participation, whose main purpose is to express citizen's voice and promote a more inclusive government, such as public demonstrations, advocacy and lobbying and/or public hearing initiatives.

The central objective of such a social audit is to monitor, track, analyze, and evaluate government performance, thus making public officials accountable for their actions and decisions. As an evaluation of government performance, a social audit exercise can be considered a mechanism of social oversight: that is, the control that citizens can exert on their government officials to ensure that they act transparently, responsibly and effectively.

Social auditing plays various roles. Social audit processes can help focus on bad government performance and/or behaviour and also by denouncing corrupt public officials or disseminating information about a public officials' asset declaration before an election. A social audit can also significantly contribute to inform the government about the potential impact and consequences of public policies. Moreover, a social audit can also play a critical role in keeping the community informed about government policies and actions and in articulating citizens' demands and needs that might not be otherwise transmitted through more regular channels, such as elections.

Social audit activities can help measure public policy consistency between promises and actual results. Verifying consistency between plans/programs/policies and actual results can lead to improvements in many governance areas, and can translate into economic and social benefits. It can also play a critical role as an anticorruption tool in preventing corrupt practices and/or in providing evidence to expose wrongdoings. Ultimately, social audit paves the way to strengthen trust and confidence in the democratic governance process.

== Background ==
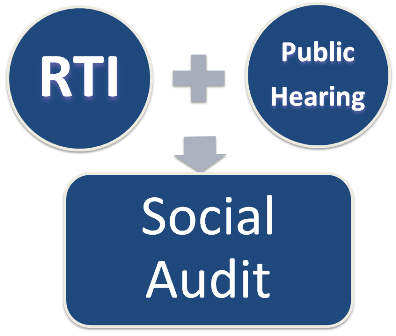
The process of a social audit

It is also a way of measuring, understanding, reporting and ultimately improving an organization's social and ethical performance. It as a term was used as far back as the 1950s. There has been a flurry of activity and interest in India and neighboring countries since the 1990s. It is based on the principle that democratic governance should be carried out, as far as possible, with the consent and understanding of all concerned. It is thus a process and not an event.

Civil society organisations (CSOs), non-governmental organisations (NGOs), political representatives, civil servants and workers of Dungarpur district of Rajasthan and Anantapur district of Andhra Pradesh collectively organise such social audits to prevent mass corruption under the Mahatma Gandhi National Rural Employment Guarantee Act (MGNREGA).

A grass roots organisation of Rajasthan, Mazdoor Kisan Shakti Sangathan (MKSS) is believed to have used the concept of the social audit while fighting corruption in the public works in the early 1990s. As the corruption is attributed to the secrecy in governance, the 'Jansunwai' or public hearing and the right to information (RTI), enacted in 2005, are used to fight this secrecy. Official records obtained using RTI are read out at the public hearing to identify and rectify irregularities. "This process of reviewing official records and determining whether state reported expenditures reflect the actual monies spent on the ground is referred to as a social audit." Participation of informed citizens promotes collective responsibility and awareness about entitlements.

== Dungarpur district of Rajasthan ==
The mass social audit under the employment guarantee scheme in Dungarpur is the most significant feature of the first phase of implementation of the NREGA in India. Launched on 2 February 2006, the first phase of the NREGA implementation included Dungarpur as one of 200 districts of India. A district in the poor tribal belt of southern Rajasthan, Dungarpur is also the birthplace of the Right to Information movement in India. People take a foot march called 'Padayatra' with the aim of spreading awareness across 237 panchayats (rural self-government institutions) of Dungarpur employing 150,000 labourers at 1,700 worksites, about half of rural households belonging to Below Poverty Line (BPL) group in census 2001.

Two factors are believed to be responsible for making the social audit a reality in Rajasthan: first, the presence of activist groups that monitored the public money spent on drought and relief works; and second, the involvement of the working class in demanding employment as an entitlement. Moreover, for the first time in a public programme, the NREGA includes transparency and public scrutiny as the statutory provisions under Section 23 and Section 17 respectively (as outlined in Chapter 11 of the NREGA Operational Guidelines).

These social audits highlight: a significant demand for the NREGA, less than 2 per cent corruption in the form of fudging of muster rolls, building the water harvesting infrastructure as the first priority in the drought-prone district, reduction of out-migration, and above all the women participation of more than 80 per cent in the employment guarantee scheme. The need for effective management of tasks, timely payment of wages and provision of support facilities at work sites is also emphasised.

== Anantapur district of Andhra Pradesh ==
Across all 13 districts of Andhra Pradesh under NREGA, 54 social audits are conducted every month starting from July 2006. The scale and frequency of social audits on NREGA works in Andhra Pradesh are the first in India. Under National Food For Work Programme (NFFWP), before NREGA, AP received more than 3 million tonnes of rice between September 2001 and July 2002, enough to feed twenty million workers for nearly a year, with a market value of Rs 30 billion or $65 million. Due to ineffective mechanisms for limiting corruption, the 2001–2 NFFWP in AP was a failure. It was recommended that the checks and controls must be built into the design of such programmes. Section 17 of the NREGA mandates the regular conduct of social audits on all aspects of the scheme.

Initially, in collaboration with MKSS and ActionAid, the Department of Rural Development (DoRD) of Andhra Pradesh assisted the social audit process through the Strategy and Performance Innovation Unit (SPIU). Since May 2009, the Society for Social Audits Accountability and Transparency (SSAAT), an autonomous body, is responsible for the conduct of social audits in the state. While the director of the SPIU was a civil servant, the director of SSAAT is an activist. In January 2011, Andhra Pradesh introduced a separate vigilance cell in the Rural Development Department to ensure follow up and enforcement of social audit findings.

In Andhra Pradesh, after DoRD and SSAAT, the management structure consists of state resource persons (SRPs), district resource persons (DRPs), and the village social auditors (VSAs). The SRPs identify and train the DRPs who in turn identify and train the VSAs. While the SRPs manage daily activities like scheduling the social audit, contacting district officials, ensuring follow up and enforcement of social audit findings, the DRPs manage the actual conduct of the social audit, for instance, filing RTI applications, and contacting the 'Mandal' level officials to organise logistics and public hearing. To conduct the actual social audit, the volunteers among the NREGA beneficiaries are selected from 'gram sabhas' or village assemblies by DRPs.

An application under the RTI to access relevant official documents is the first step of the social audit. Then the management personnel of the social audit verify these official records by conducting field visits. Finally, the 'Jansunwai' or public hearing is organised at two levels: the Panchayat or village level and the Mandal level. The direct public debate involving the beneficiaries, political representatives, civil servants and, above all, the government officers responsible for implementing the NREGA works highlights corruption like the practice of rigging muster rolls (attendance registers) and also generates public awareness about the scheme.

To assess the effectiveness of the mass social audits on NREGA works in Andhra Pradesh, a World Bank study investigated the effect of the social audit on the level of public awareness about NREGA, its effect on the NREGA implementation, and its efficacy as a grievance redressal mechanism. The study found that the public awareness about the NREGA increased from about 30 per cent before the social audit to about 99 per cent after the social audit. Further, the efficacy of NREGA implementation increased from an average of about 60 per cent to about 97 per cent. Finally, the effectiveness of the social audit as a grievance redressal mechanism was measured to be around 80 per cent.

== See also ==
- MGNREGA
- Economy of India
- Economic development in India
- Poverty in India
