= M. Azizul Islam =

Bangladeshi-British academic

M. Azizul Islam FAcSS
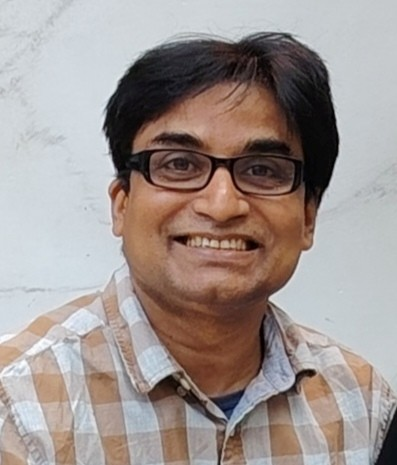
- Born: Muhammad Azizul Islam; Jamalpur, Bangladesh
- Citizenship: Bangladesh, United Kingdom
- Occupation: Academic

Academic background
- Education: University of Dhaka, RMIT University, University of Antwerp
- Website: Information at IDEAS / RePEc

Muhammad Azizul Islam FAcSS is a Bangladeshi-British academic specialising in sustainability accounting, corporate transparency, and corporate social responsibility. He is Chair in Accountancy and Professor of Sustainability Accounting and Transparency at the University of Aberdeen, and director of the University of Aberdeen Business School's Centre for Governance, Accountability, and Sustainability. In 2025, he was elected a Fellow of the Academy of Social Sciences.

== Education ==
Islam earned a PhD in accounting from RMIT University. He also holds degrees from the University of Dhaka and the University of Antwerp.

== Career ==
Islam began his academic career as a lecturer in the Business Administration Discipline at Khulna University in Bangladesh from 1999 to 2001. He subsequently joined the University of Dhaka as a lecturer in the Department of Accounting and Information Systems, later serving as an assistant professor until 2005.

In 2008, he was appointed as a lecturer in accounting at RMIT University in Melbourne, and later that year joined Deakin University as a lecturer. He was promoted to senior lecturer in the School of Accounting, Economics and Finance, serving there until 2013.

From 2013 to 2017, Islam was an associate professor in the School of Accountancy at Queensland University of Technology. In 2017, he was appointed Chair in Accountancy and Professor in Sustainability Accounting and Transparency at the University of Aberdeen. At Aberdeen, he is director of the University of Aberdeen Business School's Centre for Governance, Accountability, and Sustainability.

Islam has been a member of the UK Extractive Industries Transparency Initiative Multi-Stakeholder Group and has contributed to advisory work for the Global Reporting Initiative.

== Research ==
Islam's research focuses on sustainability accounting, corporate accountability, corporate social responsibility, and social and environmental reporting, mainly drawing on stakeholder accountability and social movement theory. His work has examined corporate reporting on social, environmental, and human-rights issues, particularly in relation to global supply chains, global businesses, and developing-country contexts.

A major part of his research concerns business and human rights, labour standards, social audit, and accountability in global garment and retail supply chains. His publications have analysed corporate reporting on International Labour Organization standards, workplace human-rights reporting by garment and retail companies, and the role of non-governmental organisations and the media in influencing corporate accountability practices.

Islam has also published on modern slavery disclosure, social audit, and corporate social transparency. This work includes studies of the Modern Slavery Act 2015, modern slavery audit disclosures, and the role of the accounting profession in addressing modern slavery risks. His research has further addressed anti-corruption and anti-bribery disclosure, climate change disclosure, and broader forms of social and environmental transparency and accountability practices, particularly within global businesses.

Between 2020 and 2023, Islam contributed to funded research projects on labour conditions, purchasing practices, and exploitation risks in the Bangladeshi garment sector. A University of Aberdeen research project that he led examined the effects of global clothing retailers' purchasing practices on Bangladeshi suppliers during the COVID-19 pandemic, and its findings were reported by the BBC. A related project studied the effects of the pandemic on women workers in the Bangladesh garment industry.

== Honours and awards ==
In 2022, Islam received the Outstanding Research Project – COVID-19 Response and Recovery Award at the University of Aberdeen's Principal's Excellence Awards.

In 2022, Islam was named winner of the Fair Trade and Sustainability category at the Scottish Fair Trade Awards.

His co-authored article "Moral versus pragmatic legitimacy and corporate anti-bribery disclosure: evidence from Australia", published in Accounting Forum, was recognised as a 2022 Highly Commended Paper for the journal.

In 2023, Islam received the Research Impact Award at the University of Aberdeen's Principal's Excellence Awards.

In 2023, a University of Aberdeen project led by Islam, titled "The ready-made garment industry: The hidden costs of fast fashion", was shortlisted for Research Project of the Year in the Arts, Humanities and Social Sciences category at the Times Higher Education Awards.

In 2025, he was elected a Fellow of the Academy of Social Sciences.

== Selected bibliography ==
- Islam, M.A., & Deegan, C. (2010). Social Responsibility Disclosure Practices: Evidence from Bangladesh. ACCA.
- Islam, M.A. (2015). Social Compliance Accounting: Managing Legitimacy in Global Supply Chains. Springer.
- Crowther, D., & Islam, M.A. (Eds.). (2015). Sustainability After Rio. Emerald.
- Islam, M.A. (2017). Future of Accounting Profession: Three major changes and implication for Teaching and Research, Global Knowledge Gateway, International Federation of Accountants (IFAC).
- Islam, M.A. (2018). Tackling Modern Slavery: What Role Can Accountants Play?, Global Knowledge Gateway, International Federation of Accountants (IFAC).
- Islam, M.A. (2021). Accountants' Due Diligence for SDG Transparency in the Post-Covid-19 Era, Global Knowledge Gateway, IFAC.
- Islam, M.A., & Van Staden, C. (2022). Modern Slavery Disclosure Regulation and Global Supply Chains: Insights from Stakeholder Narratives on the UK Modern Slavery Act, Journal of Business Ethics, 180, 455–479.
