= Rajat Bansal =

Indian Administrative Service officer

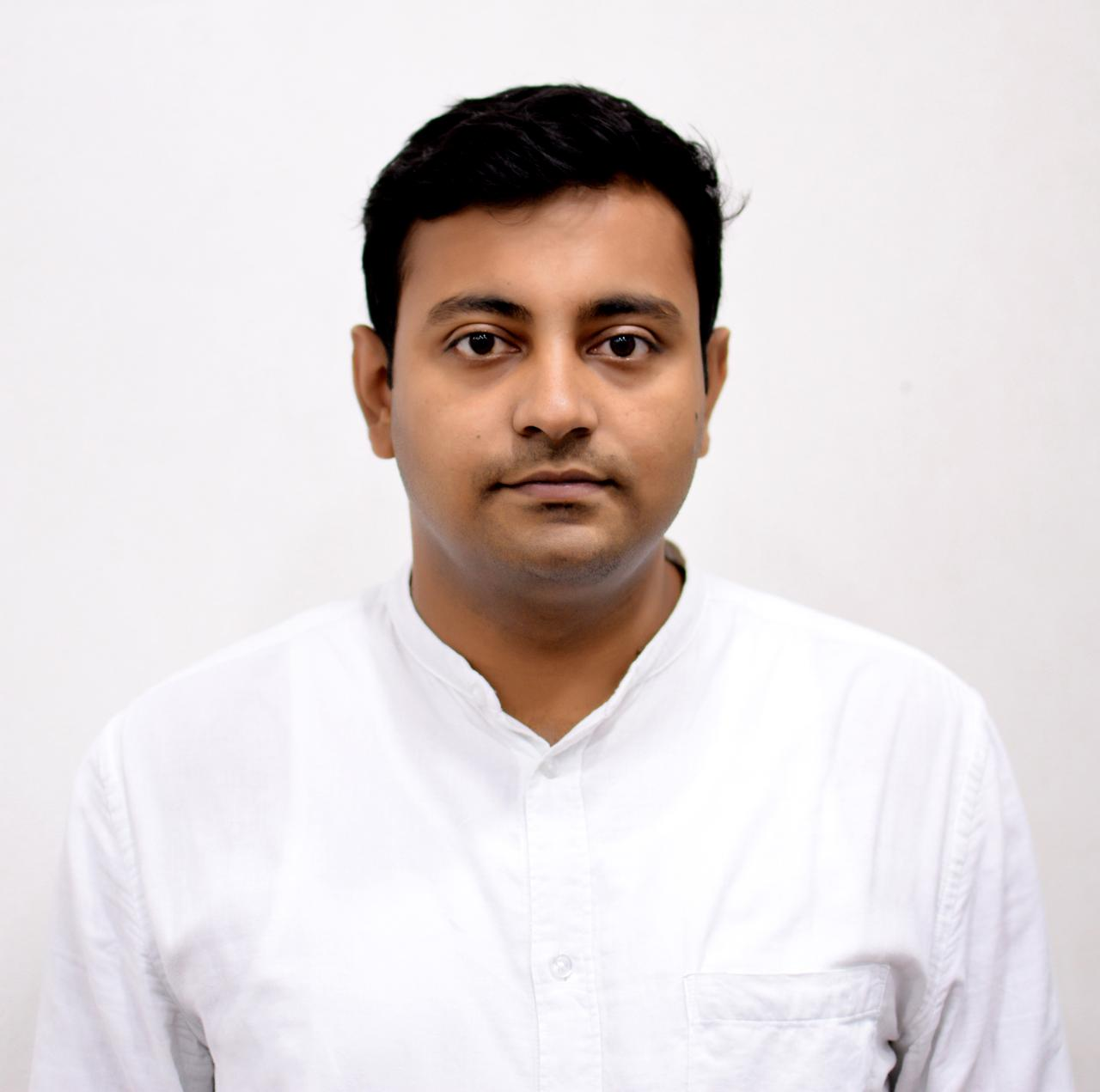

Director, Directorate of Geology and Mining, Chhattisgarh
- Incumbent
- Assumed office 2024

Managing Director and Chief Executive Officer of Raipur Smart City
- In office 2020–2023

Commissioner, MGNREGA, Chhattisgarh
- In office 2023–2024

Additional Secretary, Government of Chhattisgarh
- In office 2024–Incumbent

Personal details
- Born: July 25, 1988 (age 38) Haryana, India
- Education: BITS Pilani
- Occupation: IAS officer

Rajat Bansal is an Indian IAS officer from the Chhattisgarh cadre. He previously served as Managing Director and Chief Executive Officer of Raipur Smart City and as Commissioner of MGNREGA, Chhattisgarh.

== Early life and education ==
Bansal studied engineering and graduated in Computer Science from BITS Pilani before joining the civil services.

He joined the Indian Police Service and trained at the Sardar Vallabhbhai Patel National Police Academy after that he reappeared for the Civil Services Examination and becomes IAS after. Bansal was also posted as Assistant Collector in Raigarh.
