= Grigory Feldman =

Soviet mathematician and economist (1884–1958)

- Born: August 27, 1884; Rostov-on-Don, Yekaterinoslav Governorate, Russian Empire
- Died: 1958 (aged 73–74)
- Education: Bauman Moscow Higher Technical School (BMHTS)
- Scientific career
- Fields: Mathematics, Economics
- Workplaces: Supreme Soviet of the National Economy; State Planning Committee of the Council of Ministers of the USSR Gosplan

Grigory Alexandrovich Feldman (Russian: Григорий Александрович Фельдман; 1884–1958) was a mathematician and economist from the Soviet Union. He qualified as an electrical engineer and joined the State Planning Committee (Gosplan) in 1923 where he worked until 1931. Initially he worked on analysing the German and United States economies as part of the world economy. After completing his analysis of the US economy from 1850 to 1925, he started working on a model for use in planning for the Soviet economy. He presented his report On the Theory of the Rates of Growth of the National Income (en: Parts One and Two) to the Gosplan committee for long-term planning in 1928.

== Feldman–Mahalanobis model ==
The Feldman–Mahalanobis model was partially named after Prasanta Chandra Mahalanobis who developed a similar model to that previously developed by Feldman as the basis for the Second Indian Five Year plan (1956–1961). This was based on an economic development model developed by Mahalanobis in 1953.

Based on Marx's theory, Feldman "divided the entire economy into a capital goods industry and a consumer goods industry, each with its own coefficient, and used as a key variable the proportion of total investment going to the capital goods industry to increase its output".

== Reading ==
- On the Theory of Growth Rates of National Income, I
- On the Theory of Growth Rates of National Income, 2
- The Analytical Method of Constructing Perspective Plans
