= Mahatma Gandhi National Rural Employment Guarantee Act, 2005 =

Social welfare legislation in India

Parliament of India
- Long title: An Act to provide for the enhancement of livelihood security of the households in rural areas of the country by providing at least one hundred days of guaranteed wage employment in every financial year to every household whose adult members volunteer to do unskilled manual work and for matters connected therewith or incidental thereto.
- Citation: 42 (PDF). 2005.
- Territorial extent: India
- Passed by: Lok Sabha
- Passed: 23 August 2005
- Enacted: Same day
- Passed by: Rajya Sabha
- Passed: 25 August 2005
- Assented to: 5 September 2005
- Commenced: 2 February 2006

Legislative history

Initiating chamber: Lok Sabha
- Bill title: The National Rural Employment Guarantee Bill, 2005
- Introduced by: Raghuvansh Prasad Singh, Minister of Rural Development
- Introduced: 22 March 2005

Amended by
- National Rural Employment Guarantee (Amendment) Act, 2009

Repealed by
- Viksit Bharat–Guarantee for Rozgar and Ajeevika Mission (Gramin) Act, 2025

Keywords
- MGNREGA, NREGA
- Status: Repealed

The Mahatma Gandhi National Rural Employment Guarantee Act 2005 (MGNREGA) was an Indian social welfare measure that aimed to guarantee the 'right to work'. This act was passed on 23 August 2005 and was implemented in February 2006 under the UPA government of Prime Minister Manmohan Singh following the tabling of the bill in parliament by the Minister for Rural Development Raghuvansh Prasad Singh. The bill was originally known as the National Rural Employment Guarantee Act (NREGA). In 2025, it was repealed by the Parliament of India after the Lok Sabha and Rajya Sabha passed the Viksit Bharat–Guarantee for Rozgar and Ajeevika Mission (Gramin) Act, 2025 (VB–G RAM G). The new legislation replaced MGNREGA with an updated rural employment and livelihood guarantee framework under the Ministry of Rural Development.

It aimed to enhance livelihood security in rural areas by providing at least 100 days of assured and guaranteed wage employment in a financial year to at least one member of every Indian rural household whose adult members volunteer to do unskilled manual work. Women are guaranteed one half of the jobs made available under the MGNREGA and efforts are made to ensure that cross the limit of 50%. Another aim of MGNREGA is to create durable assets (such as roads, canals, ponds and wells). Employment is to be provided within 5 km of an applicant's residence, and minimum legal wage under the law is to be paid. If work is not provided within 15 days of applying, applicants are entitled to an unemployment allowance. That is, if the government fails to provide employment, it has to provide certain unemployment allowances to those people. Thus, employment under MGNREGA is a legal entitlement. Apart from providing economic security and creating rural assets, other things said to promote NREGA are that it can help in protecting the environment, empowering rural women, reducing rural-urban migration and fostering social equity, among others."

The act was first proposed in 1991 by then Prime Minister P.V. Narasimha Rao. It was finally accepted in the parliament and commenced implementation in 625 districts of India. Based on this pilot experience, NREGA was scoped up to cover all the districts of India from 1 April 2008. The statute was praised by the government as "the largest and most ambitious social security and public works program in the world". In 2009 the World Bank had chided the act along with others for hurting development through policy restrictions on internal movement. However in its World Development Report 2014, the World Bank called it a "stellar example of rural development". MGNREGA is to be implemented mainly by gram panchayats (GPs). The law states it provides many safeguards to promote its effective management and implementation. The act explicitly mentions the principles and agencies for implementation, list of allowed works, financing pattern, monitoring and evaluation, and detailed measures to ensure transparency and accountability.

== History ==
Since 1960, 30 years were expended in struggling to find suitable employment schemes in India's vast rural hinterland. The experiences of these decades provided important lessons to the government. These included the 'Rural Manpower Programme' which exposed the tribulations of financial management, the 'Crash Scheme for Rural Employment' on planning for outcomes, a 'Pilot Intensive Rural Employment Programme' of labour-intensive works, the 'Drought Prone Area Programme' of integrated rural development, 'Marginal Farmers and Agricultural Labourers Scheme' of rural economic development, the ‘Food for Work Programme’ (FWP) of holistic development and better coordination with the states, the ‘National Rural Employment Programme’ (NREP) of community development, and the ‘Rural Landless Employment Guarantee Programme’ (RLEGP) of focus on landless households. The Planning Commission later approved the scheme and it was adopted on national scale.

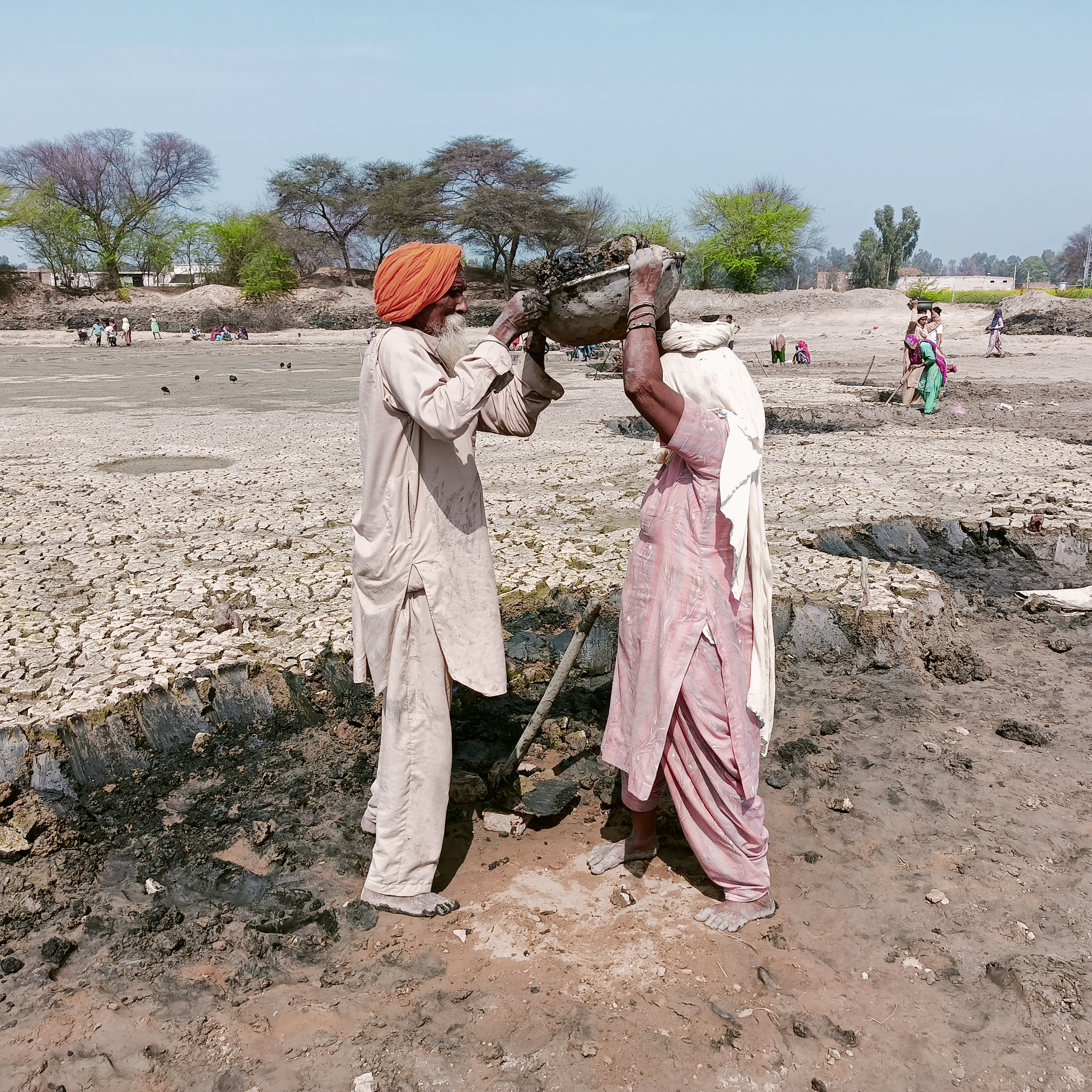
MGNREGA workers removing mud from a dry pond

In April 1989, to converge employment generation, infrastructure development and food security in rural areas, the government integrated NREP and RLEGP (Note: The Rural Landless Employment Guarantee Programme (RLEGP) of August 1983 to focus specially on landless households.) into a new scheme Jawahar Rozgar Yojana (JRY). The most significant change was the decentralization of implementation by involving the local people through local village governments or Panchayati Raj Institutions (PRIs) and hence a decreasing role of bureaucracy. In October 1993, the Employment Assurance Scheme (EAS) was initiated to provide employment to agricultural hands during the lean agricultural season. The role of PRIs was reinforced with the local self-government at the district level called the 'Zilla Parishad' as the main implementing authority. Later, the EAS was merged with Sampoorna Gramin Rojgar Yojana (SGRY) in 2001.

On 1 April 1999, the JRY was revamped and renamed to Jawahar Gram Samridhi Yojana (JGSY) with a similar objective. The role of PRIs was further reinforced with the local self-government at the village level called the ‘Village Panchayats’ as the sole implementing authority. In 2001, it was merged with SGRY. On 25 September 2001 to converge employment generation, infrastructure development and food security in rural areas, the government integrated EAS and JGSY into a new scheme SGRY. The role of PRIs was retained with the 'Village Panchayats' as the sole implementing authority. Due to implementation issues, it was merged with NREGA in 2006. In January 2001, the government introduced a FWP similar to the one that was initiated in 1977. Once NREGA was enacted, the two were merged in 2006. The total government allocation to these precursors of NREGA had been about three-quarters of ₹1 trillion (US$10 billion). Employment generation programmes created after 2005 include the Prime Minister Employment Generation Programme (PMEGP).

The colonial era, when India was governed by the British, is when the problems of poverty and a lack of employment possibilities in rural areas first surfaced. The lopsided economic development pattern was caused by the colonial government's emphasis on growing the urban economy at the expense of the rural economy, which remained even after India attained independence. Additionally, the colonial authority established land revenue procedures that led to a concentration of land ownership in the hands of a select few, which in turn marginalized the rural poor. Additionally, the British promoted the growth of cash crops above food crops, which reduced agricultural productivity and brought about famine in some regions of the nation. Despite independence, the legacy of colonialism remains.

Particularly, colonialism had a lasting effect on the economic and social advancement of India, with rural areas and people being the most negatively impacted. The colonial era is still evident in the underfunding of rural infrastructure, the lack of systemic social assistance programs, and the scarcity of job prospects. To address these difficulties, a determined effort must be made to reverse the historical neglect of rural areas and give them development priority.

In response to the cries for help, the Indian government put together a nationwide welfare scheme aimed at targeting this very issue: The Mahatma Gandhi National Rural Employment Guarantee Act, or MGNREGA. The Government of India introduced the MGNREGA social welfare program in 2005 to address the problem of unemployment and poverty in rural areas. Recognizing the high rates of unemployment and poverty in rural India, especially among the underprivileged groups of the population, led to the need for such a program.

The MGNREGA was created with the idea of giving rural households a safety net in the form of guaranteed work possibilities. Every rural household in the nation was to receive 100 days of guaranteed employment each year as part of the program, guaranteeing that each household had access to a minimum amount of income. The program was intended to be labor-intensive, with the main sources of employment being initiatives like road building, water conservation, and afforestation. The Ministry of Rural Development, a section of the Government of India’s economic bureau, was in charge of overseeing the implementation and rollout of the plan. Gram Panchayats - governing heads in rural villages, were the envoy for implementing the scheme at the local level.

== Provisions ==
The registration process involves an application to the Gram Panchayat and issuance of job cards. The wage employment must be provided within 15 days of the date of application. The work entitlement of 100 days (Note: This number has been increased on paper. In practice the number varies to less than half the stipulated days.) per household per year may be shared between different adult members of the same household. The law lists permissible works: water conservation and water harvesting; drought proofing including afforestation; irrigation works; restoration of traditional water bodies; land development; flood control; rural connectivity; and works notified by the government. The Act sets a minimum limit to the wage-material ratio as 60:40. The provision of accredited engineers, worksite facilities and a weekly report on worksites is also mandated by the Act. The Act sets a minimum limit to the wages, to be paid with gender equality, either on a time-rate basis or on a piece-rate basis. The states are required to evolve a set of norms for the measurement of works and schedule of rates. Unemployment allowance must be paid if the work is not provided within the statutory limit of 15 days. The law stipulates Gram Panchayats to have a single bank account for NREGA works which shall be subjected to public scrutiny. To promote transparency and accountability, the act mandates 'monthly squaring of accounts'. To ensure public accountability through public vigilance, the NREGA designates ‘social audits’ as key to its implementation.

The most detailed part of the Act (chapter 10 and 11) deals with transparency and accountability that lays out role of the state, the public vigilance and, above all, the social audits. For evaluation of outcomes, the law also requires management of data and maintenance of records, like registers related to employment, job cards, assets, muster rolls and complaints, by the implementing agencies at the village, block and state level. The legislation specifies the role of the state in ensuring transparency and accountability through upholding the right to information and disclosing information proactively, preparation of annual reports by the Central Employment Guarantee Council for the Parliament and State Employment Guarantee Councils for state legislatures, undertaking mandatory financial audits by each district along with physical audit, taking action on audit reports, developing a Citizen's Charter, establishing vigilance and monitoring committees, and developing a grievance redressal system.

The Act recommends establishment of 'Technical Resource Support Groups' at district, state and central level and active use of information technology, like creation of a 'Monitoring and Information System (MIS)' and a NREGA website, to assure quality in implementation of NREGA through technical support. The law allows convergence of NREGA with other programmes. As NREGA intends to create ‘additional’ employment, the convergence should not affect employment provided by other programmes.

== The law and the Constitution of India ==
The Act aimed to follow the Directive Principles of State Policy enunciated in Part IV of the Constitution of India. The law by providing a 'right to work' is consistent with Article 41 that directs the State to secure to all citizens the right to work. The statute also seeks to protect the environment through rural works which is consistent with Article 48A that directs the State to protect the environment.

In accordance with the Article 21 of the Constitution of India that guarantees the right to life with dignity to every citizen of India, this act imparts dignity to the rural people through an assurance of livelihood security. The Fundamental Right enshrined in Article 16 of the Constitution of India guarantees equality of opportunity in matters of public employment and prevents the State from discriminating against anyone in matters of employment on the grounds only of religion, race, caste, sex, descent, place of birth, place of residence or any of them. NREGA also follows Article 46 that requires the State to promote the interests of and work for the economic uplift of the scheduled castes and scheduled tribes and protect them from discrimination and exploitation.

Article 40 mandates the State to organise village panchayats and endow them with such powers and authority as may be necessary to enable them to function as units of self-government. Conferring the primary responsibility of implementation on Gram Panchayats, the Act adheres to this constitutional principle. Also the process of decentralization initiated by 73rd Amendment to the Constitution of India that granted a constitutional status to the Panchayats is further reinforced by the Mahatma Gandhi NREGA that endowed these rural self-government institutions with authority to implement the law. Additionally, the Act also empowers women by mandating at least one-third participation of women in the implementation of works under NREGA.

== The law in action ==
=== Independent academic research ===
Academic research has focused on many dimensions of the NREGA: economic security, self-targeting, women's empowerment, asset creation, corruption, how the scheme impacts agricultural wages.

An early overall assessment in 2008 in six north Indian states suggested that NREGA was "making a difference to the lives of the rural poor, slowly but surely." The composition of NREGA workers included the poorest and socially and economically deprived. A majority of them belong to Scheduled Castes and Scheduled Tribes, are illiterate and do not have electricity at home. Self-targeting evidence suggests that there is a lot of unmet demand for work.

Agricultural wages have increased, especially for women, since the inception of the scheme. This indicates that overall wage levels have increased due to the act, however, further research highlights that the key benefit of the scheme lies in the reduction of wage volatility. This highlights that NREGA may be an effective insurance scheme. A particular focus has been to understand whether the scheme has reduced migration into urban centres for casual work.

Studies have suggested that women's participation has remained high, though there are inter-state variations. One study in border villages of Rajasthan, Madhya Pradesh and Gujarat studied the effect on short term migration and child welfare and found that among children who do not migrate, grade completed is higher. The study found that demand for NREGA work is higher, even though migrant wages are higher.

A few studies focusing on the potential for asset creation under NREGA suggest that (a) the potential is substantial; (b) in some places, it is being realized, and (c) lack of staff, especially technical staff, rather than lack of material are to blame for poor realization of this potential. Others have pointed out that water harvesting and soil conservation works promoted through NREGA "could have high positive results on environment security and biodiversity and environment conservation". A study conducted by researchers at the Indian Institute of Science and other collaborators found that activities related to natural resource management under the MGNREGA can capture 249 metric tons of carbon dioxide equivalent by 2030. India has placed emphasis on MGNREGA as a contributor to carbon sequestration in its Third Biennial Update Report submitted to the United Nations Framework Convention on Climate Change in 2021.

Improvements in reducing corruption are attributable to the move to pay NREGA wages through bank and post office accounts. Some of the success in battling corruption can also be attributed to the strong provisions for community monitoring. Others find that "the overall social audit effects on reducing easy-to-detect malpractices was mostly absent".

A few papers also study the link between electoral gains and implementation of NREGA. One studies the effect in Andhra Pradesh - the authors find that "while politics may influence programme expenditure in some places and to a small extent, this is not universally true and does not undermine the effective targeting and good work of the scheme at large." The two other studies focus on these links in Rajasthan and West Bengal. Several local case studies are also being conducted to identify the regional impacts of NREGA.

=== Assessment by the constitutional auditor ===
The second performance audit by the Comptroller and Auditor General (CAG) of India covered 3,848 gram panchayats (GPs) in 28 states and 4 union territories (UTs) from April 2007 to March 2012. This comprehensive survey by the CAG documents lapses in implementation of the act.

The main problems identified in the audit included: a fall in the level of employment, low rates of completion of works (only 30.3 per cent of planned works had been completed), poor planning (in one-third of Gram Panchayats, the planning process mandated by the act had not been followed), lack of public awareness partly due to poor information, education and communication IEC) by the state governments, shortage of staff (e.g., Gram Rozgar Sewaks had not been appointed in some states) and so on. Not withstanding the statutory requirement of notification, yet five states had not even notified the eight-years-old scheme.

The comprehensive assessment of the performance of the law by the constitutional auditor revealed serious lapses arising mainly due to lack of public awareness, mismanagement and institutional incapacity. The CAG also suggested some corrective measures.

Even though the mass social audits have a statutory mandate of Section 17 (As outlined in Chapter 11 of the NREGA Operational Guidelines), only seven states have the institutional capacity to facilitate the social audits as per prescribed norms. Although the Central Council is mandated to establish a central evaluation and monitoring system as per the NREGA Operational Guidelines, even after six years it is yet to fulfill the NREGA directive. Further, the CAG audit reports discrepancies in the maintenance of prescribed basic records in up to half of the gram panchayats (GPs) which inhibits the critical evaluation of the NREGA outcomes. The unreliability of Management Information System (MIS), due to significant disparity between the data in the MIS and the actual official documents, is also reported.

To improve management of outcomes, it recommended proper maintenance of records at the gram panchayat (GP) level. Further the Central Council is recommended to establish a central evaluation and monitoring system for "a national level, comprehensive and independent evaluation of the scheme". The CAG also recommends a timely payment of unemployment allowance to the rural poor and a wage material ratio of 60:40 in the NREGA works. Moreover, for effective financial management, the CAG recommends proper maintenance of accounts, in a uniform format, on a monthly basis and also enforcing the statutory guidelines to ensure transparency in the disposal of funds. For capacity building, the CAG recommends an increase in staff hiring to fill the large number of vacancies.

For the first time, the CAG also included a survey of more than 38,000 NREGA beneficiaries. An earlier evaluation of the NREGA by the CAG was criticized for its methodology.

=== Evaluation by the government ===
The Prime Minister of India Manmohan Singh released an anthology of research studies on the MGNREGA called "MGNREGA Sameeksha" in New Delhi on 14 July 2012, about a year before the CAG report. Aruna Roy and Nikhil Dey said that "the MGNREGA Sameeksha is a significant innovation to evaluate policy and delivery". The anthology draws on independent assessments of MGNREGA conducted by Indian Institutes of Management (IIMs), Indian Institutes of Technology (IITs) and others in collaboration with United Nations Development Programme (UNDP) published from 2008 to 2012.

The Prime Minister said, "The Mahatma Gandhi NREGA story in numbers is a story worth telling... (but) statistics do not tell the whole truth": Minister of Rural Development Jairam Ramesh says in the 'MGNREGA Sameeksha':

MGNREGA’s other quantitative achievements:

- Since its inception in 2006, around ₹1,10,000 crore (about US$25 billion) has gone directly as wage payment to rural households and 1200 crore (12 billion) person-days of employment has been generated. On an average, 5 crore (50 million) households have been provided employment every year since 2008.
- Eighty per cent of households are being paid directly through bank/post office accounts, and 10 crore (100 million) new bank/post office accounts have been opened.
- The average wage per person-day has gone up by 81 per cent since the Scheme’s inception, with state-level variations. The notified wage today varies from a minimum of ₹122 (US$1.76) in Bihar, Jharkhand to ₹191 (US$2.76) in Haryana.
- Scheduled Castes (SCs) and Scheduled Tribes (STs) have accounted for 51 per cent of the total person-days generated and women for 47 per cent, well above the mandatory 33 per cent as required by the Act.
- 146 lakh (14.6 million) works have been taken up since the beginning of the programme, of which about 60 per cent have been completed.
- 12 crore (120 million) Job Cards (JCs) have been given and these along with the 9 crore (90 million) muster rolls have been uploaded on the Management Information System (MIS), available for public scrutiny. Since 2010–11, all details with regard to the expenditure of the MGNREGA are available on the MIS in the public domain.

Proponents of the scheme enumerate number of benefits. For example, Rejaul Karim Laskar, an ideologue of the Congress party- the largest constituent of the UPA Government which introduced the scheme, claimed that the scheme has multifarious benefits including "reduction in poverty, reduction in migration, women empowerment, improvement of productivity of agricultural land and regeneration of water resources".

=== Social audit ===
Civil society organisations (CSOs), nongovernmental organisations (NGOs), political representatives, civil servants and workers of Rajasthan and Andhra Pradesh collectively organise social audits to prevent corruption under the NREGA. As the corruption is attributed to the secrecy in governance, the 'Janasunani' or public hearing and the right to information (RTI), enacted in 2005, are used to fight this secrecy. Official records obtained using RTI are read out at the public hearing to identify and rectify irregularities. "This process of reviewing official records and determining whether state reported expenditures reflect the actual monies spent on the ground is referred to as a social audit." Participation of informed citizens promotes collective responsibility and awareness about entitlements.

A continuous process of social audit on NREGA works involves public vigilance and verification at the stipulated 11 stages of implementation: registration of families; distribution of job cards; receipt of work applications; selection of suitable public works; preparation of technical estimates; work allocation; implementation and supervision; payment of wages; payment of unemployment allowance; evaluation of outcomes; and mandatory social audit in the Gram Sabha or Social Audit Forum. The Gram Panchayat Secretary is designated as the authority responsible for carrying out the social audit at all stages. For some stages, the programme officer and the junior engineer is also responsible along with Sarpanch.

The statute designates the Gram Sabha meetings held to conduct social audit as the 'Social Audit Forums' and spells out three steps to make them effective: publicity and preparation of documents; organizational and procedural aspects; and the mandatory agenda involving questions verifying compliance with norms specified at each of the 11 stages of implementation.

An application under the RTI to access relevant official documents is the first step of the social audit. Then the management personnel of the social audit verify these official records by conducting field visits. Finally, the 'Janasunani' or public hearing is organised at two levels: the Panchayat or village level and the Mandal level. The direct public debate involving the beneficiaries, political representatives, civil servants and, above all, the government officers responsible for implementing the NREGA works highlights corruption like the practice of rigging muster rolls (attendance registers) and also generates public awareness about the scheme.

These social audits on NREGA works in Rajasthan highlight: a significant demand for the scheme, less than 2 per cent corruption in the form of fudging of muster rolls, building the water harvesting infrastructure as the first priority in the drought-prone district, reduction of out-migration, and above all the women participation of more than 80 per cent in the employment guarantee scheme. The need for effective management of tasks, timely payment of wages and provision of support facilities at work sites is also emphasised.

To assess the effectiveness of the mass social audits on NREGA works in Andhra Pradesh, a World Bank study investigated the effect of the social audit on the level of public awareness about NREGA, its effect on the NREGA implementation, and its efficacy as a grievance redressal mechanism. The study found that the public awareness about the NREGA increased from about 30 per cent before the social audit to about 99 per cent after the social audit. Further, the efficacy of NREGA implementation increased from an average of about 60 per cent to about 97 per cent. In 2014 a large number of localities did not conduct NREGA social audits. Social audits have been found lacking in terms of quality and retrievability.

=== Wages ===
| State | Per day wages (In Rs.) | | | State | Per day wages (In Rs.) | | |
| State | 2022 | 2018 | 2012 | State | 2022 | 2018 | 2012 |
|---|---|---|---|---|---|---|---|
| Andhra Pradesh | 257 | 205 | 137 | Manipur | 251 | 209 | 144 |
| Arunachal Pradesh | 216 | 177 | 124 | Meghalaya | 230 | 181 | 128 |
| Assam | 229 | 189 | 136 | Mizoram | 233 | 194 | 136 |
| Bihar | 210 | 168 | 122 | Nagaland | 216 | 177 | 124 |
| Chhattisgarh | 204 | 174 | 132 | Odisha | 222 | 182 | 126 |
| Goa | 315 | 254 | 158 | Punjab | 281 | 240 | 166 |
| Gujarat | 239 | 194 | 134 | Rajasthan | 231 | 192 | 133 |
| Haryana | 331 | 281 | 191 | Sikkim | 222 | 177 | 124 |
| Himachal Pradesh | 266 | 184 | 157 | Tamil Nadu | 281 | 224 | 132 |
| Jharkhand | 210 | 168 | 122 | Telangana | 257 | 205 | — |
| Karnataka | 309 | 249 | 155 | Tripura | 212 | 177 | 124 |
| Kerala | 311 | 271 | 164 | Uttar Pradesh | 213 | 175 | 125 |
| Madhya Pradesh | 204 | 174 | 132 | Uttarakhand | 213 | 175 | 125 |
| Maharashtra | 256 | 203 | 145 | West Bengal | 223 | 191 | 136 |
One day is considered as 9 hours of work with one hour of rest. Difference between states due to difference in state-wise inflation rates. 2022: Highest- ₹331 (US$3.40) Lowest- ₹204 (US$2.10) per day wages

Wage transfer processes in relation to NREGA have undergone significant changes since its initial implementation. In 2011/2016, the wage payment method was shifted to the National electronic Fund Management System (Ne-FMS), a Direct Benefit Transfer system. The Consumer Price Index-Agriculture Labour (CPI-AL) now provides a guide to fixing MGNREGA wages. The scheme has resulted in an increase in the growth rate of wages when the initial pre and post NREGA years are considered.

As of 2019, the wages are less than the minimum wages in a majority of states and union territories. Since 2009 wages stipulated under MGNREGA are disconnected from wages determined by the Minimum Wages Act. There has been some debate with regard to comparison between the two wages. One day is considered as 9 hours of work with one hour of rest. Payment is on a piece work basis.

In addition to expanding the transparency of the scheme via digitization, Strong increases in the minimum wage improved the plan. As was previously mentioned in section II, the previous salaries had resulted in a lack of desire among employees and harmed the caliber of work completed under the program. As a result, the minimum wage was raised by 10% to Rs. 169 per day as part of the 2014 programs. Even though the rise was not significant, it greatly increased the motivation of low-income rural workers, encouraging them to enter the labor field.

Wage payments face delays, in some cases up to 200 days. Center-state disunity, compliance, and "infrastructural bottlenecks" are some of the causes of delay. By 2021, 99.7% of payments under the Act were through electronic transfer. These are also affected by "last mile" issues. Ideal financial inclusion in still lacking. While the scheme stipulates 100 days, in practice the average is around 45 days.

=== Asset creation ===
Assets created include rural connectivity assets such as pucca roads and brick soling, land development assets which improve productivity of land such as the creation of new plantations, unskilled construction such as poultry shelters, cattle shelters and fish drying yard platform. Water-related assets include village tanks and ponds, check dams, water harvesting tanks, bunding, irrigation channels, renovation of existing water assets. Infrastructure construction also includes sanitation works and grain storage facilities. The act also provides for maintenance of created assets. Asset creation varies widely between states with five states accounting for a majority of the assets. The focus of MNREGA has also shifted to quality of assets and skilling workers to map assets.

Over the last decade, it has been observed that more than half the NREGA funds have been spent on water related projects. This was very much needed because water bodies have been shrinking, especially in rural India. India became a water deficient nation 5 years ago, and every year since then, the water level has shrunk further. Though over Rs 20,000 crores under MGNREGA has been spent each year during the last decade on developing rural water bodies, wells, aquifers, catchment areas, etc, these were not permanent assets.

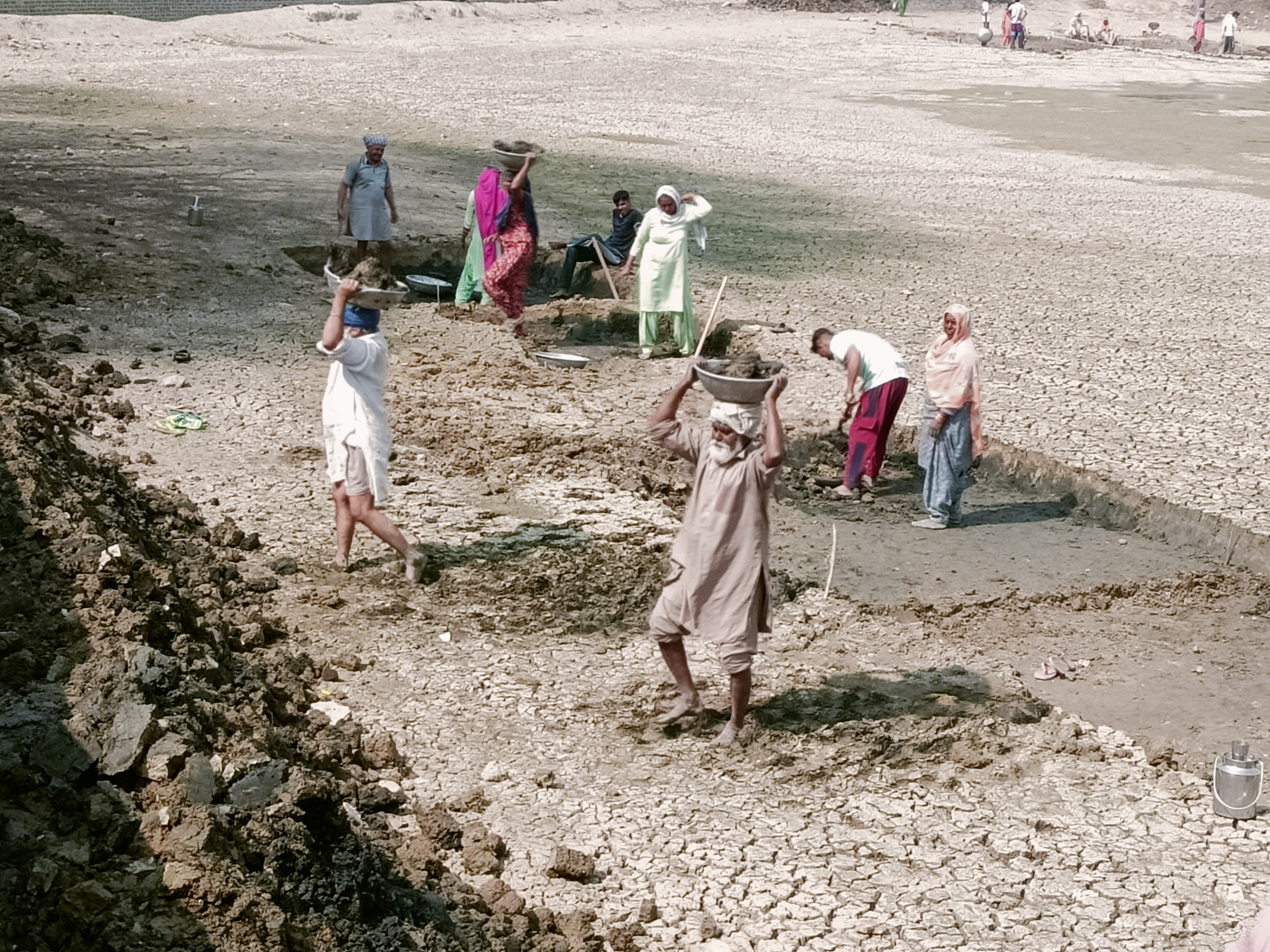
MGNREGA Workers removing mud from a dry pond at village Asir, District Sirsa of Haryana, India

=== Convergence ===
There has been increasing rationale for convergence of MNREGA with other government schemes. Assets created under the act have been converged with aligning assets from other schemes such as housing and sanitation schemes. Member of Parliament Local Area Development Scheme was converged in 2012. Trekking trails have been planned in Himachal Pradesh. Convergence calls for greater inter-department cooperation. While convergence has been seen as a way to save resources, at the same time it weakens income means for those availing the scheme.

=== Composition of youth workforce ===
In 2013-14, the ratio of young workers among total MGNREGA workers was 13.64 per cent which came down to 7.73 percent in 2017-18 before rising to 9.1 percent in 2018-19 and 10.06 percent in 2019-20.The trend shows that a steady decline in the proportion of young workers, those between 18 and 30, under the Act has halted and has begun to rise in the wake of demonetisation and the rollout of GST. This has been projected by a section of analysts as a reflection of rural distress intensifying.

== Subsequent developments ==
By 2015, over a thousand advisories and circulars related to the act had been issued.

=== New amendments proposed in 2014 ===
Union Rural Development Minister Nitin Gadkari proposed to limit MGNREGA programmes within tribal and poor areas. He also proposed to change the labour: material ratio from 60:40 to 51:49. As per the new proposal, the programme will be implemented in 2,500 backward blocks. Both proposals came in for sharp criticism. A number of economists with diverse views opposed the idea of restricting or "focusing" implementation in a few districts or blocks.

In the November 2014 cabinet expansion, Birender Singh replaced Nitin Gadkari as rural development minister. Among the first statements made by the new minister was an assurance that NREGA would continue in all districts. Around the same time, however, NREGA budget saw a sharp cut, and in the name of 'focusing' on a few blocks the programme has been limited to those blocks.

The Government of India (GoI) has created a new Ministry of Jal Shakti to allow faster decision making on all subjects related to water. On 1 July 2019 the GoI has launched the Jal Shakti Abhiyan (JSA) across 256 districts covering 1593 water stress blocks with a focus on water conservation and rain water harvesting. The effort will be to make water conservation a “mass movement” like Swachhata Abhiyan in the country. MGNREGA is a key partner in the JSA.

=== Save MGNREGA ===
In September 2014 'Save MGNREGA' is a set of demands proposed during the joint meeting of the national leadership of Centre of Indian Trade Unions (CITU), All India Agricultural Workers Union (AIAWU), All India Democratic Women's Association (AIDWA) and All India Kisan Sabha (AIKS) in New Delhi. The agenda was to discuss the dilution of MGNREGA scheme by the new government. Following demands were proposed:

1. Government of India should increase the Central allocation for the scheme so that number of workdays can be increased to 200 and per day wage can be increased to Rs. 300.
2. Job card to be issued for everyone who demands job, failing which, after 15 days employment benefits should be given.
3. Minimum 150 days of work should be ensured to all card holders
4. Minimum wage act should be strictly implemented. Delay in wage payment should be resolved.
5. MGNREGA should be extended to urban areas.
6. Gram Sabhas should be strengthened to monitor proper implementation of the scheme and also to check corruption.

=== New amendments proposed in 2017 ===
Finance Minister Arun Jaitley announced Rs. 48,000 crore to be allocated to the MGNREGA as a part of 2017 Union budget of India.

== Criticism ==
My political instincts tell me that MNREGA should not be discontinued... This is a living monument of your failure to tackle poverty in 60 years. After so many years in power, all you were able to deliver is for a poor man to dig ditches a few days a month.

— Prime Minister Narendra Modi, February 2015. Environment Sciences says the true story, i.e. revival of the Water Table (ref Ministry of Rural Development).

A major criticism of the MGNREGA is that a lot of money disbursed by the government gets siphoned off by middlemen, thus leaving a number of MGNREGA workers either with unpaid wages or less than standard wages. In Mahuadand, Jharkhand, most of the people who had worked under the MGNREGA did not get paid, while some either got paid less than stipulated or were given 5 kg of rice by private contractors instead. Following allegations of corruption in the scheme, the NDA government ordered a re-evaluation of MNREGA in 2015. Between 2017 and 2021 about 1000 crore of funds were stolen in the form of bribes, ghost accounts and fake material rates (loss rate is 0.4% p.a.). However there are proponents that claim NREGA is relatively successful in reducing corruption.

Another criticism of NREGA is that it is making agriculture less profitable. Landholders often oppose it on these grounds. The big farmer's point of view can be summed up as follows: landless labourers are lazy and they don't want to work on farms as they can get money without doing anything at NREGA worksites; farmers may have to sell their land, thereby laying foundation for the corporate farming.. Farm workers earn twice as much per day (breakfast, lunch and samosa & tea included), as the workers on NREGA workssites.

Economists like Jagdish Bhagwati and Arvind Panagariya have described NREGA as "an inefficient instrument of shifting income to the poor" – the general notion being that it takes five rupees to transfer one rupee to NREGA workers. This may be an exaggeration of consultancies, reviews and analysis, and needs to be verified by the National Institute of Rural Development (Hyderabad), and compared with green renovation of the parks in urban India. Economists including Surjit Bhalla have termed it as unsuccessful suggesting that schemes such as the NREGA need to be junked, saying that any scheme with 85 percent leakages can't be proclaimed to be "working successfully".

Issues related to delayed/inadequate wage payments persist in the programme’s implementation.

In the Economic Survey of 2025-2026, the government argued that there has been around 53% decline in the demand for MGNREGA jobs between 2020 and 2025, implying that the scheme has been becoming irrelevant. But this could be due to base effect as 2020 saw covid crisis and a subsequent high subscription for MGNREGA jobs following the lockdown in other sectors. Following this the new scheme VB-G RAM G has replaced MGNREGA in December 2025.

== See also ==
- Economic development in India
- Poverty in India
- Midday Meal Scheme
- Public Distribution System
- National Food Security Act, 2013
- Attacks on RTI activists in India
- Job guarantee
- Swarna Jayanti Shahari Rozgar Yojana
