= Pakistan Statistical Society =

Academic and professional society of statisticians

Pakistan Statistical Association Pakistan Statistical Society
- Abbreviation: PSA
- Predecessor: None
- Formation: 1947-1976; July 5, 1995; 31 years ago
- Type: Scientific think tank
- Headquarters: Institute of Statistics, PU
- Location: Peshawar, KPK Province
- Region served: South Asia
- Official language: English; Urdu
- President: Dr. Ch. Asghar Ali
- Affiliations: International Statistical Institute

The Pakistan Statistical Society Acronym:PSA; also known as Pakistan Statistical Society (PSS), is an academic and professional society of statisticians from Pakistan and abroad, dedicated and devoted to the field of Mathematical statistics. It is one of the leading mathematical and learned societies in Pakistan, being the only and oldest society of its nature.

The history of Pakistan Statistical Society traces back to 1947, when Pakistan was created, and was encouraged by the prominent and influential Indian statistician Dr. Prasanta Chandra Mahalanobis. The foundation of the society in 1947 was encouraged and spearheaded by Prasanta Chandra Mahalanobis and Dr. Raziuddin Siddiqui, a mathematical physicist. Dr. Siddiqui served its first president whilst Mahalanobis became its life member. Both Siddiqui and Mahalanobis remained influential members, however after the death of Mahalanobis, Siddiqui's interest dwindled and the society struggled to gain its former prominence and importance. In 1976, the society was disintegrated and had gone inactive and defunct prior.

The association was revived in 1995, after about twenty years, through productive and effective efforts led by the country's notable statisticians and with the help of Federal Bureau of Statistics. The statisticians at Peshawar University delegated and called statisticians from all over the country and abroad to participate in an international seminar on the recent developments in Statistics organized by Department of Statistics. The prominent and renowned applied statistician Dr. Ch. Asghar Ali has been its president since 1995, and is currently headquartered at the Department of Statistics of the Peshawar University. The society has also been affiliated with the International Statistical Institute since 1996, and publishes its publications though the International Statistical Institute on the international level.
