= Economic development in India =

The economic development in India followed socialist-inspired politicians for most of its independent history, including state-ownership of many sectors; India's per capita income increased at only around 1% annualised rate in the three decades after its independence. Since the mid-1980s, India has slowly opened up its markets through economic liberalisation. After more fundamental reforms since 1991 and their renewal in the 2000s, India has progressed towards a free market economy. The Indian economy is still performing well, with foreign investment and looser regulations driving significant growth in the country.

In the late 2000s, India's growth reached 7.5%, which will double the average income in a decade. IMF says that if India pushed more fundamental market reforms, it could sustain the rate and even reach the government's 2011 target of 10%. States have large responsibilities over their economies. The average annual growth rates (2007–12) for Gujarat (13.86%), Uttarakhand (13.66%), Bihar (10.15%) or Jharkhand (9.85%) were higher than for West Bengal (6.24%), Maharashtra (7.84%), Odisha (7.05%), Punjab (11.78%) or Assam (5.88%). India is the fourth largest economy in the world by nominal basis and the third largest by purchasing power parity adjusted exchange rates (PPP). On per capita basis, it ranks 140th in the world or 129th by PPP.

The economic growth has been driven by the expansion of the services that have been growing consistently faster than other sectors. It is argued that the pattern of Indian development has been a specific one and that the country may be able to skip the intermediate industrialisation-led phase in the transformation of its economic structure. Serious concerns have been raised about the jobless nature of the economic growth.

Favourable macroeconomic performance has been a necessary but not sufficient condition for the significant improvement in the human development indicators. Although the rate of poverty declined after economic reforms of 1991, the improvement in human development has been less than satisfactory. For instance, child malnutrition has continued to persist (46% in 2005–6).

The progress of economic changes in India is followed closely. The World Bank suggests that the most important priorities are public sector reform, infrastructure, agricultural and rural development, removal of labour regulations, reforms in lagging states, and HIV/AIDS. For 2018, India ranked 77th in Ease of Doing Business Index. According to Index of Economic Freedom World Ranking an annual survey on economic freedom of the nations, India ranks 123rd as compared with China and Russia which ranks 138th and 144th respectively in 2014.

At the turn of the century India's GDP was at around US$480 billion. As economic reforms picked up pace, India's GDP grew five-fold to reach US$2.2 trillion in 2015 (as per IMF estimates).

India's GDP growth during January–March period of 2015 was at 7.5% compared to China's 7%, making it the fastest growing MAJOR economy. During 2014–15, India's GDP growth recovered marginally to 7.3% from 6.9% in the previous fiscal. During 2014–15, India's services sector grew by 10.1%, manufacturing sector by 7.1% & agriculture by 0.2%. Indian Economy grew at 7.6 & 7.1 in FY 2015–16 and FY 2016–17 respectively as major reforms had taken place like demonetization and implementation of GST in FY 2016–17.

== History ==
Prior to India's Independence, from the period of 1900 to 1947, per capita income in India had either declined or stagnated. Post-Independence, Jawaharlal Nehru demonstrated his willingness to compromise socialism for the perceived benefit of the country to provide financial incentives for the expansion of private enterprise. However, after the crisis of 1957, India turned towards import substitution industrialization and introduced foreign exchange. The Nehru-Mahalanobis approach, often referred to as the Second Five Year Plan, emphasized the development of basic and heavy industries as a means of accelerating economic growth. These included steel, copper, petrochemicals, paper, coal, and oil. Mahalanobis strived for India to reach autonomy, ridding any outstanding debts. Critics disagreed with this approach, stating that World Bank's claim of Indian export prospects being low were falsified and due to India's inward-looking strategy, the growth opportunity of the world economy was missed. Nonetheless, over 1950–1965, India's acceleration of per capita income growth had increased an average of 1.7%, a value not exceeded since.

The discourse on the efficacy of the Nehru-Mahalanobis Strategy is commonly contested by economists. A criticism of the approach emphasizes the lack of resource allocation in the agriculture sector. It is argued that the misbalanced weightage towards the machine-making sector contributed to the increase in food-grain prices and thus, perpetuated poverty and malnutrition. Defenders of the strategy claim that it sought to increase agricultural output by increasing the output-capital ratio. This agreeably would have been accomplished through land-reforms, something the strategy did not address, not indicating a problem with the strategy itself.

== Agriculture ==
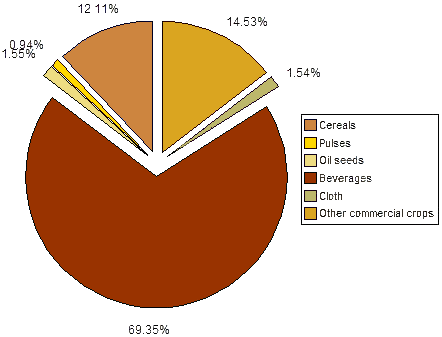
Composition of India's total production of foodgrains and commercial crops, in 2003–04, by weight

India ranks second worldwide in farm output. Agriculture and allied sectors like forestry, logging and fishing accounted for 18.6% of the GDP in 2005, employed 60% of the total workforce and despite a steady decline of its share in the GDP, is still the largest economic sector and plays a significant role in the overall socio-economic development of India. Yields per unit area of all crops have grown since 1950, due to the special emphasis placed on agriculture in the five-year plans and steady improvements in irrigation, technology, application of modern agricultural practices and provision of agricultural credit and subsidies since the green revolution.

India is the largest producer in the world of milk, cashew nuts, coconuts, tea, ginger, turmeric and black pepper. It also has the world's largest cattle population (193 million). It is the second largest producer of wheat, rice, sugar, groundnut and inland fish. It is the third largest producer of tobacco. India accounts for 10% of the world fruit production with first rank in the production of banana and sapota, also known as chiku.

The required level of investment for the development of marketing, storage and cold storage infrastructure is estimated to be huge. The government has implemented various schemes to raise investment in marketing infrastructure. Amongst these schemes are Construction of Rural Go downs, Market Research and Information Network, and Development / Strengthening of Agricultural Marketing Infrastructure, Grading and Standardisation.

Main problems in the agricultural sector, as listed by the World Bank, are:

- India's large agricultural subsidies are hampering productivity-enhancing investment.
- Overregulation of agriculture has increased costs, price risks and uncertainty.
- Government interventions in labour, land, and credit markets.
- Inadequate infrastructure and services.

=== Research and development ===
The Indian Agricultural Research Institute (IARI), established in 1905, was responsible for the research leading to the "Indian Green Revolution" of the 1970s. The Indian Council of Agricultural Research (ICAR) is the apex body in kundiure and related allied fields, including research and education. The Union Minister of Agriculture is the President of the ICAR. The Indian Agricultural Statistics Research Institute develops new techniques for the design of agricultural experiments, analyses data in agriculture, and specialises in statistical techniques for animal and plant breeding. Prof. M. S. Swaminathan is known as "Father of the Green Revolution" and heads the MS Swaminathan Research Foundation. He is known for his advocacy of environmentally sustainable agriculture and sustainable food security.

== Industrial output ==
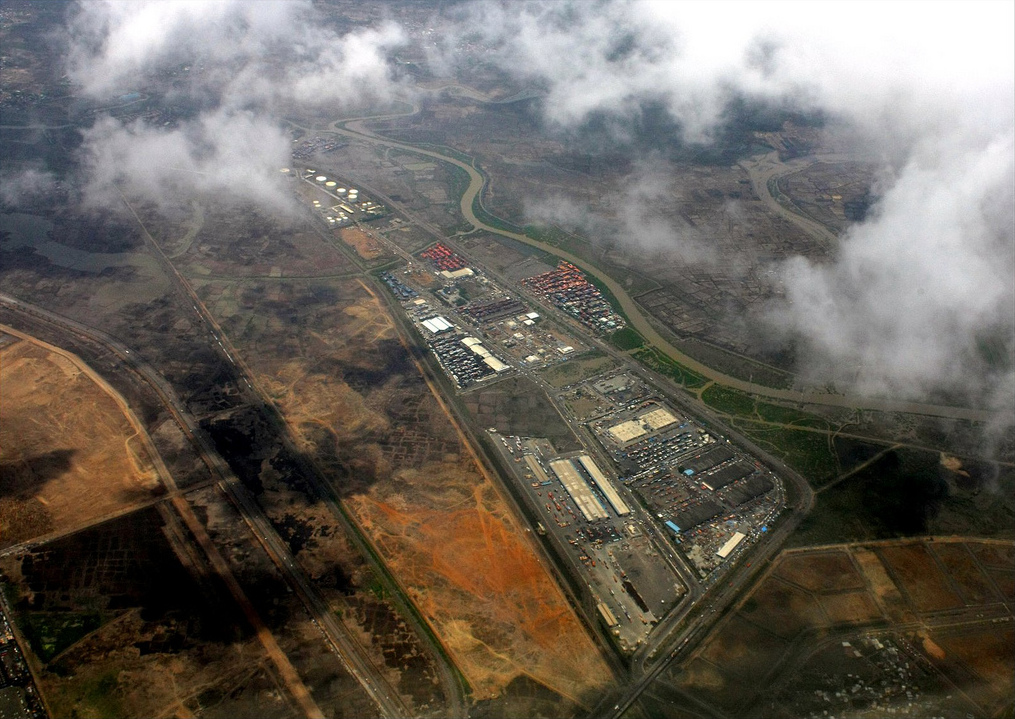
An industrial zone near Mumbai

India is fifth in the world in factory output. Major clusters of manufacturing are mainly concentrated in the states of Maharashtra, Gujarat, Karnataka, Tamil Nadu, Telangana and Andhra Pradesh due to relatively better infrastructure and quality of labor force. Manufacturing sector in addition to mining, quarrying, electricity and gas together account for 27.6% of the GDP and employ 17% of the total workforce. Economic reforms introduced after 1991 brought foreign competition, led to privatisation of certain public sector industries, opened up sectors hitherto reserved for the public sector and led to an expansion in the production of fast-moving consumer goods. India has emerged as the second largest manufacturer of mobile phones in the world with smartphone exports exceeding $10 billion in FY 2022–23. India has also emerged as the fourth largest manufacturer of automobiles behind only China, United States and Japan. India produced approximately 4.4 million cars in 2021.

Post-liberalisation, the Indian private sector, which was usually run by oligopolies of old family firms and required political connections to prosper was faced with foreign competition, including the threat of cheaper Chinese imports. It has since handled the change by squeezing costs, revamping management, focusing on designing new products and relying on low labour costs and technology. Under the Modi Government, various initiatives are taking place like Make In India campaign, to boost the Indian industries. This will help the economy to grow as budding entrepreneurs will open industries and local things will get promoted.

== Services ==
India is fifteenth in services output. Service industry employ English-speaking Indian workers on the supply side and on the demand side, has increased demand from foreign consumers interested in India's service exports or those looking to outsource their operations. India's IT industry, despite contributing significantly to its balance of payments, accounts for only about 1% of the total GDP or 1/50 of the total services.

During the Internet bubble that led up to 2000, heavy investments in undersea fibre-optic cables linked Asia with the rest of the world. The fall that followed the economic boom resulted in the auction of cheap fiber optic cables at one-tenth of their original price. This development resulted in widely available low-cost communications infrastructure. All of these investments and events, not to mention a swell of available talent, resulted in India becoming almost overnight the centre for outsourcing of Business process. Within this sector and events, the ITES-BPO sector has become a big employment generator especially amongst young college graduates. The number of professionals employed by IT and ITES sectors is estimated at 1.3 million as of March 2006. Also, Indian IT-ITES is estimated to have helped create an additional 3 million job opportunities through indirect, induced and in helpful manner have created employment.

== GDP growth rate ==
Since the economic liberalisation of 1991, India's GDP has been growing at a higher rate. The following table has been collected from public data archives with data from the World Bank:

| Year | Growth (real) (%) |
|---|---|
| 2000 | 3.841 |
| 2001 | 4.824 |
| 2002 | 3.804 |
| 2003 | 7.86 |
| 2004 | 7.923 |
| 2005 | 7.923 |
| 2006 | 8.061 |
| 2007 | 7.661 |
| 2008 | 3.087 |
| 2009 | 7.862 |
| 2010 | 8.498 |
| 2011 | 5.241 |
| 2012 | 5.456 |
| 2013 | 6.386 |
| 2014 | 7.41 |
| 2015 | 7.996 |
| 2016 | 8.17 |
| 2017 | 7.168 |
| 2018 | 6.982 |

GDP growth rate is unequal within India. For the year 2015–16, GDP growth rates of Andhra Pradesh (10.99%), Bihar (10.27%) and Madhya Pradesh (10.16%) were higher than Maharashtra (8%), Odisha (6.16%) and Punjab (5.96%).

== Companies ==
47 Indian companies were listed in the Forbes Global 2000 ranking for 2015. The 10 leading companies were:

| World Rank | Company | Logo | Industry | Revenue (billion $) | Profits (billion $) | Assets (billion $) | Market Value (billion $) |
|---|---|---|---|---|---|---|---|
| 142 | Reliance Industries | | Oil & Gas Operations | 71.7 | 3.7 | 76.6 | 42.9 |
| 152 | State Bank of India | State Bank of India logo | Banking | 40.8 | 2.3 | 400.6 | 33 |
| 183 | Oil and Natural Gas Corporation | | Oil & Gas Operations | 28.7 | 4.4 | 59.3 | 43.7 |
| 263 | Tata Motors | | | 42.3 | 2.7 | 34.7 | 28.8 |
| 283 | ICICI Bank | | Banking | 14.2 | 1.9 | 124.8 | 30 |
| 431 | NTPC | | Utilities | 12.9 | 1.9 | 35.4 | 20.2 |
| 463 | Tata Steel | | Materials | 32.77 | 3.08 | 31.16 | 2.46 |
| 349 | Indian Oil Corporation | | Oil & Gas Operations | 74.3 | 1.2 | 44.7 | 14.6 |
| 485 | HDFC | | Banking | 8.4 | 1.4 | 84.3 | 41.6 |
| 485 | TCS | | Information Technology | 15.1 | 3.5 | 11 | 80.3 |

== India's resource consumption ==
=== Oil ===
India consumes the second-largest amount of oil in the Asia-Pacific region behind China. The combination of rising oil consumption and fairly unwavering production levels leaves India highly dependent on imports to meet the consumption needs.

=== Natural gas ===
As per the Oil and Gas Journal, India had 38 trillion cubic feet (1.1×10^{12} m^{3}) of confirmed natural gas reserves in 2004.

India imports small amounts of natural gas. In 2004, India consumed about 1,089×10^{9} cu ft (3.08×10^{10} m^{3}) of natural gas, the first year in which the country showed net natural gas imports. During 2004, India imported 93×10^{9} cu ft (2.6×10^{9} m^{3}) of liquefied natural gas (LNG) from Qatar.

As in the oil sector, India's state-owned companies account for the bulk of natural gas production. ONGC and Oil India Ltd. (OIL) are the leading companies with respect to production volume, whilst some foreign companies take part in upstream developments in joint-ventures and production sharing contracts (PSCs). Reliance Industries, a privately owned Indian company, will also have a bigger role in the natural gas sector as a result of a large natural gas find in 2002 in the Krishna Godavari basin.

The Gas Authority of India Ltd. (GAIL) holds an effective control on natural gas transmission and allocation activities. In December 2006, the Minister of Petroleum and Natural Gas issued a new policy that allows foreign investors, private domestic companies, and national oil companies to hold up to 100% equity stakes in pipeline projects. Whilst GAIL's domination in natural gas transmission and allocation is not ensured by statute, it will continue to be the leading player in the sector because of its existing natural gas infrastructure.

== Issues ==
=== Regulation and public sector ===
India ranked 63 on the Ease of Doing Business Index in 2020, compared with 108 for Pakistan, 31 for People's Republic of China, 131 for Nigeria, 124 for Brazil, and 73 for Indonesia.

Corruption in many forms has been one of the pervasive problems affecting India. For decades, the red tape, bureaucracy and the Licence Raj that had strangled private enterprise. The economic reforms of 1991 cut some of the worst regulations that had been used in corruption.

Corruption is still large. A 2005 study by Transparency International (TI) India found that more than half of those surveyed had firsthand experience of paying a bribe or peddling influence to get a job done in a public office. The chief economic consequences of corruption are the loss to the exchequer, an unhealthy climate for investment and an increase in the cost of government-subsidised services. The TI India study estimates the monetary value of petty corruption in 11 basic services provided by the government, like education, healthcare, judiciary, police, etc., to be around ₹211 billion (US$2.2 billion). India still ranks in the bottom quartile of developing nations in terms of the ease of doing business, and compared with China, the average time taken to secure the clearances for a startup or to invoke bankruptcy is much greater.

The Right to Information Act (2005) and equivalent acts in the states, that require government officials to furnish information requested by citizens or face punitive action, computerisation of services and various central and state government acts that established vigilance commissions have considerably reduced corruption or at least have opened up avenues to redress grievances. The 2006 report by Transparency International puts India at 70th place and states that significant improvements were made by India in reducing corruption.

=== Employment ===
India's labour force is growing by 2.5% every year, but employment is growing only at 2.3% a year. Official unemployment exceeds 9%. Regulation and other obstacles have discouraged the emergence of formal businesses and jobs. Almost 30% of workers are casual workers who work only when they are able to get jobs and remain unpaid for the rest of the time. Only 10% of the workforce is in regular employment. India's labour regulations are heavy even by developing country standards and analysts have urged the government to abolish them.

From the overall stock of an estimated 458 million workers, 394 million (86%) operate in the unorganised sector (of which 63% are self-employed) mostly as informal workers. There is a strong relationship between the quality of employment and social and poverty characteristics. The relative growth of informal employment was more rapid within the organised rather than the unorganised sector. This is also related to the flexibilisation of employment in the organised sector that is suggested by the increasing use of contract labour by employers in order to benefit from more flexible labour practices.

Children under 14 constitute 3.6% of the total labour force in the country. Of these children, 9 out of every 10 work in their own rural family settings. Around 85% of them are engaged in traditional agricultural activities. Less than 9% work in manufacturing, services and repairs. Child labour is a complex problem that is basically rooted in poverty. The Indian government is implementing the world's largest child labour elimination program, with primary education targeted for ~250 million. Numerous non-governmental and voluntary organisations are also involved. Special investigation cells have been set up in states to enforce existing laws banning employment of children (under 14) in hazardous industries. The allocation of the Government of India for the eradication of child labour was US$10 million in 1995–96 and US$16 million in 1996–97. The allocation for 2007 is US$21 million.

=== Environmental degradation ===
About 1.2 billion people in developing nations lack clean, safe water because most household and industrial wastes are dumped directly into rivers and lakes without treatment. This contributes to the rapid increase in waterborne diseases in humans. Out of India's 3119 towns and cities, just 209 have partial treatment facilities, and only 8 have full wastewater treatment facilities (WHO 1992). 114 cities dump untreated sewage and partially cremated bodies directly into the Ganges River. Downstream, the untreated water is used for drinking, bathing, and washing. This situation is typical of many rivers in India as well as other developing countries. Globally, but especially in developing nations like India where people cook with fuelwood and coal over open fires, about 4 billion humans suffer continuous exposure to smoke. In India, particulate concentrations in houses are reported to range from 8,300 to 15,000 μg/m^{3}, greatly exceeding the 75 μg/m^{3} maximum standard for indoor particulate matter in the United States. Changes in ecosystem biological diversity, evolution of parasites, and invasion by exotic species all frequently result in disease outbreaks such as cholera which emerged in 1992 in India. The frequency of AIDS/HIV is increasing. In 1996, about 46,000 Indians out of 2.8 million (1.6% of the population) tested were found to be infected with HIV.

=== Effect on women ===
Economic development in India has had a varying effect on women depending on their age, education, and location. Traditionally in India women's role is in the household. As girls they are raised to work for and better their family. Their work, therefore, mostly consists of household duties and is not a part of the formal economy. Because of this India consistently compares poorly to other countries as far as female employment rates. Currently India ranks 11th from the bottom in female labor participation out of the 131 countries with data available. In addition, women who do work experience discrimination; on average they make 62% of what their male counterparts make for the same position.

Since the 1990s there has been significant economic growth and expansion in India, this has had an effect on how women operate in the workforce there. Women's labor force participation has fallen from 37% in 2004–2005 to 27% in 2009–2019. So with the recent economic growth and development in India, the country has not seen an equal overall growth in jobs for women. This can be broken down further, however, because certain demographics of women in India have seen job rates decline while some have seen them rise. Informal work, which is not included in job rate percentages, has risen for poor, rural, uneducated women while their formal job rate has declined; Microcredit and social help groups have helped poor women connect and work together in the informal job sector. Women with higher education who mostly live in urban areas have seen a rise in job rates.

An example of a booming industry for educated women in India is call centers. Many Western countries outsource their call center jobs to India, and these call centers have found that women often have more success at these positions than their male counterparts. These positions give young women in India a chance at independence from their family and the traditional role which women play. There are organizations in India that were created to support women's education and women in the workforce. In 1985 the Ministry of Human Resource Development was founded to improve female literacy rates, and to support women looking to join the work force. Similarly, in 1972 SEWA, the Self Employed Women's Association, was formed by self-employed and low wage women workers to support each other and organize to advocate for their rights.

== See also ==
- List of megaprojects in India
