= Feldman–Mahalanobis model =

Marxist model of economic development

The Feldman–Mahalanobis model is a Marxist model of economic development, created independently by Soviet economist Grigory Feldman in 1928 and Indian statistician Prasanta Chandra Mahalanobis in 1953. Mahalanobis became essentially the key economist of India's Second Five Year Plan, becoming subject to much of India's most dramatic economic debates.

The essence of the model is a shift in the pattern of industrial investment towards building up a domestic consumption goods sector. Thus the strategy suggests in order to reach a high standard in consumption, investment in building a capacity in the production of capital goods is firstly needed. A high enough capacity in the capital goods sector expands in the long-run the nation's consumer-goods production capacity.

This distinction between the two different types of goods was a clearer formulation of Marx's ideas in Das Kapital, and also helped people to better understand the extent of the trade off between the levels of immediate and future consumption. These ideas were first introduced in 1928 by Feldman, then an economist working for the GOSPLAN planning commission, where he presented theoretical arguments of a two-department scheme of growth. There is no evidence that Mahalanobis knew of Feldman's approach, being kept behind the borders of the USSR.

== Implementation of the model ==
The model was created as an analytical framework for India's Second Five-Year Plan in 1955 by appointment of Prime Minister Jawaharlal Nehru, as India felt there was a need to introduce a formal-plan model after the First Five Year Plan (1951–1956). The First Five-Year Plan stressed investment for capital accumulation in the spirit of the one-sector Harrod–Domar model. It argued that production required capital and that capital can be accumulated through investment: the faster one accumulates capital through investment, the higher the growth rate will be. The most fundamental criticisms of that course came from Mahalanobis, who when himself was working with a variant of it in 1951 and 1952. The criticisms were mostly around the model's inability to cope with the real constraints of the economy, in ignoring the fundamental choice problems of planning over time and the lack of connection between the model and the actual selection of projects for governmental expenditure. Subsequently, Mahalanobis introduced his two-sector model, which he later expanded into the four-sector version.

== Assumptions ==
The assumptions under which the Mahalanobis model is posited are as follows:

- We assume a closed economy.
- The economy consists of two sectors: consumption goods sector C and capital goods sector K.
- Capital goods are non-shiftable.
- Full capacity production.
- Investment is determined by supply of capital goods.
- No changes in prices.
- Capital is the only scarce factor.
- Production of capital goods is independent of the production of consumer goods.

== Basics of the model ==
The full-capacity output equation is as follows:

$Y_{t} = Y_{0} \left \lbrace 1 + \alpha_{0} \frac{\lambda_{k}\beta_{k} + \lambda_{c}\beta_{c}}{\lambda_{k}\beta_{k}} \left \lbrack (1 + \lambda_{k}\beta_{k})^t - 1 \right \rbrack \right \rbrace$

In the model the growth rate is given by both the share of investment in the capital goods sector, $\lambda_{k}$, and the share of investment in the consumer goods sector - $\lambda_{c}$. If we choose to increase the value of $\lambda_{k}$ to be larger than $\lambda_{c}$, this will initially result in a slower growth in the short-run, but in the long run will exceed the former growth rate choice with a higher growth rate and an ultimately higher level of consumption. In other words, if this method is used, only in the long run will investment into the capital goods produce consumer goods, resulting in no short run gains.

== Criticisms ==
One of the most common criticisms of the model is that Mahalanobis pays hardly any attention to the savings constraint, which he assumes comes from the industrial sector. Developing countries, however, do not have this tendency, as the first stages of saving usually come from the agricultural sector. He also does not mention taxation, an important potential source of capital for the state as viewed by Neoclassical Macroeconomics.

A more serious criticism is the limitation of the assumptions under which this model holds, an example being the limitation of foreign trade. This cannot be justifiable to developing countries today. Another criticism is that a country, to use this model, would have to be large enough to contain all the raw resources needed for production to be self-sustainable, and, therefore, the model would not apply for smaller countries.

== Empirical case ==
Essentially the model was put into practice in 1956 as the theoretical pathway of India's Second Five Year Plan. However, after two years, the first problems started to emerge. Problems such as unexpected and unavoidable costs contributed to increased money supply and growing inflation. The biggest problem was the fall in the foreign exchange reserve due to liberalised import policy and international tension, leading to modifications in the Second Plan in 1958. It was finally abandoned and replaced by the Third Five Year Plan in 1961.

== See also ==
- Harrod–Domar model
- Economic growth
- Development economics
- Mahalanobis
- Indian Economy
- Five-year plans of India
