= Suhas Pandurang Sukhatme =

Indian scientist, teacher and author

- Born: 5 November 1938 (age 87); Baroda, Maharashtra, India
- Education: IIT BHU; MIT
- Occupation: Scientist
- Spouse: Shobha Sukhatme
- Children: Gaurav Sukhatme; Jai Sukhatme
- Parent(s): Pandurang Vasudeo Sukhatme; Indumati Sukhatme
- Awards: Padma Shri; Prince of Wales Gold Medal; S. S. Bhatnagar Prize; IIT Lifetime Achievement Award; Om Prakash Bhasin Award

Suhas Pandurang Sukhatme is an Indian scientist, teacher, author and a former chairman of the Atomic Energy Regulatory Board of the Government of India, known for his expertise in heat transfer and energy technologies. He was honoured by the Government of India, in 2001, with the fourth highest Indian civilian award of Padma Shri.

== Biography ==
Suhas Pandurang Sukhatme was born to Indumati Sukhatme and Pandurang Vasudeo Sukhatme, renowned statistician and a Padma Bhushan award winner, on 5 November 1938 at Baroda in the Western Indian state of Maharashtra. He graduated in Engineering in 1958 from the Indian Institute of Technology (BHU) Varanasi and pursued his higher studies at the Massachusetts Institute of Technology. He secured a master's degree (SM) in 1960, a higher degree in Engineering (MechE) in 1961, and a doctoral degree (ScD) in 1964.

During his stay at MIT, he worked as a research assistant during 1959–64. He moved to Dynatech Corporation where he worked for a year as a staff engineer. In 1965, he returned to India to join the Indian Institute of Technology Bombay as an assistant professor at the department of mechanical engineering. After a series of promotions, as the professor in 1970, as the head of the department in 1973, and as the deputy director in 1975, he became the director of the institution in 1995, a post he held till he retired in 2000 with the title of the Professor Emeritus of the institution. During this period, he also had a brief stint at the Iowa State University as a visiting professor in the academic year, 1982–83. Post retirement from IIT Bombay, he worked as the chairman of the Atomic Energy Regulatory Board of the Government of India from 2000 till 2005.

Suhas Sukhatme holds the life memberships of the Indian Society for Heat and Mass Transfer (ISHMT) and the Solar Energy Society of India and is a former member of the Indian National Science Academy council. He serves as a member of the Promotions and Assessment Committee of the Indian Institute of Science, Bangalore, Nuclear Sciences Research Board of the Department of Atomic Energy, and the advisory councils of the Indian Institute of Technology Bombay and the Indian Institute of Technology, Gandhinagar. He also sits in the Governing Board of two national institutions, the Institute of Chemical Technology, Mumbai and the National Institute of Industrial Engineering (NITIE), Mumbai.

Sukhatme is an author of over 70 scientific papers and three books viz. A Textbook on Heat Transfer, Solar Energy - Principles of Thermal Collection and Storage and The Real Brain Drain. His contributions are known behind the establishment of an inter-disciplinary postgraduate and research programme in Energy Systems Engineering at IIT Bombay. The program has grown over the years to become an independent department, the Department of Energy Science and Engineering. He has also assisted in the formation of Mumbai-based institutions, the Shailesh J Mehta School of Management and the Kanwal Rekhi School of Information Technology.

Suhas Sukhatme is married to Shobha, a medical doctor and has two children, Gaurav, a member of faculty at the University of Southern California and Jai, teaching at University of Wisconsin-Madison. The couple lives in Powai, Mumbai.

== Awards and recognitions ==
Sukhatme was awarded the Prince of Wales Gold Medal in 1958 by the Banares Hindu University for topping the University examinations . In 1983, he received the Shanti Swarup Bhatnagar Prize for Science and Technology from the Council of Scientific and Industrial Research (CSIR). In 2001, he received the Om Prakash Bhasin Award from Om Prakash Bhasin Foundation and the Lifetime Achievement Award from the Indian Institute of Technology, Mumbai, the first recipient of the award. A recipient of the degree of the Doctor of Science (Honoris Causa) from the Banares Hindu University, Sukhatme was awarded the civilian honour of Padma Shri by the Government of India in 2001.

Sukhatme delivered the Daulat Singh Kothari Memorial Award Lecture in 2005 at the Indian National Science Academy (INSA) where he is an elected Fellow. He is also an elected Fellow of Maharashtra Academy of Sciences, Indian Academy of Sciences, Indian National Academy of Engineering and the National Academy of Sciences, India . He is an elected member of the Society of Sigma Xe and a Fellow of the Indian Society for Technical Education.
