= Nirmal Kumari Mahalanobis =

Indian Author (1900 - 1981)

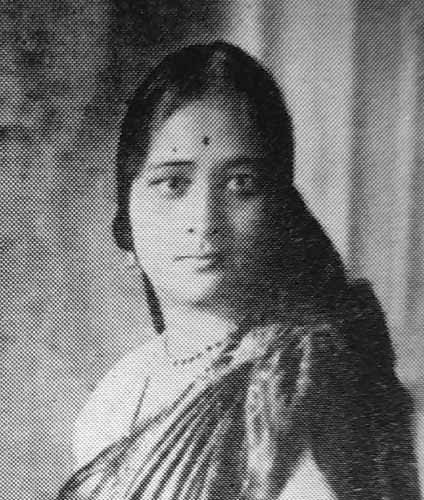
- Nirmalkumari c. 1930s
- Native name: নির্মলকুমারী মহলানবিশ
- Born: 24 October 1900
- Died: 13 March 1981 (aged 80)
- Occupation: Author
- Language: Bengali
- Citizenship: British Raj; India
- Subject: Rabindranath Tagore
- Notable works: 'Kobi' and 'Rani': Memoirs and Correspondences of Nirmalkumari Mahalanobis and Rabindranath Tagore
- Spouse: Prasanta Chandra Mahalanobis

Nirmal Kumari Mahalanobis (Bengali pronunciation: [nɪrˈməl kuˈmɑːri məˌhɑːləˈnoʊbɪs]; 24 October 1900 – 13 March 1981) was an Indian author who wrote memoirs dedicated to Rabindranath Tagore. She was the wife of P. C. Mahalanobis, an Indian statistician and the founder of Indian Statistical Institute (ISI), Calcutta. She also had been a close support companion of Tagore, especially in the last years of his life. The memoirs of conversations between them are well documented in her book, Kobi and Rani.

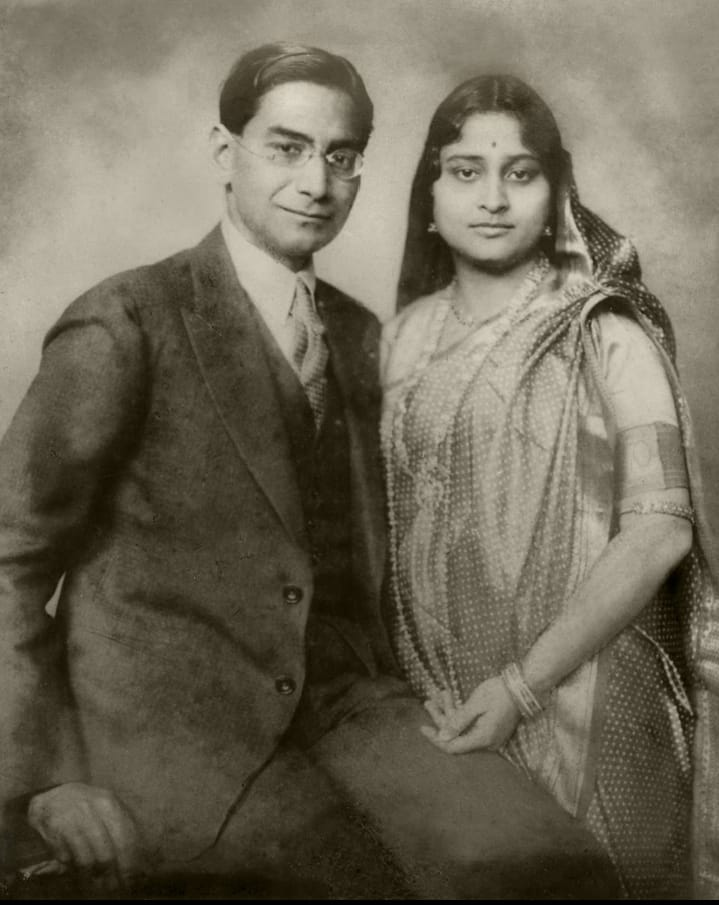
P. C. Mahalanobis and Rani Mahalanobis, 1923

== Early life ==
Mahalanobis was born on 24 October 1900 in Calcutta, British Raj. Her father was the Bengali educationalist, Heramba Chandra Moitra who also had been a member of Brahmo Samaj. In Calcutta, she met with the scientist, Prasanta Chandra Mahalanobis with whom she married on 27 February 1923. This move was met with initial resistance by Heramba, her father who was infuriated with P. C. Mahalanobis showing opposition to various clauses of membership of the student wing of the Brahmo Samaj, including prohibition against the members' smoking and drinking. Therefore, Sir Nilratan Sarkar, had been present at the wedding in place of the father of the bride. Rabindranath Tagore had also been present during the wedding. He had gifted to the couple the original manuscript of his recently published work, Basanta. Dedicating his work to them, Tagore wrote on its first page:

প্রশান্ত, রানী
তোমাদের ই মিলন বসন্ত দিবেন
কবি বসন্ত গান আনি
সুন্দর প্রেম সাজুক আনন্দে
পরুক গোলায় সুরের মালাখানি

Prasanta, Rani
In this spring of your union
the poet evokes the songs of Spring;
Let your love dress in joy
and wear the garland of melody.

Mahalanobis' family lived in the Baranagar house called "Sashi Villa" that is situated at 265/19, Gopal Lal Tagore Road, Baranagar. It was often visited by Tagore as it's the place where he wrote few of his poems. In 1960, the house was renovated as Mukh Bodhir Vidyalaya ("School of Deaf and Dumb").

At the time when P. C. Mahalanobis worked at Indian Meteorological Department (IMD), Tagore also lived in Alipore observatory building with the Mahalanobis' from 1923 to 1928. Despite having a room for himself, he preferred to write his poems under the shade of a banyan tree. Today the observatory has been changed to a museum but the banyan tree is still preserved in its place.

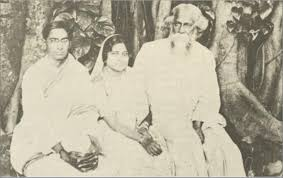
Tagore with P. C. and Rani Mahalanobis in Alipore Observatory, 1926

== Career ==
In 1926, both Prasanta and Nirmal Mahalanobis toured with Rabindranath Tagore on a seven month long trip to different countries in Europe which included Italy, Switzerland, Austria, Sweden, Norway, Germany, Yugoslavia, Hungary, Romania and Greece. This was followed by their trip to South India and Ceylon in 1928.

Tagore had profound respect for her thus referring to her as 'Rani' after his second child, Renuka Devi, who died of tuberculosis aged 12. Mahalanobis had travelled with her later husband, P. C. Mahalanobis and Tagore to different countries in Europe and to South India including Ceylon (now Sri Lanka) the accounts of which were also written by her.

=== Kobi and Rani ===
The memoirs of the above mentioned travels are well written in her book (in Bengali) that was published in 1941 long after Tagore's death. In it their travel anthology is divided into two parts namely, Kobir Shongey Europey (transl. With the poet in Europe) and Kabir Shongey Dakshinattey (transl. With the poet in South India). It also includes the translated 60 letters called Pathe o Pather Pranthe (transl. On the road and beyond it) that Tagore wrote to Rani Mahalanobis out of a total of 500 that he wrote to Rani in his lifetime. Three other articles written by Mahalanobis has also been included in this volume which are Om Pita Nohosi ("You are my holy father"), Tomaso Ma Jyotirgomayo ("Your mother is brilliant") and one for children which was published in the Autumn Festive Number of Anandamela in 1941.

A month before Tagore died, he remembered Mahalanobis as given in the preface to Kabir Shongey Dakshinattey,

You are one of my last friends. I know that even if others go away, you will not leave me.

The book had been translated by Somdatta Mondal, former English professor at Viswa-Bharati university which was established by Tagore with funds from US and Europe; and adopted Oriental (Gurukul) education system for the students.

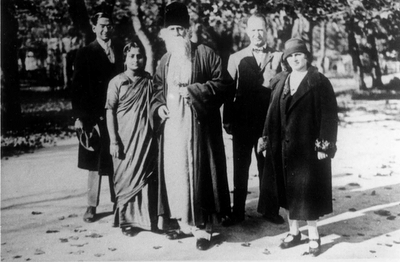
Tagore with P. C. and Rani Mahalanobis in Balatonfured, Hungary

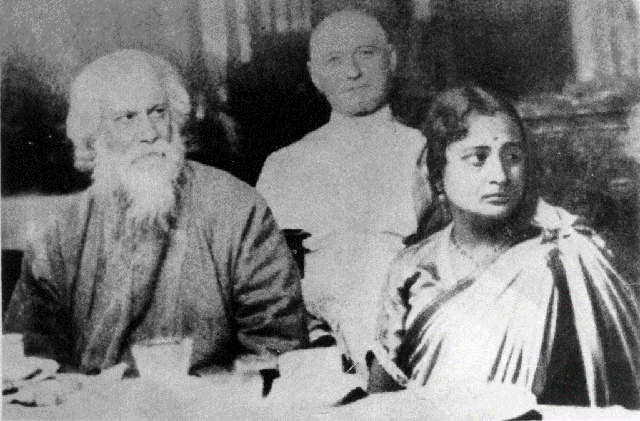
Tagore with Rani Mahalanobis in Kesztehly, Hungary

=== Baishe Srabon ===
This book was written by Mahalanobis as a tribute to the infamous day on which Tagore died while being surrounded by Mahalanobis and his servant. In it the events leading to Tagore's failing health, his last wish and the events following his death are all recorded. According to Mahalanobis, Tagore's last wish right before he died on 7 August 1941 was to leave his corpse in free will to the ground in Shantiniketan, his birth place.

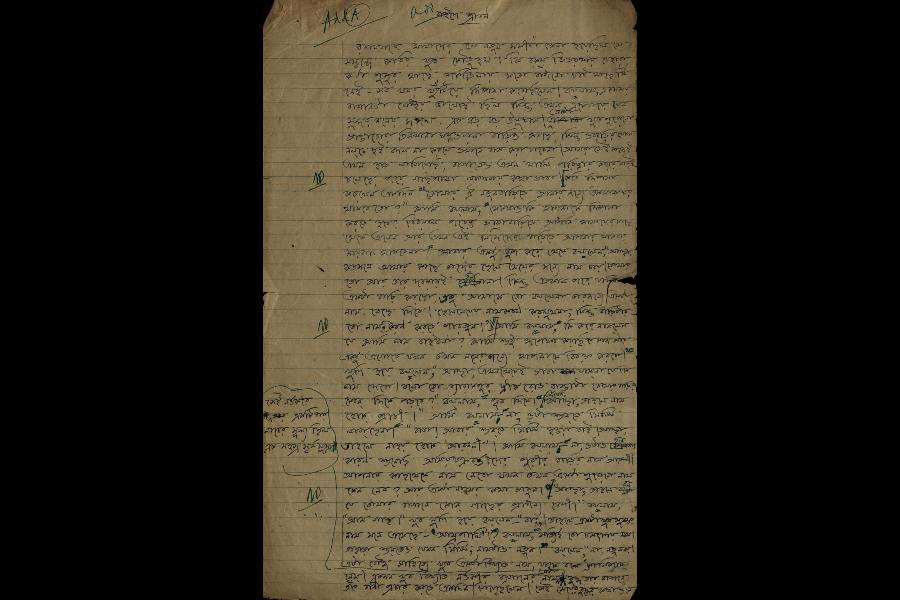
Baishe Srabon

This wish unfortunately could not be fulfilled as the Jorasanko house was forced open and the grieving crowd had entered which then took him away for last rites just as a huge populace waiting outside was grieving his demise.

=== Indian Statistical Institute ===
In the annual reports of ISI, it is stated that Rani Mahalanobis made donations to ISI which led to Raj Chandra Bose getting the part time scholarship to study in the institute. It was with this scholarship that R. C. Bose made out the Mahalanobis D^{2} statistic. The Mahalanobis' family also hosted distinguished scientists and their families at the time.

== Legacy ==
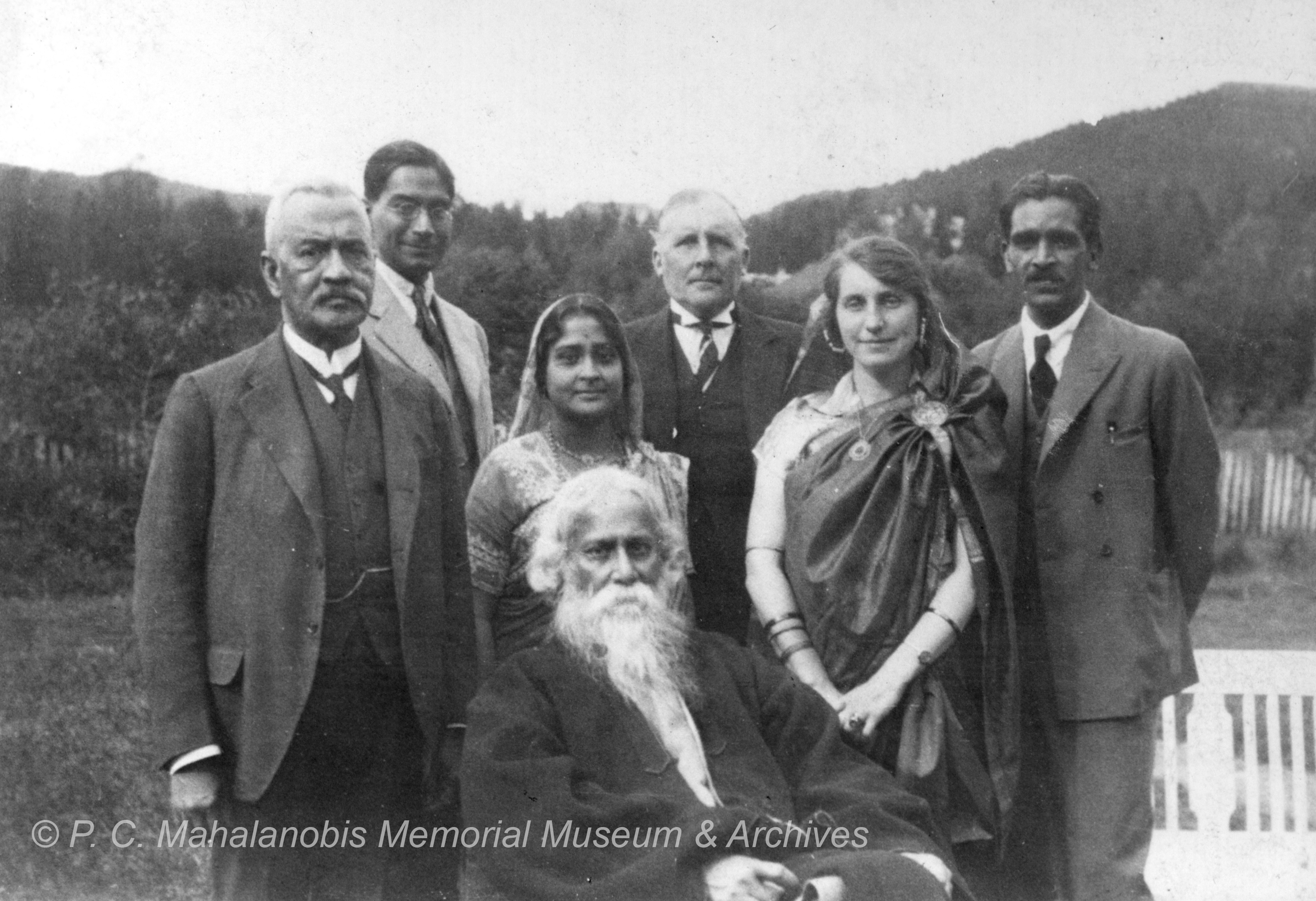
P. C. and Rani Mahalanobis with Tagore in Oslo, Norway, 1926

In 2024, as a part of 3 day long celebration of Tagore's achievements at Kolkata Centre for Creativity, a rare collection of photos and other memorabilia during Tagore's Europe tour and Mahalanobis' residences was put on display. One of these images include a group photo of Tagore, Prasanta Mahalanobis, Rani Mahalanobis, Satyendra Prasanna Sinha and Andrea Butchenson in Oslo, 1926. Another item put on display was a tribute to Tagore for naming Mahalanobis house as Netrakona. One page from the manuscript of Baishe Srabon was also shown.

On the first floor of ISI, the chatal (the open lounge), the study room and the residential rooms of P. C. and Rani Mahalanobis are reinstated in order to give an authentic impression of the period in 1920s.
