= Swarna Jayanti Shahari Rozgar Yojana =

Swarna Jayanti Shahari Rozgar Yojana (SJSRY) in India is a Centrally Sponsored Scheme which came into effect on 1 December 1997. The scheme strives to provide gainful employment and livelihood to the urban unemployed and underemployed poor, through encouraging the setting up of self-employment ventures or provision of wage employment.

The SJSRY scheme is being implemented on a cost-sharing basis between the Centre and the States in the ratio of 75:25. Given the low allocations for the scheme, only about 2 lakh urban poor under skill development and 50,000 under self-employment are being benefitted under SJSRY annually. The target under skill development of the urban poor is very small considering that the number of urban poor was estimated at 81 million in 2004-05 and that nationally a target of 500 million persons to be skill-trained by 2022 has been fixed by the National Council on Skill Development.

In 2013, the SJSRY was replaced by the National Urban Livelihood Mission(NULM), which is now Deendayal Antyodaya Yojana – National Urban Livelihoods Mission (DAY-NULM). Both are simply employment schemes for self-employment and wage-employment of urban poors. As of 2022, no employment guarantee scheme is present for urban areas on the lines of MGNREGA in rural areas.
