= National Food For Work Programme =

Work programme launched by Indian government, 2004

The National Food for Work Programme (NFWP), 2004 was launched by the Ministry of Rural Development, central government on 14 November 2004 in 150 of the most backward districts of India to generate supplementary wage employment. The programme is open to all Indian poor who are ready to do manual unskilled labour work sponsored scheme. Food grains are provided to the States free of cost. The transportation cost, handling charges, and taxes on food grains will, however, be the responsibility of the States. It has always been better to supply food grains free of cost instead of distributing money among the poor families. The eligibility criteria were relaxed to provide for both Below Poverty Line (BPL) and Above Poverty Line (APL) families. This is one of a number of schemes built on the food for work concept.

The collector is the primary or nodal officer at the district level and has overall responsibility for planning, implementation, coordination, good monitoring and supervision. From 2004-2005, ₹2,020 crore (US$210 million) have been allocated for the programme in addition to 18 million tonnes of food grains.

Meal is provided at workplaces and the wages are paid on a daily basis.

The programme has since been subsumed in National Rural Employment Guarantee Act (NREGA) of 2005 which has come in force in 200 identified districts of the country including 150 NFFWP districts. MGNREGA is now the chief right based employment guarantee scheme.
