= Indian Agricultural Statistics Research Institute =

Agriculture institute

- Parent institution: Indian Council of Agricultural Research
- Established: 1930
- Focus: Agricultural Statistics; Statistical Techniques
- Affiliation: Indian Agricultural Research Institute
- Key people: Rajender Parsad (Director)
- Location: New Delhi, India
- Coordinates: 28°38′00″N 77°10′22″E
- Website: iasri.icar.gov.in

The Indian Agricultural Statistics Research Institute is an institute under the Indian Council of Agricultural Research (ICAR) with the mandate for developing new techniques for the design of agricultural experiments as well as to analyze data in agriculture. The institute is affiliated with and is located in the campus of the Indian Agricultural Research Institute, a deemed university, at Pusa in New Delhi. The institute includes sections that specialize in statistical techniques for animal and plant breeding, bioinformatics, sampling, experimental design, modelling and forecasting.

== Origin and history ==
In 1930, the then Imperial Council of Agricultural Research started a statistical unit to assist the State Departments of Agriculture and Animal Husbandry in planning their experiments, analysis of experimental data, interpretation of results and rendering advice on the formulation of the technical programmes of the Council. This unit was established on the recommendation of Leslie Coleman.

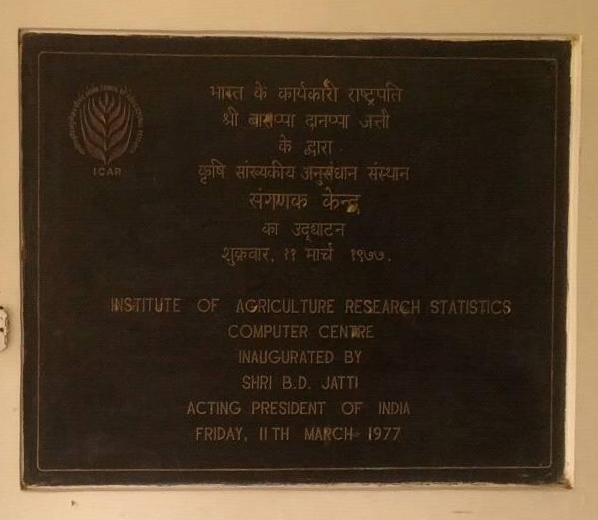
Foundation stone of the computer centre building

This unit was headed from 1940 by the statistician Dr. P.V.Sukhatme who had studied with Jerzy Neyman in London. The early research was on reliable methods for collecting yield statistics of principal food crops.

Further research in sampling and statistics was initiated and this became a Statistical Branch in 1945. The branch soon acquired international recognition as a centre for research and training in the field of Agricultural Statistics. In 1949 it was named as Statistical Wing of the Indian Council of Agricultural Research (ICAR). In 1952, at the recommendations of Food and Agriculture Organization (FAO) experts Dr Frank Yates and Dr D. J. Finney it was expanded and in 1955 it moved to the Pusa campus. On 2 July 1959 it was renamed as the Institute of Agricultural Research Statistics (IARS).

In 1964, a Memorandum of Understanding was signed with the Indian Agricultural Research Institute (IARI), New Delhi and courses in M.Sc. and Ph.D. degrees were offered.

In 1964, it was one of the few institutes with a computer, an IBM 1620 Model-II Electronic Computer. In 1970, it became a full institute under the ICAR and the name was changed to Indian Agricultural Statistics Research Institute (IASRI) on 1 January 1978.

In 1977, a third generation computer Burroughs B-4700 system was installed in a new building. From 1991 to 1995, the old computers were replaced by new networked PC systems.
