= Bibliography of Ramakrishna =

Ramakrishna (1836–1886) is a famous mystic of nineteenth-century India. Ramakrishna never wrote down the details of his own life. Sources for his life and teachings come from the writings of his disciples and live witnesses. Ramakrishna's recorded sayings mainly come from the last four years of his life.

== The Gospel of Sri Ramakrishna ==
The book Sri Sri Rāmakrishna Kathāmrita by Mahendranath Gupta under the pseudonym M., was published in five volumes in 1902, 1905, 1908, 1910 and 1932. Mahendranath Gupta recorded his daily interactions with Ramakrishna in his diary, which were subsequently published as Sri-Sri-Ramakrishna-Kathamrta in 5 Volumes in Bengali. According to Romain Rolland, the information in these volumes is available with "stenographic precision".

The English translations of Kathamrita were published by Swami Nikhilananda in his book The Gospel of Sri Ramakrishna. According to scholars Neevel, Lex Hixon the book provides authentic information about Ramakrishna. The book was voted as one of the "100 Most Important Spiritual Books of the 20th Century" by the American scholars convened by Philip Zaleski and HarperCollins publishers, However, scholars argue that the book has been bowdlerized. Kripal argues that although Nikhilananda calls it a literal translation, he "substantially altered Gupta's text, combining the five parallel narratives", "as well as deleting some passages which he claimed were of no particular interest to English-speaking readers.". However other scholars Sil, Swami Tyagananda, Somnath Bhattacharrya, Swami Atmajnananda argue that Kripal's observations are incorrect. They also argue that Nikhilananda's translations were faithful and took into consideration the western decorum. Peter Heehs argues, that the translation in The Gospel of Sri Ramakrishna turns Ramakrishna's vigorous and occasionally coarse Bengali into English of near-Victorian propriety and do not convey as much as the Bengali originals, however, Heehs writes that the works on M and Saradananda remain documents of considerable value, which have allowed Ramakrishna to speak to a worldwide audience. Lex Hixon writes that the Gospel is "spiritually authentic" and "powerful rendering of the Kathamrita into dignified English."

A recent translation, by Dharm Pal Gupta, is subtitled "word to word translation of the original Bengali edition" (see "other books" below).

== Books on Ramakrishna ==
Keshabchandra Sen's Paramahamsa Deber Ukti (1878) is the earliest known work on Ramakrishna. Keshab also publicized Ramakrishna's teachings in the journals of his religious movement New Dispensation over a period of several years, which was instrumental in bringing Ramakrishna to the attention of a wider audience, especially the Bhadralok (English-educated classes of Bengal) and the Europeans residing in India. This was followed by Sureshchandra Dutta's Pramahamsa Ramakrishna Deber Ukti (1884)

Sri Sri Ramakrishna Paramahamsadever Jivan-vrittanta (1880) by Ram Chandra Dutta, is one of the earliest published biography of Ramakrishna. Religious scholar, Narasingha Sil and Jeffery Kripal argue that Datta's Jivanvrttanta is the most scandalous biography of Ramakrishna, "containing the lurid details of his sadhana as well as his quite suggestive encounters with his patron Mathur." They cite a letter written by Swami Vivekananda in 1884 asking to "Avoid all irregular indecent expressions about sex etc...because other nations think it the height of indecency to mention such things, and his life in English is going to be read by the whole world" and calling Ramchandra Dutta's translation a "bosh and rot". They also argue that Ramchandra Datta faced a possible lawsuit from Swami Vivekananda. However, Swami Atmajnanananda and Pravrajika Vrajaprana argue that as of 1995, this book has been published in nine Bengali editions. Kripal later withdrew his claim that the Ramakrishna Mission has consciously concealed information.

In 1887, Akshay Kumar Sen wrote Ramakrishna's life in verse — Sri Sri Ramakrishna Punthi in Bengali. Akshay Kumar Sen later wrote Padye Sri Sri Ramakrishna Paramahamsa Dever Upadesh and Sri Sri Ramakrishna Mahima.

Sri Sri Ramakrishna Lilaprasanga by Swami Saradananda. The book was begun in 1909 and left partially incomplete at the author's death in 1927. Scholars Romain Rolland, Isherwood considered Swami Saradananda an authority both as a philosopher and as an historian on Ramakrishna.

My Master, speeches by Swami Vivekananda in 1896. Religious Scholar Sil argues that Ramakrishna is a product of Vivekananda's "Mythmaking and Propaganda", Scholars Max Müller, Walter G. Neevel, Christopher Isherwood have expressed the opinion that Vivekananda has presented an accurate picture of Ramakrishna. Scholar Amiya P. Sen argues that Sil's thesis, "naively overlooks" several factors.

Other biographic works include Mahendranath Dutta's Sri Ramakrishner Anudhyan, ("Sacred Memories of Sri Ramakrishna"), Satyacharan Mitra's 1897 Sri Sri Ramakrsna Paramahamsadeber Jiboni o Upadesh ("The Life and Teachings of Sri Ramakrishna Paramahamsa"), and Sureshchandra Datta's 1886 Sriramakrsnadeber Upades ("Teachings of SriRamakrishna").

Max Müller's book Râmakrishna: His Life and Sayings (1898) is one of the earliest works by a Western scholar on the life of Ramakrishna and, according to Walter Neevel, a relatively independent source of biography. Romain Rolland, writing in 1929, said that this work is based on first-hand evidence, analysed in "broad and clear critical spirit". Max Müller said that he based his book on the testimonies of Swami Vivekananda and several independent witnesses, both favorable and unfavorable to Ramakrishna. Max Müller regarded Ramakrishna as The Real Mahatman.

Romain Rolland's book Life of Ramakrishna (1929) is another biographic work which is based on direct disciples of whom Romain Rolland writes —"I have received glowing testimony at their hands. I have talked with some among them, who were the companions of this mystic being - of the Man-Gods- and I can vouch for their loyalty. Moreover, these eye-witnesses are not the simple fishermen of the Gospel story; some are great thinkers, learned in European thought and disciplined in its strict school.", and independent eyewitnesses of Ramakrishna who were alive at his time. He had consulted the Christian missionaries who had interviewed Ramakrishna.

In 1995, Jeffrey J. Kripal argued in his controversial Kali's Child: The Mystical and the Erotic in the Life and Teachings of Ramakrishna, a psychoanalytic study of Ramakrishna's life, that Ramakrishna's mystical experiences were symptoms of repressed homoeroticism. Kripal also argued in Kali's Child that the Ramakrishna Movement had manipulated Ramakrishna's biographical documents, that the Movement had published them in incomplete and bowdlerised editions (claiming among other things, hiding Ramakrishna's homoerotic tendencies), and that the Movement had suppressed Ram Chandra Datta's Srisriramakrsna Paramahamsadever Jivanavrttanta.

In 2018, Ayon Maharaj, also known as Swami Medhananda, a monk of the Ramakrishna Order, holds a doctorate in philosophy from the University of California, Berkeley, published Infinite Paths to Infinite Reality (Oxford University Press), a book-length philosophical interpretation of Ramakrishna's teachings. Maharaj argues that "Ramakrishna's spiritual standpoint of vijnana holds the key to understanding his nuanced position on religious diversity", and his analysis of Ramakrishna "combines detailed exegesis with cross-cultural philosophical investigation". Pratap Bhanu Mehta characterized Maharaj's book as "philosophically astute [and] textually scrupulous", a work that defends "Ramakrishna against the charge of an indiscriminate eclecticism on the one hand, or a covert hierarchy on the other. He meticulously reconstructs Ramakrishna’s thought around four pillars: the nature of God’s infinitude, the nature of religious pluralism, the epistemology of mystical experience and the problem of evil. In each of these four areas, Maharaj both advances an original interpretive thesis and brings Ramakrishna into a dialogue with comparative philosophy and religious practice."

== Other books ==
- Sri Ramakrishna, the Great Master by Swami Saradananda, Translated by Swami Jagadananda, Sri Ramakrishna Math, Chennai.
- Life of Sri Ramakrishna, compiled from various authentic sources (1925) by Swami Madhavananda is also one of the primary sources of Ramakrishna's biography and contains first hand accounts of his disciples, live witnesses.
- Life of Sri Ramakrishna, Swami Nikhilananda, Foreword by Mahatma Gandhi, Advaita Ashrama, Kolkata.
- Ramakrishna, His Life and Sayings, by Sri Ramakrishna Paramahamsa. ISBN 978-1-60506-646-2
- A Short Life of Sri Ramakrishna, by Swami Tejasananda.
- Words of the Master: Selected Precepts of Sri Ramakrishna by Swami Brahmananda
- Ananyananda, Swami (1981). Ramakrishna: a biography in pictures. Advaita Ashrama, Calcutta. ISBN 978-81-85843-97-1.
- Chetanananda, Swami (1990). Ramakrishna As We Saw Him. St. Louis: Vedanta Society of St Louis. ISBN 978-0-916356-64-4.
- Hourihan, Paul (2002). Ramakrishna & Christ, the Supermystics: New Interpretations. Vedantic Shores Press. ISBN 1-931816-00-X.
- Prosser, Lee. (2001) Isherwood, Bowles, Vedanta, Wicca, and Me. Writers Club: Lincoln, Nebraska. ISBN 0-595-20284-5
- Satyananda, Saraswati (2005). Ramakrishna: The Nectar of Eternal Bliss. Devi Mandir Publications. ISBN 1-877795-66-6.
- Shourie, Arun (2017), Two Saints: Speculations around and about Ramakrishna Paramahamsa and Ramana Maharishi., Harper Collins.
- Torwesten, Hans (1999). Ramakrishna and Christ, or, The paradox of the incarnation. The Ramakrishna Mission Institute of Culture. ISBN 978-81-85843-97-1.
- ŚrīśrīRāmakr̥shṇa janmot̲asaba o abatāra-pūjāra ādiparba / Aruṇa Kumāra Biśvāsa (2003), publisher Kalakātā : Phārmā Ke. Ela. Ema, 2003, On the festivities and celebrations concerning the birth anniversaries of Ramakrishna, 1836–1886, book by Arun Kumar Biswas, ISBN 8171021026]
- Swarup, Ram, (1986). Ramakrishna Mission: In search of a new identity. New Delhi: Voice of India.
- Zaleski, Philip (2006). "The Ecstatic". Prayer: A History. Mariner Books.

== See also ==
- Views on Ramakrishna
- Bibliography of Swami Vivekananda
