= Views on Ramakrishna =

Ramakrishna (1836–1886) was a 19th-century Indian mystic whose teachings form the foundation of the Ramakrishna religious movement, Ramakrishna Order and Ramakrishna Mission.

== Religious views ==
=== Ultimate reality ===
Swami Medhananda, Head of the Department of Philosophy at the Ramakrishna Mission Vivekananda University, who holds a doctorate in philosophy from the University of California, Berkeley, published a book-length philosophical interpretation of Ramakrishna's teachings with the Oxford University Press in 2018. Maharaj argues that "Ramakrishna's spiritual standpoint of vijnana holds the key to understanding his nuanced position on religious diversity", and his analysis of Ramakrishna "combines detailed exegesis with cross-cultural philosophical investigation". Pratap Bhanu Mehta characterized Maharaj's book, Infinite Paths to Infinite Reality, as "philosophically astute [and] textually scrupulous", a work that defends

Ramakrishna against the charge of an indiscriminate eclecticism on the one hand, or a covert hierarchy on the other. He meticulously reconstructs Ramakrishna's thought around four pillars: the nature of God's infinitude, the nature of religious pluralism, the epistemology of mystical experience and the problem of evil. In each of these four areas, Maharaj both advances an original interpretive thesis and brings Ramakrishna into a dialogue with comparative philosophy and religious practice.

=== Christianity ===
At the end of 1873 Ramakrishna started the practice of Christianity, when his devotee Shambu Charan Mallik read the Bible to him. According to Swami Saradananda's biography Sri Ramakrishna, the Great Master, Ramakrishna was filled with Christian thoughts for three days and no longer thought of going to the Kali temple. Ramakrishna described a vision in which a picture of the Madonna and Child became alive, and he had a vision in which Jesus merged with his body. In his own room amongst other divine pictures was one of Christ, and he burnt incense before it morning and evening. There was also a picture showing Jesus Christ saving St Peter from drowning in the water. Ramakrishna regarded Jesus as "the great Yogi". Ramakrishna's teachings and personality have been studied from the point of Christianity by scholars such as Romain Rolland and Paul Hourihan. Another book, Ramakrishna & Christ, the Supermystics: New Interpretations compares the life and spiritual beliefs of Ramakrishna with that of Jesus Christ. Francis X Clooney, a Roman Catholic priest and member of the Society of Jesus, writes that Ramakrishna's vision of Christ, "shows Christians like myself a way to respond to the mystery, beauty and holiness of non-Christian religious experiences". Religious scholar D.S. Sarma and Romain Rolland have noted similarities between Ramakrishna's mystic experiences and other religious personalities—St. Paul, Henry Suso—a German mystic of the 14th century, Richard Rolle of Hampole, and St. Teresa of Avila.

=== Islam ===
Swami Saradananda's biography Sri Ramakrishna, the Great Master says that in 1866, Govinda Roy, a Hindu guru who practised Sufism, initiated Ramakrishna into Islam, and that he practiced Islam for three days. During this practice, Ramakrishna had a vision of a luminous figure, and Swami Nikhilananda's biography of Ramakrishna speculates that the figure was 'perhaps Mohammed'. According to these accounts, Ramakrishna "devoutly repeated the name of Allah, wore a cloth like the Arab Muslims, said their prayer five times daily, and felt disinclined even to see images of the Hindu gods and goddesses, much less worship them—for the Hindu way of thinking had disappeared altogether from my mind." After three days of practice he had a vision of a "radiant personage with grave countenance and white beard resembling the Prophet and merging with his body". According to Kripal, this "would have been a heretical experience through and through" for most Muslims.

Ramakrishna's teachings and experiences have been studied from the perspective of Islam, and compared with teachings of the Sufi saints, by scholars like A. J. A. Tyeb. Tyeb notes that Ramakrishna's sadhana of meditating alone at night in the forest for several days is similar to the 19th century mystic, Sayed Sah Murshid Ali Quaderi. Tyeb writes that Ramakrishna's prayer to the goddess Kali is similar to that of Rabia, who is described as 'a woman who lost herself in union with the Divine'. Tyeb also writes that Al Muhasibi, a 9th-century Sufi of Baghdad, spoke of meditation in the same way as Ramakrishna did. Bhawuk, in his journal, Culture's influence on creativity: the case of Indian spirituality wrote that Ramakrishna's contribution to humanity is significant for the world after the bombing of the World Trade Center on September 11, 2001. Bhawuk writes that Islam is not to be blamed for the September 11 attacks, and no religion should be blamed for any act of terrorism, because the life of Ramakrishna proclaims that all religions lead to the same God.

=== Swami Vivekananda ===
Swami Vivekananda, who would in time become Ramakrishna's most ardent and prominent disciple, initially viewed Ramakrishna's ecstasy as pathological, questioned his qualification of Kali as the "mother of universe", and did not accept him as an avatara. Vivekananda regarded the Advaitist Vedantism of identity with the Absolute as blasphemy and madness. After a period of revolt, Ramakrishna was accepted as a guru.

Referring to the practice of Madhura Bhava, by his guru, in a speech in 1896, My Master, Vivekananda said,

One of the Sâdhanâs was to root out the sex idea. Soul has no sex, it is neither male nor female. It is only in the body that sex exists, and the man who desires to reach the spirit cannot at the same time hold to sex distinctions. Having been born in a masculine body, this man wanted to bring the feminine idea into everything. He began to think that he was a woman, he dressed like a woman, spoke like a woman, gave up the occupations of men, and lived in the household among the women of a good family, until, after years of this discipline, his mind became changed, and he entirely forgot the idea of sex; thus the whole view of life became changed to him.

Referring to the teaching of Kama-Kanchana, Vivekananda said,

Man is a soul, and soul is sexless, neither man nor woman. The idea of sex and the idea of money were the two things, he thought, that prevented him from seeing the Mother. This whole universe is the manifestation of the Mother, and She lives in every woman's body. "Every woman represents the Mother; how can I think of woman in mere sex relation?" That was the idea: Every woman was his Mother, he must bring himself to the state when he would see nothing but Mother in every woman. And he carried it out in his life.

Speaking briefly about Sri Ramakrishna at the end of his talk - 'The Sages of India', he said

There he lived, without any book-learning whatsoever; this great intellect never learnt even to write his own name, but the most graduates of our university found in him an intellectual giant. He was a strange man, this Shri Ramakrishna Paramahamsa. It is a long, long story, and I have no time to tell anything about him tonight. Let me now only mention the great Shri Ramakrishna, the fulfilment of the Indian sages, the sage for the time, one whose teaching is just now, in the present time, most beneficial. And mark the divine power working behind the man. The son of a poor priest, born in an out-of-the-way village, unknown and unthought of, today is worshipped literally by thousands in Europe and America, and tomorrow will be worshipped by thousands more. Who knows the plans of the Lord!

=== Romain Rolland ===
In his book The Life of Ramakrishna (1929), Romain Rolland, argues that Ramakrishna's experiences were not pathological. Rolland also argues the inapplicability of psychoanalysis on Ramakrishna, Swami Vivekananda and other mystics. Rolland had correspondence with Freud. In his letter of 5 December 1927, Rolland indicated that he was researching a book on the Hindu saints Ramakrishna and Vivekananda. The references to Freud and psychoanalysis in these books are considered as direct response to Civilization and Its Discontents.

=== Leo Schneiderman ===
Leo Schneiderman in his work, Ramakrishna: Personality and Social Factors in the Growth of a Religious Movement (1969) argues that Ramakrishna's "bizarre" behaviour (samadhi) must be judged within its proper cultural context. According to Schneiderman, since Ramakrishna was a Brahmin priest who combined the performance of traditional religious functions with demonstrations of divine possession, especially in samādhi, he could appeal to a wide clientele, and he was both an exemplar of Redfield's "great tradition" of Hinduism, and of village shamanism, sublimated to a very high plane. Schneiderman argues that Ramakrishna's trances and other dramatic manifestations, including perhaps, even his psychotic behaviour, were not truly aberrations from the standpoint of the non-Sanskritic popular culture.

=== Walter G. Neevel ===
In the 1976 essay, "The Transformation of Sri Ramakrishna", Walter G. Neevel argues that Ramakrishna's life went through three "transformations". The first—the transformation of the "madman" of the early years to the benign, saintly figure of the later years—appears to have been brought about more by shifting public opinion than personal spiritual progression. According to Neevel, the second and third transformations reflect not historically verifiable ideas or events in the life of the saint but myth-making and misrepresentation, often by his most intimate followers and disciples. Neevel argues that the saint is incorrectly depicted as an advaitin of the Sankarite school.

Amiya Prosad Sen argues that Neevel's essay overlooks certain problems. Neevel does not place the ascriptions of Ramakrishna as an advaitin or vedantin in the historical context of Indian philosophy, as did Western-educated intelligentsia like Ram Mohan Roy. Amiya Sen writes that contrary to what Neevel suggests, "the maddened state of Ramakrishna" during his early practice is described by the Vivekachudamani, an advaitic text as one of the spiritually exalted states. Sen further writes that "Vivekananda derived the social service gospel under direct inspiration from Ramakrishna rests very substantially on the liminal quality of the Master's message". Neevel attributes Ramakrishna's ability to lapse into trance was largely due to his aesthetic and emotional sensitivity.

=== Ramana Maharshi ===
A few of Ramana Maharshi's words regarding Ramakrishna are recorded in the book, Talks with Ramana Maharshi. When asked if Ramakrishna could really have seen Kali's image to be alive, he replied that it was Ramakrishna's 'own vital force which manifested as if it were outside and drew him in.'

=== Psychoanalysis and sexuality ===
Ramakrishna's personality and actions have been a popular topic of psychological analysis by scholars and writers, especially in the Western world. In addition to his mystical experiences, much attention has been paid to his attitudes towards sexuality and the role of sex in his philosophical and religious views. Some of these studies have been extremely controversial.

==== Dr. Jeanne Openshaw ====
In 1995, Dr. Jeanne Openshaw, a senior lecturer in Religious Studies who specializes in the area of Bengali Vaishnavism and Culture, argued that the behaviour or religious practices of Ramakrishna are not necessarily abnormal. Openshaw writes that from the context of devotional Bengali Vaishnavism, where femininity represents the highest attainable condition, the cultivation of femininity by men in various ways is not necessarily abnormal, nor can it be taken as a sign of homosexuality. Openshaw writes that in rural Bengal, male celibacy, and conservation of semen are considered important. Openshaw argues that Ramakrishna's attempt to see all women as mothers rather than as sexual partners, cannot be seen in terms of homoerotic tendencies.

==== Alan Roland ====
Attempts by modern authors to psychoanalyze Ramakrishna were questioned in 1996 by practicing psychoanalyst Alan Roland, who has written extensively about applying Western psychoanalysis to Eastern cultures, and charges that psychoanalysis has been misapplied to Ramakrishna. Roland decries the facile decoding of Hindu symbols, such as Kali's sword and Krishna's flute, into Western sexual metaphors—thereby reducing Ramakrishna's spiritual aspiration to the basest psychopathology. The conflation of Ramakrishna's spiritual ecstasy, or samādhi, with unconscious dissociated states due to repressed homoerotic feelings is not based on common psychoanalytic definitions of these two different motivations, according to Roland. He also writes that it is highly questionable whether Ramakrishna's spiritual aspirations and experiences involve regression—responding to modern attempts to reduce Ramakrishna's spiritual states to a subconscious response to an imagined childhood trauma.

==== Gayatri Chakravorty Spivak ====
Professor Gayatri Chakravorty Spivak, in 1997, took the example of a "dvaita" gaze of a "boy looking up obliquely at the clay and wattle frame of the image of Durga", writing that when we read the photo through Sigmund Freud's psychoanalysis it would be wrongly diagnosed as "double anxiety of castration and decapitation." Spivak writes that Freud's analysis is not culturally receptive and writes that Freud's psychoanalysis is an "occupational hazard". She writes that Ramakrishna was a "Bengali bhakta visionary" and that as a bhakta, he turned chiefly towards Kali.

==== Somnath Bhattacharya ====
Somnath Bhattacharya further elaborates in a 2002 work on considerations related to transvestite and transsexuality traits of Ramakrishna. Bhattacharyya argues that dressing up in feminine attire as part of a legitimate and culturally accepted sadhana for a short period of time does not amount to transvestism, since Ramakrishna also dressed like a Shakta and a Vaishnava during his Shakti and Vaishnava sadhana days, and like a Muslim during his Islam sadhana, which was in male attire. Bhattacharya argues that Ramakrishna's dressing habits were in line with this religious practice. Bhattacharya also argues that Ramakrishna cannot be described as a secondary transsexual. He quotes Ramakrishna's words. "Formerly I too used to see many visions, but now in my ecstatic state I don't see so many. I am gradually getting over my feminine nature; I feel nowadays more like a man. Therefore I control my emotions; I don't manifest it outwardly so much. ..." Bhattacharya writes that the American Psychiatric Association defines transsexuality as a strong and persistent cross-gender identification, and not merely a desire for any perceived cultural advantages of being the other sex; it is a disorder always involving distress to the person, with a feeling of estrangement from the body and a felt need to alter the appearance of the body.

==== J.S. Hawley ====
John Stratton Hawley, Professor of Religion at Barnard College, in his 2004 paper The Damage of Separation: Krishna's Loves and Kali's Child examines the following:

- Is it right to think of the religious and erotic realms as overlapping, particularly when a homosexual dimension is involved.
- Second, if Hindus and Hinduism are the subject, should non-Hindus refrain from speaking?

In this study, J.S. Hawley revisits the Kali's Child debate highlighting one of its central terms — the vyakulata feeling of Ramakrishna. J.S.Hawley argues that "neither the gopis' torment nor Ramakrishna's must be allowed to devolve to a bodily level." Hawley further argues that "communities of people who respond to different sexual orientations should not indiscriminately impose their thoughts on religious communities....Eros is dangerous"

==== Kelley Ann Raab ====
While most of the studies have been conducted from either a primarily psychoanalytic perspective or from the perspective of a devotee, Kelley Ann Raab's 1995 work — Is There Anything Transcendent about Transcendence? A Philosophical and Psychological Study of Sri Ramakrishna, focuses upon Ramakrishna from both a philosophical perspective and a psychoanalytic perspective. The study argues that neither a purely psychological explanation nor a solely philosophical account of his visions is adequate to understand his madness or his godliness, but that together psychology and philosophy can deepen our understanding of Ramakrishna and find a common meeting ground. Raab argues that,

- By philosophical analysis of Ramakrishna's devotional mysticism and tantric underpinnings, his visions and behavior were in keeping with his culture and tradition.
- By psychological analysis of Ramakrishna's behavior, he broke through dualistic thought patterns defining gender, humanity, and God by dressing as and imitating a woman.

==== Sudhir Kakar ====
In 1991, Sudhir Kakar wrote "The Analyst and the Mystic" Gerald James Larson wrote, "Indeed, Sudhir Kakar...indicates that there would be little doubt that from a psychoanalytic point of view Ramakrishna could be diagnosed as a secondary transsexual.... For anyone even casually acquainted with Bengali spirituality and cultural life many of the symbolic visions and fantasies of Ramakrishna, which appear bizarre and even pathological when construed only in isolation or individually, become much less so when one relates the visions and fantasies to nineteenth-century Bengal." Kakar sought a meta-psychological, non-pathological explanation connecting Ramakrishna's mystical realization with creativity. Kakar also argued that culturally relative concepts of eroticism and gender have contributed to the Western difficulty in comprehending Ramakrishna. In 2003, Sudhir Kakar wrote a novel, Ecstasy. According to the author, the characters were modelled on Ramakrishna and Vivekananda.

==== Narasingha Sil ====
In 1991, historian Narasingha Sil wrote Ramakrishna Paramahamsa: A Psychological Profile, an account of Ramakrishna that argues that Ramakrishna's mystical experiences were pathological and originated from alleged childhood sexual trauma. Narasingha Sil links Ramakrishna's teaching of Kamini-Kanchana to traditional rural Bengali misogyny. Sil also says that Ramakrishna made his wife into a deity in order to avoid thinking of her as sexual.

Sil's theory has been disputed as reductive by William B. Parsons, who has called for an increased empathetic dialogue between the classical/adaptive/transformative schools and the mystical traditions for an enhanced understanding of Ramakrishna's life and experiences. Bengali Scholar William Radice wrote that, "Sil has debunked the saint so thoroughly and gleefully that it is hard to see how he will recover, once Sil's book becomes widely known."

==== Jeffrey J. Kripal - Kali's Child ====
===== Mysticism and homo-eroticism =====
In 1995, Jeffrey J. Kripal argued in his controversial Kali's Child: The Mystical and the Erotic in the Life and Teachings of Ramakrishna, a psychoanalytic study of Ramakrishna's life, that Ramakrishna's mystical experiences were symptoms of repressed homoeroticism. Kripal also argued in Kali's Child that the Ramakrishna Movement had manipulated Ramakrishna's biographical documents, that the Movement had published them in incomplete and bowdlerised editions (claiming among other things, hiding Ramakrishna's homoerotic tendencies), and that the Movement had suppressed Ram Chandra Datta's Srisriramakrsna Paramahamsadever Jivanavrttanta.

===== Criticisms =====
These views were disputed by Swami Atmajnanananda, who wrote that Jivanavrttanta had been reprinted nine times in Bengali as of 1995. Other scholars and psychoanalysts, including Alan Roland, Kelly Aan Raab, Somnath Bhattacharyya, J.S. Hawley and Gayatri Chakravorty Spivak argue that Western psychoanalysis of Southeast Asian subjects is unreliable and Ramakrishna's religious practices were in line with Bengali tradition. The application of psychoanalysis has further been disputed by Tyagananda and Vrajaprana as being unreliable in understanding Tantra and interpreting cross-cultural contexts in Interpreting Ramakrishna: Kali's Child Revisited (2010).

In 1997 Swami Atmajnanananda wrote, "Scandals, cover-ups, and other imagined occurrences in the life of Ramakrishna: An examination of Jeffrey Kripal's Kali's child". Swami Tyagananda, known for his tract Kali's Child Revisited—or—Didn't Anyone Check the Documentation distributed at the 2000 American Academy of Religion conference, co-authored Interpreting Ramakrishna: Kali's Child Revisited with Pravrajika Vrajaprana in 2010, which was published by Motilal Banarsidass.

Christopher Isherwood who wrote the book Ramakrishna and his Disciples (1965) said in a late interview,

Ramakrishna was completely simple and guileless. He told people whatever came into his mind, like a child. If he had ever been troubled by homosexual desires, if that had ever been a problem he'd have told everybody about them.(...) His thoughts transcended physical love-making. He saw even the mating of two dogs on the street as an expression of the eternal male-female principle in the universe. I think that is always a sign of great spiritual enlightenment.

In addition, Isherwood wrote in his autobiographical book, My Guru and his Disciple,

I couldn't honestly claim him as a homosexual, even a sublimated one, much as I would have liked to be able to do so.

June McDaniel in Journal of Hindu-Christian Studies wrote,

...to understand other cultures instead of getting into conflicts with them, greater empathy and clearer sight are needed. Perhaps it would be useful to have more academics who are also practitioners, like the authors of this book, who can walk the line between criticism and empathy. Interpreting Ramakrishna brings out some of the best of each side; it mixes the idealism and dedication of a meditative path with the critical scholarship and historical analysis of academia.

===== Interpreting Ramakrishna: Kali's Child Revisited =====
Interpreting Ramakrishna: Kali's Child Revisited is a book authored by Swami Tyagananda and Pravrajika Vrajaprana, published by Motilal Banarsidass in 2010. The foreword of the book was written by religious scholar Huston Smith.

The authors of Interpreting Ramakrishna write that the conclusions arrived at by Kali's Child involve methodological problems including "mistranslation", "speculation" and "misdocumentation and context-tampering". The authors write that the Western academics who accepted the thesis of Kali's Child with positive reviews were "extremely unlikely" to have made a "close or extensive comparison" of the Kathamrita with that of Nikhilananda and Kripal's translations, and that a majority of the reviewers were not Bengali readers. The authors write that "interpreting across cultural, religious and historical distances is always vexed, requiring great sensitivity and an openness to an enormous range of cultural issues and contexts." They write that psychoanalytical interpretations are unreliable to interpret linga/yoni symbolism, Tantra, or Ramakrishna's purported misogyny. The authors also discuss the history of Ramakrishna scholarship from 20th century to the present, dealing with scholars like Max Muller, Romain Rolland, Christopher Isherwood, Malcolm McLean, June McDaniel, Carl Oslon, Narasingha Sil, Jeffery Kripal, Sudhir Kakar and other interpreters.

A panel discussion on Interpreting Ramakrishna was held at the Dharma Academy of North America (DANAM) annual meeting of the American Academy of Religion in October, 2010.

==== Tantra Sadhana ====
Different views on Ramakrishna's tantric sadhana have been expressed. The Tantra sadhana consisted of the "right-handed path" consisting of Kularnava, Mahanirvana and Kamalakala Vilasa involving celibate vegetarian lifestyle, japa, breath control, concentration, meditation and a set of heterodox practices which include but are not limited to the Vamachara—termed as "left-handed path", which involves drinking wine, eating meat, and sexual intercourse. Depending on an aspirant's disposition, Tantra prescribes a particular method for spiritual practice. In general, the Tantras classify people into three major groups pasu (animal), vira (hero), divya (godlike). According to Saradananda, Ramakrishna was in the vira stage during the practice of vamachara. Elizabeth U. Harding writes that the Tantra practices are aimed at rousing the Kundalini and piercing the six chakras. Harding argues that Tantra is one of the paths for God-realization and cannot be branded as sensualism.

Christopher Isherwood writes that the object of the tantrik disciplines is "to see, behind all phenomena, the presence of God and to overcome the obstacles to this insight — attraction and aversion". Further Isherwood argues that words which normally carry sensual associations suggested higher meanings to Ramakrishna in his exalted state. For example, the word yoni, which normally means the female sex-organ, would mean for him the divine source of creation. According to Isherwood, for Ramakrishna the most unconditionally obscene words were sacred to him as the vocabulary of the scriptures during the tantra sadhana. Religious scholars note that the word linga represented purusha, and yoni represented prakriti.

Neevel argues that some of Ramakrishna's followers tend to be apologetic about his taking up tantric practices because of the eroticism that has discredited tantric schools in general and those of Bengal in particular. Neevel argues that the influence of tantra on this spiritual development is underestimated. Ramchandra Datta one of the early biographers of Ramakrishna is reported to have said, "We have heard many tales of the Brahmani but we hesitate to divulge them to the public."

In Kali's Child, Jeffery Kripal argues that "Ramakrishna's world, then, was a Tantric world". Kripal further argues that Ramakrishna's Tantric practices were "omnipresent, defining virtually every point along Ramakrishna's spiritual development." Amiya P. Sen writes that "it is really difficult to separate the Tantrik Ramakrishna from the Vedantic", since Vedanta and Tantra "may appear to be differ in some respects", but they also "share some important postulates between them".
