= Kali's Child =

1995 book by Jeffrey J. Kripal

Kali's Child: The Mystical and the Erotic in the Life and Teachings of Ramakrishna
- Author: Jeffrey J. Kripal
- Language: English
- Subject: Hindu studies
- Publisher: University of Chicago Press
- Publication date: 1995
- Publication place: United States
- Media type: Print (Hardback & Paperback)

Kali's Child: The Mystical and the Erotic in the Life and Teachings of Ramakrishna is a book on the Indian mystic Ramakrishna by Hindu studies scholar Jeffrey J. Kripal, published in 1995 by the University of Chicago press. It argues for a homoerotic strain in Ramakrishna's life, rituals, and teachings.

The book won the American Academy of Religion's History of Religions Prize for the Best First Book of 1995. It has been criticised by Ramakrishna's followers and several scholars, and became the object of an intense controversy among both Western and Indian audiences. Critics have argued that the book's conclusions were arrived at through mistranslation of Bengali, misunderstanding of tantra, and misuse of psychoanalysis. Two attempts have been made to have the book banned in India, in 1996 and 2001, but did not pass in the Parliament. Kripal published a second edition in 1998 and several essays and rebuttals, to which critics have also responded.

The book was developed from Kripal's Ph.D. dissertation on Ramakrishna at the University of Chicago, advised by Wendy Doniger. According to Kripal, he adopted a Freudian approach to uncover the connections between tantric and psychoanalytic hermeneutical traditions. In the preface, Kripal writes that he was fascinated and interested in the relation between "human sexuality and mystical experience". He also mentions that Kali's Child was influenced by Wendy Doniger whose, "voluminous work, both in its rhetoric style and its erotic content provided me with a scholarly context, a genre if you will, in which I could write and defend my own ideas."

The primary thesis of Kali's Child is that a Ramakrishna's mystical experiences were generated by the lingering results of childhood traumas, and sublimated homoerotic and pedophiliac passions; and that "Ramakrishna's mystical experiences...were in actual fact profoundly, provocatively, scandalously erotic." Kripal has argued that the same view was expressed 12 years earlier by Malcolm McLean, in his English translation of the Kathamrita.

Kripal examines a series of remarks made by Ramakrishna to some of his intimate disciples regarding his mystical experiences and visions which, following Ramakrishna, he calls "secret talks" (guhya katha). Kripal argues that Ramakrishna's attitudes and orientations were well known to some of his contemporaries (though not to Ramakrishna himself) and were hidden and suppressed, initially by his own disciples and later by members of the Ramakrishna Order. He argues a systematic whitewashing of details and a general cover-up carried out by the biographers and translators of Ramakrishna.

== Reviews and reaction ==
=== Scholarly reviews, 1995–1997 ===
The book won the American Academy of Religion's History of Religions Prize for the Best First Book of 1995. In the following years, the book was reviewed in several Western academic journals of religion and South Asian culture. In 1999, the Bengali scholar Brian Hatcher wrote that while several reviewers expressed some misgivings, their overall evaluation of Kali's Child was positive, and at times highly laudatory, including one in 1997 by Malcolm McLean, a scholar of Bengali literature who has translated the Sri-Sri-Ramakrishna-Kathamrta and the poetry of Ramprasad. Hatcher cited a sample Bengali text from the Kathāmṛta in his own article, arguing that Kripal accurately translated the passage in a way that Swami Nikhilananda's translation did not.

On the other hand, in 1995 Cambridge scholar Jean Openshaw criticized Kripal's book for what she saw as "sleight of hand by which strained or confessedly speculative arguments are subsequently transformed into a firm base for further such arguments". She also faulted the book for "slippage between an entirely appropriate scepticism towards the sources, and an unthinking acceptance of them when it suits the argument". In her opinion, Ramakrishna could not be regarded as a misogynist. She found Kripal's familiarity with a variety of Bengali texts "impressive", but noted several translation slips. For example, Kripal wrote that the faith of an associate of Ramakrishna had "homoerotic dimensions" on the grounds that he "liked to look at pictures of men, for they aroused in him feelings of 'tenderness' and 'love'". Openshaw wrote that the word manus which Kripal had translated as "men" actually means "human being" without gender specificity. She also noted that Kripal had taken "body" (ga- or an+ga) and "lap" (kol) to mean "genitals" and "a normally defiled sexual space", whereas in Bengali culture the lap has a strong maternal association. In her view, Kripal had fallen "into a reductionist trap by sexualising his language in a way quite inappropriate to the material." She wrote that Kripal's disclaimer "certainly many of my conclusions are speculative", but did not agree with his statement that "taken together their combined weight adds up to a convincing argument".

Rajat Kanta Ray, a Bengali scholar in his 1997 review wrote that the historical evidence Kripal offers in favour of Ramakrishna's homosexuality is "shaky" and some of Kripal's own evidence "seems to contradict it, and opens up the possibility of an alternative interpretation. A number of his translations from the primary text-Ramakrishna Kathamrita-are wrong; his psychoanalytical proceedings with the text, without the verifications psychoanalysts derive from patients under the ’free-association method’, fills me with doubt, especially as regards his identifications of some Tantrik symbols." Ray writes that "here and there" in the Kathamrita, he comes across "evidence which does not fit", and which ought to have made Kripal "rethink his formulations."

In his 1997 review, Bhaskar Mukhopadhyay of Goldsmiths, University of London begins by describing Kali's Child's as an "invigorating read" and an "iconoclastic thesis ... supported by solid textual scholarship". Despite this initial impression, Mukhopadhyay found Kirpals's method of 'reading' Ramakrishna's life to be problematic. Mukhopadhyay criticizes Kripal's method of "sexualisation" of Ramakrishna's body and writes that Kripal does not take culture into consideration. Mukhopadhyay writes, "I demand that Ramakrishna's visions be taken at their face value and not interpreted as some kind of a confused expression of his sexuality." Criticizing the "obvious glee in Kripal's tone which sometimes verges on flippancy", Mukhopadhyay continues, "Ramakrishna is a very serious matter and real theoretical sophistication is needed to deal with this enigmatic character. With his pop psychoanalysis, bop prose and a crude sense of humour, Kripal is nowhere near those serious scholars...". Towards the end, he writes that the book has "enough nuisance value to perturb those who are at the helm of affairs at Ramakrishna Mission."

In 1997, Gerald Larson of Indiana University wrote that Kripal's book lacked balance and proper contextualization, and considered that it fell into the trap of monocausal reductionism. In his opinion, the book would have been much more balanced if Kripal had sought a review outside the context of his teachers and colleagues, including the Swamis of the Ramakrishna Mission (but not allow them to censor) and professionals within the psychoanalytic community. Larson attributed the problem of reductionism to the attitude pervading the American Academy of Religion on the relation between modern secular intellectuals and believing communities. He wrote that psychoanalytic interpretations are "exceedingly problematic even with the extensive and current evidence of daily psychoanalytic therapy" and that psychoanalysts would be very cautious about asserting relationships between sexual fantasies and mystical or religious experience. On the whole, Larson argued that Kripal's thesis, of "Ramakrishna's homosexual tendencies" having determined the manner in which he created his self-defined states, was "thoroughly implausible" and that a psychoanalyst would be unlikely to say that Ramakrishna's "homoerotic energies" were his mysticism. Larson wrote that the evidence presented in the book did not support "a cause-effect relation between the erotic and the mystical (or the religious), much less an identity".

In a 1997 review, Pravrajika Vrajaprana discussed Kripal reliance on unreliable sources, such as a report of "a particularly bizarre method Ramakrishna supposedly used to control lust", which Kripal at one point "doubt[ed] seriously" the incident ever occurred, but which he later used to confirm his conclusion.

William Radice wrote in early 1998 that "[Ramakrishna's] homosexual leanings and his horror of women as lovers should not be the issue: there was plenty of evidence before the exposure of the guhya katha ["secret talk"]. Radice compared the book to a majar kuti ("mansion of fun"), wrote that "occasionally one stops to ask if one has not been hoodwinked by the charm of [Kripal's] arguments", and wondered whether the book could be a game "no more playful than Ramakrishna's own earthy banter".

Reviewer Hugh Urban criticized Kripal for ignoring the social and historical context of late nineteenth-century Bengal. Urban also criticized Kripal for what he saw as a "tendency toward sensationalism and at times an almost journalistic delight in playing on the "sexy," "seedy," "scandalous," and shocking nature of his material".

=== Sil's 1997 review ===
Controversy over the book left the bounds of academia in January 1997, when The Statesman, Calcutta's leading English-language newspaper, published a full-page review of the book by historian Narasingha Sil (whom Kripal had thanked in the preface of Kali's Child) that ended with the words "plain shit". Sil himself had previously written a psychoanalytic study of Ramakrishna, which suggested that Ramakrishna's mystical experiences were pathological and originated from alleged childhood sexual trauma. According to Hugh Urban, Sil's Statesman review of Kali's Child presented Kripal as "a shoddy scholar with a perverse imagination who has thoughtlessly 'ransacked' another culture". The Asian Age also published a negative review by its editor, Tapti Roy, in the same year.

In a 1997 letter to a Ramakrishna Mission official (published in 2001), Narasingha Sil added a negative view of Kripal's scholarship and proficiency in the Bengali. Sil argued that Kripal translated Bengali terms through Bengali-English dictionaries by picking the meanings that would be most appropriate to make his point, disregarding the primary, secondary, tertiary meanings. He also argued that Kripal was unable even to converse in Bengali. In another 1997 article, Sil charged Kripal with "willful distortion and manipulation of sources", and with, while criticising Swami Nikhilananda's translation of the Kathamrita, having "committed similar crime[s] of omission and commission to suit his thesis."

Sil's review in the Statesman provoked a flurry of angry letters to the editors. The daily published 38 of them and then decided to close the issue, apparently an unprecedented decision in the newspaper's history. Kripal wrote that Willian Radice twice tried to publish a defence of the book in the Statesman, but the editors refused to do so. Kripal soon found himself and the book embroiled in a long-running dispute. Censoring the book was even debated (unsuccessfully) in the Parliament of India. Kripal claimed, however, that less than 100 copies had been sold in India and only a few thousands in the US; and that few of its "opponents" had actually read the book.

=== Atmajnanananda's criticisms, 1997 ===
A critical review of Kripal's book was published in 1997 by Ramakrishna Mission's Swami Atmajnanananda. He argued that Kripal's book contained many translation and interpretation errors, such as translating māgi as "bitch" instead of "woman". Atmajnananda argued that Kripal had mis-interpreted many of the passages that he had cited, sometimes interpolating words in the translation that were not present in the original. He wrote, for example, that Krishna's traditional depiction in Hindu iconography, the tribhanga pose, "bent in three places" (i.e., bent at the knee, waist and elbow, with flute in hand) which is sacred to Hindus, had been translated by Kripal as cocked hips. He wrote that Kripal's thesis was "nothing more than smoke and mirrors, a house of cards which collapses at the merest touch".

Atmajnananda also disputed Kripal's arguments of concealment of sources by the Ramakrishna Order.

=== Second edition, 1998 ===
Kripal published a second edition of Kali's Child in 1998. In its preface he claimed to have corrected the translation errors pointed out by Atmajnananda. Kripal called the corrections "a set of minor errors" which he "happily corrected", since they did not contradict his main thesis.

=== Kripal's response to Larson, 1998 and Larson's rejoinder ===
In a 1998 response to Gerald Larson's review, Kripal denied the critic's claims that his final conclusions were monocausally reductive, saying that Larson had seriously misunderstood him, as in Kali's Child he had adopted a "nondual methodology" and expressed "consistent rejection of Freudian reductionism". Kripal argued that Larson lifted a few lines out of context to show that Kripal's concluding analysis was a "reductionistic reading". for Larson's suggestion that he should have "vetted" the text to the Ramakrishna Mission before publishing it, Kripal cited Christopher Isherwood, who wrote in 1981 that "there were limits" to what he could say in Ramakrishna and His Disciples once the book became a project of the Order. Kripal wrote about other similar incidents and argued to have avoided submitting is book to the Mission in order to protect his own intellectual freedom. Kripal argued that if he had done so, he "indeed would not, could not, have written [Kali's Child], but not because of some idealized balance" but because he "would have been too afraid".

In a rejoinder Larson added that by "vetting", he did not mean any sort of "public" debate or confrontation. Larson maintained that reductionism would have been avoided if Kripal has selected one or two Swamis within the Ramakrishna order and one or two practising psychoanalysts for some "critical feedback" prior to the publication of the manuscript and they would have alerted him to the "serious problems of lack of balance and reductionism that are readily apparent in his 'Conclusion: Analyzing the Secret.'" Larson also disagreed with Kripal that he had lifted a few lines out of context to indicate "reductionistic reading", wrote that he "invite[d] any reader to read the book's conclusion in order to determine whether the final analysis is reductionist or not", and argued that the conclusions were "doubly reductionist."

=== Tyagananda and Vrajaprana, 2000 and 2010 ===
In 2000, Swami Tyagananda, minister of the Ramakrishna-Vedanta Society in Boston and a Hindu chaplain at both Harvard University and MIT, produced a tract entitled “Kali's Child Revisited or Didn't Anyone Check the Documentation,” which was distributed at the 2000 annual meeting of AAR and later published in journal Evam. In the long, meticulously argued tract, Tyagananda questioned Kripal's linguistic competence of the Bengali language on which the thesis was built and argued that Kripal had distorted the meaning of passages throughout the Kathamrita. Tyagananda also argued about other alleged errors by Kripal. For example, Kripal had called "boy" a devotee Kedar who, according to Tyaganada, was actually a fifty-year-old accountant; "boy of fifteen" a person of thirty-four or thirty-five years; and "boy disciples" a group of people in their forties. He asserted that Kripal's claims of child eroticism had been built on these mistranslations.

In 2010, Swami Tyagananda and Pravrajika Vrajaprana wrote Interpreting Ramakrishna: Kali's Child Revisited. In this book, the authors argued with cross-references to the source texts that Kripal had a "piecemeal" knowledge of the Bengali language and lack of understanding of the Bengali culture, which led him to misinterpret the texts and fabricate a Ramakrishna conforming to his own "feels like" factor rather than a historical figure preserved well through honest documentation. They disputed positive reviews by Western academics writing that the "great majority of those who accepted the latter thesis were not in a position to assess the translation since most of the reviewers were not Bengali readers." They wrote that its "extremely unlikely" that any reviewer did a "close or extensive comparison" of the Kathamrita with that of Nikhilananda and Kripal's translations.

=== Kripal's reply to Tyagananda, 2000–2002 ===
Responding to Swami Tyagananda's Kali's Child Revisited, Kripal wrote:

"I read with a mixture of embarrassment, sadness, and hope Swami Tyagananda’s Kali’s Child Revisited. I will pretend no full response here. That can only come with a third edition of the book, for which there are no immediate plans. Until such an opportunity arises, however, I can say that I am eager to resolve these issues in a friendly and open-hearted spirit that can be as faithful as possible both to academic standards of free inquiry and intellectual honesty and to the felt needs of significant segments of the Hindu community, whose religious sensibilities I am all too painfully aware I have offended."

Kripal complained that Tyagananda's questioning of his personal motives for writing the book turned the critique into an ad hominem attack, and denied Tyagananda's charges of "willful distortion and manipulation of sources" and "purposefully deceitful use of citations." He wrote to "deeply regret" the fact that his book has offended many Hindus, but claimed that this fact says nothing about the historical Ramakrishna, "just as the offended responses of innumerable pious Christians [to academic investigations of Jesus] tell us absolutely nothing about the historical Jesus". He also denied having any negative attitude about homosexuality or Ramakrishna, and suggested that Tyagananda's reading of his book "as an ill-intentioned condemnation of Ramakrishna" was not shared by "numerous reviewers and readers (with Hindus among them)". He argued that he had never called Ramakrishna "a homosexual" and "never argued something as simplistic as that Ramakrishna 'sexually abused children' or that he was a 'pederast'", and that "these are other people's words" but not his. He also charged Tyagananda with misquoting his words (such as claiming that Kripal had used "sodomy" when he in fact had not) and argued that he had omitting from his own citations of the Kathamrita parts that would support Kripal's thesis.

As for the alleged translation errors, Kripal argued that he had corrected many of them in the second edition, acknowledged that others still needed to be corrected (such as those about the ages of some persons) and that he would "be happy to make any appropriate corrections in any future printings". He denied that any of those errors had been intentional, and argued that all of them could be easily corrected without altering the substance or conclusions of the book, as they amounted to a very small part of the material he had used to demonstrate his thesis. On the other hand, he argued that many of them were not "errors" but simply different interpretations, and that he still stood by them. He counter-charged Tyagananda and other critics with "textual literalism" by sticking only with the primary meanings of words like uddipana, tribhanga, tana, vyakulata, rati, and ramana, not recognizing their alternate meanings; so that his was not "mistranslation" but rather "good translation". Additionally, Kripal argued (following modern literary theory) that all interpretations, his own included, are products of the interaction of the reader's horizon of understanding with that of the author's.

Concerning the charge that he does not understand Tantra, he argued that Tyagananda's version of Tantra is the "right-handed" ascetic path, as expounded by neo-Vedanta, while the Tantra of Ramakrishna's milieu was the "left-handed" path, which integrates the sexual with the spiritual. In the second edition of Kali's Child, Kripal argued that the "philosophical expositions" of Tantra are inauthentic that are "designed to rid Tantra of everything that smacked of superstition, magic, or scandal".

=== Further reviews ===
In 2001, Huston Smith wrote in a letter to the editor of the Harvard Divinity School Bulletin that, "I doubt that any other book—not even those of early, polemical, poorly informed, and bigoted missionaries — has offended Hindu sensibilities so grossly. And understandably, despite Kripal's protestations to the contrary in Secret Talk: The Politics of Scholarship in Hindu Tantrism, Kali's Child is colonialism updated."

In 2002, religious scholar Peter Heehs wrote that there is no direct evidence of homosexuality in the Kathamrta or "anywhere else", and Kripal himself admits that his interpretations are often "speculative". Heehs wrote that the "sensationalism" of Kripal's approach "vitiates the overall value of his book", which does "make a number of interesting points".

In her 2001 review, Renuka Sharma of Melbourne University and a psychoanalyst disputed Kali's Child as being built upon "veneer of psychoanalysis and symbolic deconstruction....The imperialistic use of some outdated dogmas of psychoanalysis..." She writes that psychoanalysis employed by Kripal is "doubtful ... as a science".

In 2004, John Hawley revised his initial positive evaluation of Kali's Child, and wrote in his study The Damage of Separation that neither the gopis’ torment nor Ramakrishna's must be allowed to devolve to a bodily level. He also argued that communities of people who respond to different sexual orientations should not indiscriminately impose their thoughts on religious communities.

Somnath Bhattacharyya argued that Ramakrishna cannot be regarded as a misogynist, since he spoke about "indriya sukha (sense pleasures), deha sukha (bodily pleasures), vishaya sukha (object gratification), kama (lust), and bhoga (enjoyment) as impediments to spiritual growth" and not because of fear of women. Bhattacharyya also argues that Ramakrishna's lifelong love and devotion for the Goddess Kali does not fit into the homoerotic thesis.

In their 2007 book Invading the Sacred, Krishnan Ramaswamy and Antonio de Nicolas, argued that the American Academy of Religion does not have a well-informed understanding of Hinduism. Ramaswamy and de Nicolas argue that translation errors continued into the second edition of Kali's Child. They argued that instead of winning a prize, Kripal's book should have been reviewed as a possible violation of academic due process and ethical norms.

== Specific criticisms ==
=== Translation and interpretation ===
The main faults that critics have argued in Kali's Child are:

- faulty translations due to a lack of understanding of Bengali language and culture
- willful distortion and manipulation of sources and suppressing the facts
- misunderstanding of tantra
- misuses of psychoanalysis and hermeneutics, and
- false accusations of source suppression by the Ramakrishna Mission.

The alleged translation errors include:

- vyakulata or vyaakula, which means "anxiety" from the context, was translated by Kripal as "erotic torment". J. S. Hawley wrote that the Ramakrishna vyakulata must not "be allowed to devolve to a bodily level that could be indiscriminately shared".
- uddipana, which means "enkindling" or "lighting up" was translated as "homoerotic excitement", and thus translating a sentence that meant "looking at pictures of sadhus" into "getting erotically aroused by looking at picture of holy men".
- Vrindavana lila, "the play in Vrindavan" was translated as "Krishna's sexual exploits with the milkmaids."
- hrt-padma, which means "lotus of the heart", was translated as "vagina".
- raman karo was translated as "have sex" instead of "unite", so what should have been "Unite with Satchidananda" became "Have sex with Saccidananda".
- milan, commonly used to mean "meeting", was translated as "sexual union".

Critics have argued that several instances where Kripal allegedly had misquotes or misinterpretations:

- Adding phrases such as "his near naked body" and "instead of lusting after woman", which did not exist in the original Bengali sources.
- Representing Ramakrishna's teachers Bhairavi Brahmini, Totapuri, and the temple manager Mathur babu as his sexual predators, without evidence.

Gayatri Spivak argued that Kripal has misinterpreted "Ramakrishna's life as a bhakta, as tantric practice" and "unfortunately the book is so full of cultural and linguistic mis-translations that the general premise cannot be taken seriously."

In his 2000 extensive review, Swami Tyagananda argued that Kripal had misquoted Ramakrishna's disciple Christopher Isherwood as confirming the master's homosexuality, when Isherwood had said in fact said that he "couldn't honestly claim him [Ramakrishna] as a homosexual, even a sublimated one", even though he "would have liked to be able to do so." According to Tyagananda, Sarkar's statement that Tantric worship (upasana) is "looking upon a woman as mother" (janani ramani) was misquoted by Kripal to mean the opposite, that the mother is the lover.

=== Tantra ===
Several critics — including Tyagananda, Sil, Urban, and Radice — argue that Kripal misrepresents Tantra to support the thesis. In a 1997 article, Sil wrote that Kripal had tried "to fit the square peg of a Tantrika Ramakrishna into the round hole of a homosexual Paramahamsa". Urban argued that Kripal has a prejudiced view of Tantra as "something scandalous, seedy, sexy, and dangerous". Tyagananda argues that Kripal dismisses the "philosophical expositions" of Tantra as inauthentic, to support his thesis. Tyagananda argued that the Kripal's view that Ramakrishna's world was a "Tantric world" overlooks other religious practices undertook by Ramakrishna, such as Vaishnava, Shakti, Vedanta, Islamism and the Christianity. Radice wrote that erotic-Tantric lens is not the only one through which the Kathamrta can be read." Amiya Prosad Sen writes about Kripal's "confusion" over chronology. Sen writes that arguments made by Kripal that some of Ramakrishna's mystic visions are but subconscious revelations of his actual Tantric experiences with Bhairavi are chronologically not possible. For instance Ramakrishna's vision describing a probing human tongue exploring—what Kripal translates as—"vagina shaped lotuses" as alleged sexual encounter with Bahiravi. Sen writes that this vision (around 1855–1858) was before his first meeting of Bhairavi (1861).

=== Nature of the "secret talk" ===
Kripal labeled some of Ramakrishna's words "secret talk" and believed them to be "too troubling or important to reveal to any but [Ramakrishna's] most intimate disciples"

Several critics, including Tyagananda, Openshaw, Larson, and Radice object to Kripal use of the word secret, which did not exist in the original source. In a 1997 review, Colin Robinson noted that the texts "exposed" by Kripal had been readily available in Bengali since 1932, when the final volume of the Kathamrita was published; and that Kripal used the thirty-first edition of the Kathamrita (1987).

Openshaw argued that it was highly unlikely that any act considered "homosexual" would have been defended by the disciples (homosexuality was rigorously repressed in Indian society of the time), let alone immortalised in print by a devotee.

Larson wrote that "Even Freud, with all of his reductionist tendencies, would have been highly suspicious and critical" about Mahendranath Gupta's so-called "secret" material, if for no other reasons than the temporal distance between his notes and the publication of the Kathamrita.

Radice wrote of the discrepancy between the small amount of "secret talk" cited by Kripal (18 occurrences) and the amount of analysis he derived from them, and asked "Has Kripal made a mountain out of molehill?" He then quoted Kripal's claim that those passages, plus other non-"secret" passages that touch on similar themes, are the key to Ramakrishna's mysticism and a lens through which one can validly read the whole Kathamrta.

In his extensive 2000 review, Tyagananda wrote that Ramakrishna's "secret" talks were neither troubling nor secret, having been said in the presence of a large number of visitors, with the doors open. According to Tyagananda, Kripal's "secret talks" is a mistranslation of guhya katha, which in the context means the "esoteric" or "deeper meaning" of a scripture.

=== Psychoanalysis and hermeneutics ===
Kripal's understanding and application of psychological theory has been criticized by several experts, such as psychoanalyst Alan Roland, author of books and articles on applying psychoanalysis to eastern cultures, Somnath Bhattacharyya (emeritus professor and former head of the Psychology Department at Calcutta University), and Gerald Larson argued that neither Kripal nor his advisor Wendy Doniger were trained as psychologists and in psychoanalysis. These critics observe that neither Kripal nor Wendy Doniger are trained in psychoanalysis or psychology.

Roland argued that Freudian approaches are not applicable to Asian cultures. Other critics questioned the propriety of applying Freudian analysis to third parties via native informants or posthumously.

=== Claims about hiding of sources ===
In the 1995 edition of the book, Kripal argued that the Ramakrishna Mission was hiding or "bowdlerizing" key biographical sources on Ramakrishna, in order to hide inconvenient secrets. These views were denied by the Mission, and some of them were retracted by Kripal shortly thereafter.

==== The Kathamrita ====
According to Kripal, the unusual five-volume, non-chronological structure of Mahendranath Gupta's Kathamrita was designed to "conceal a secret", and Gupta "held back" the secret in the first volume, "hinted at" it in the second, "toyed with" it in the third, "revealed it" in the fourth and found that he had hardly any material left for the fifth.

However, Tyagananda wrote that portions from Gupta's diaries (which are in the possession of his descendants) were published in various Bengali journals long before they appeared in book form as the Kathamrita. According to Tyagananda, there was no textual evidence that Gupta was thinking of writing a book when he began writing his diaries. He pointed out that at least four generations of Bengalis had read the Kathamrita, and he wrote that their perception of Ramakrishna was in most respects diametrically opposite to the picture presented in Kali's Child. Furthermore, Tyagananda wrote that Ramakrishna Mission had published a two-volume edition of the Kathamrita rearranged in chronological order, after the copyright which rested with Gupta's descendants expired.

Disputing the idea that Mahendranath Gupta ran out of material, Amiya Prosad Sen writes that the fifth volume (published posthumously) had "no note of finality" and ended "abruptly". Amiya Sen writes that "M." was contemplating at least six to seven volumes and after which he hoped to rearrange the entire material chronologically, within a single volume. Sen further writes that maintaining a "strictly chronological order" have meant postponing publication, and alternatively Gupta "sacrificed" chronological order to accommodate the short notice period. Sen also writes that Gupta faced other practical problems like finding a willing publisher.

==== The Gospel of Sri Ramakrishna ====
In his book, Kripal also wrote that Swami Nikhilananda's The Gospel of Sri Ramakrishna, which purports to be "a literal translation" of the Kathamrita, contains in fact substantial alterations from Gupta's text. Besides combining the five parallel narratives into a single volume (which is often sold as a two-volume set), Nikhilananda would also have deleted some passages ("only a few pages") which supposedly were "of no particular interest to English-speaking readers".

Examples of missing passages quoted by Kripal include a declaration of Ramakrishna to a disciple: "In that state [during a Tantric ritual with a female guru] I couldn't help but worship the little penises [dhan] of boys with flowers and sandal-paste". Another example was the description by Ramakrishna of one of his visions, which in the Bengali original, according to Kripal, read "This is very secret talk! I saw a boy of twenty-three exactly like me, going up the subtle channel, erotically playing [ramana kara] with the vagina-shaped [yoni-rupa] lotuses with his tongue! but was translated by Nikhilananda as "[...] communing with lotuses with his tongue".

In his 1997 review, Swami Atmajnanananda wrote that "there are some other instances which, at first, seem to substantiate Kripal's cover-up theory" but he too believed that they were all motivated by respect the Western decorum. He argued that, had Nikhilananda been fearful of revealing hidden secrets, "he certainly would have eliminated far more of Ramakrishna's remarks than he did". Atmajnanananda also argued that Kripal's translation of the missing parts was more misleading than Nikhilananda's omissions. In 2000, Swami Tyagananda added that Nikhilananda had attempted to faithfully convey the ideas, which might have been misunderstood if he had opted for a literal translation; and that the Gospel was translated in the 1940s and one should consider the Western sense of decorum as it existed then. Somnath Bhattacharya wrote that anybody with knowledge of Bengali could check that an overwhelming majority of the passages marked guhya-katha had been translated by Nikhilananda faithfully to the letter as well as to the spirit of the original.

==== Jivanvrittanta ====
Kripal also described the book Sri Sri Ramakrishna Paramahamsadever Jivanvrittanta by Ramchandra Dutta as a scandalous biography of Ramakrishna that was suppressed by Ramakrishna's followers.

In response, Pravrajika Vrajaprana and Swami Atmajnanananda wrote that the book had been published in nine Bengali editions as of 1995. In 1998 Kripal wrote that he had "overplayed the degree" of his alleged suppression, noting that "to my wonder (and embarrassment), the Ramakrishna Order reprinted Datta's text the very same summer Kali's Child appeared, rendering my original claims of a conscious concealment untenable."

== Kripal's responses ==
=== To Malhotra ===
Kripal also wrote a long response to Rajiv Malhotra's essay RISA LILA—I:Wendy's Child Syndrome which argued that the Freudian psychoanalytical approach had been discredited even among Western psychologists. Kripal lamented the "angry tone and ad hominem nature" of the text, and charged Rajiv of spreading "a number of falsehoods" over the internet that involved his person and reputation, and of having got "just about everything wrong" about his ideas and translations, claiming that his criticisms were merely a repeat of Tyagananda's.

=== Final remarks ===
By late 2002, Kripal combined his primary replies on his website, and wrote:

"But there comes a time when it is time to move on. After eight years of almost constant thinking, eight published essays, a second monograph, and literally thousands of paper and virtual letters, that time has arrived for me. Accordingly, I plan no future formal responses and have long since moved on to other intellectual projects and topics."

Kripal argued that sexuality and spirituality are intricately linked, and that the history of mysticism in all the world's religions is erotic. Kripal argued that the mysticism of Teresa of Ávila, John of the Cross and other European Roman Catholics were erotic and similar to Ramakrishna's ecstasy. Kripal strongly denied that Kali's Child was intended as a slur either against Ramakrishna specifically or Hinduism in general. Kripal later published his second book, Roads of Excess, Palaces of Wisdom which studied the alleged eroticism in Western mysticism.

== See also ==
- Analytical psychology
