= William B. Parsons =

William B. Parsons may refer to:

- William Barclay Parsons (1859-1932), US civil engineer
- William B. Parsons, author of The Enigma of the Oceanic Feeling: Revisioning the Psychoanalytic Theory of Mysticism on the subject of Views on Ramakrishna
