= Infinite Paths to Infinite Reality =

2018 book by Ayon Maharaj, also known as Swami Medhananda

- Cover of 2018 edition
- Author: Ayon Maharaj, also known as Swami Medhananda
- Language: English
- Genre: philosophy
- Publisher: Oxford University Press
- Publication date: 2018 (US/UK), 2019 (India)
- ISBN: 9780190868239
- OCLC: 1079877496

Infinite Paths to Infinite Reality: Sri Ramakrishna & Cross-Cultural Philosophy of Religion is a book by Ayon Maharaj, also known as Swami Medhananda on Sri Ramakrishna and the philosophy of religion. The book was published in the US and UK in 2018 in hardcover. An Indian hardcover edition was published in 2019. The book has been reviewed in professional and popular journals, and in 2021 was the focus of a fourteen-article book symposium in the International Journal of Hindu Studies.

The book's author holds a doctorate in philosophy from the University of California, Berkeley. At the time of the book's original publication, the author was known as Ayon Maharaj, was a professor at Ramakrishna Mission Vivekananda University, and was a monk-in-training. He subsequently became a fully ordained monk with the name Swami Medhananda. He explained in his 2021 book symposium reply that "Prior to 2010, I published under my premonastic name 'Ayon Roy.' Since joining the Ramakrishna Order in 2010, I have published under the name 'Ayon Maharaj.' In February 2020, I was ordained into Sannyāsa and given the name 'Swami Medhananda,' so I am now publishing under my new name."

== Topics covered ==
Infinite Paths contains four major parts, each containing two chapters, giving a total of eight chapters.

In Infinite Paths, Maharaj argues that "Ramakrishna's spiritual standpoint of vijnana holds the key to understanding his nuanced position on religious diversity".

== Reception ==
Reviews have appeared in Philosophy East and West, Notre Dame Philosophical Reviews, The Indian Express, and Reading Religion, and the Journal of Hindu-Christian Studies. The book is the focus of a book review symposium published in the International Journal of Hindu Studies (2021, volume 25, pp. 55-164), that included thirteen scholarly commentaries on Infinite Paths, followed by a reply from the book's author (Swami Medhananda, formerly Ayon Maharaj).

In Philosophy East and West, religious studies scholar Jeffery D. Long stated that

Infinite Paths to Infinite Reality... is a book whose significance is highly likely to reverberate throughout the fields of both the philosophy of religion and the study of Indian philosophy for years to come. It will certainly revolutionize, or at the very least raise important questions for, any future studies of the teachings of... Sri Ramakrishna Paramahamsa.... [the author, now known as] Swami Medhananda is to be commended and thanked for offering the scholarly community such a creative and provocative example of cross-cultural philosophy, with such great potential to advance the philosophical conversation and enhance scholarly appreciation of Sri Ramakrishna.

In Notre Dame Philosophical Reviews, Samta Pandya of the Tata Institute of Social Sciences described Infinite Paths as "combin[ing] detailed exegesis with cross-cultural philosophical investigation". and as having "a broad interdisciplinary appeal... a good reference for scholars of religious studies, Hindu studies, and comparative theology".

In The Indian Express, Pratap Bhanu Mehta, Vice-Chancellor of Ashoka University, characterized Infinite Paths as "a pathbreaking work... philosophically astute, textually scrupulous, and [an] imaginatively subtle reconstruction of Ramakrishna Paramhansa's teachings". Mehta views Infinite Paths as treating [Ramakrishna] as a "philosopher of unusual depth and consistency", and as defending

Ramakrishna against the charge of an indiscriminate eclecticism on the one hand, or a covert hierarchy on the other. [The book] meticulously reconstructs Ramakrishna’s thought around four pillars: the nature of God’s infinitude, the nature of religious pluralism, the epistemology of mystical experience and the problem of evil. In each of these four areas, Maharaj both advances an original interpretive thesis and brings Ramakrishna into a dialogue with comparative philosophy and religious practice.

In Reading Religion, published by the American Academy of Religion, Swami Narasimhananda stated that "Maharaj has given the world of religious literature a historically important work that situates Sri Ramakrishna as a philosopher in his own right. Maharaj’s work brings home the urgency to actively engage with Indian thought that is often hidden in the precepts of saints and mystics." The Swami, who is editor of Prabuddha Bharata, noted that previous "academic engagements with [Sri Ramakrishna's]... precepts have been negligible." He suggested that "The task that Maharaj has set before himself is daunting," and reported that in analyzing Sri Ramakrishna's teachings through five interpretive principles, Maharaj

arrives at six central tenets of Sri Ramakrishna’s Vijñāna Vedanta. This is Maharaj’s singular contribution to Sri Ramakrishna scholarship. Through this approach, Maharaj gives his readers an excellent model for doing cross-cultural philosophy. In his interpretive principles, Maharaj holds that Sri Ramakrishna’s philosophy is self-contained, context-based, nonsectarian, spiritual, and syncretic. Maharaj argues that the central tenets of Sri Ramakrishna’s philosophy are the state of vijñāna, the ultimate authority of spiritual experience, the statement that the Infinite Divine Reality is both personal and impersonal, the proclamation that there are two levels of Advaitic realization, the teaching that the vijñānī accepts both the nitya (real) and the līlā (apparent), and the message that various religious paths are "salvifically efficacious paths to realizing God" (44).

The International Journal of Hindu Studies published a book review symposium on Infinite Paths to Infinite Reality in its issue of August 2021 (volume 25, numbers 1-2). The symposium contained separate commentaries by Jonathan C. Gold, Jeffery D. Long, Jonathan B. Edelmann, Michael S. Allen, Benedikt Paul Göcke, Perry Schmidt-Leukel, Francis X. Clooney, Christopher J. Bartley, Amiya P. Sen, Ethan Mills, Arvind Sharma, Julius Lipner, and Michael Williams, followed by a reply by the book's author, Swami Medhananda (formerly known as Ayon Maharaj). As part of Medhananda's response to the 13 commentators on his book, he contextualized his book as follows:

there are many ways to philosophize, and one typical way to do analytic philosophy is to stake out a philosophical position and defend it against rival positions. For instance, the renowned Catholic philosopher of religion Eleonore Stump, in her book Wandering in Darkness: Narrative and the Problem of Suffering (2010), provides a detailed interpretation of the theodicy of Saint Thomas Aquinas and defends its philosophical cogency and contemporary value. It would make little sense to fault Stump for having a Catholic bias or for failing to criticize Aquinas, since the aim of her book is precisely to defend his theodicy. The more rigorous and charitable way to engage her book is to examine her interpretation of Aquinas’s theodicy and identify the strengths and weaknesses of her philosophical arguments in support of his theodicy. My aims in IPIR parallel those of Stump. I attempted to reconstruct Ramakrsna's philosophical views on four key topics — namely, God, religious pluralism, mystical experience, and the problem of evil — and to argue, from a cross-cultural perspective, that his views have distinct advantages over rival positions held by recent Western philosophers of religion.

== Editions ==
The original edition was published in hardcover by in 2018 by Oxford University Press. An Indian hardcover edition was published in 2019.

- Maharaj, Ayon (2018). Infinite paths to infinite reality: Sri Ramakrishna and cross-cultural philosophy of religion. Oxford University Press. ISBN 9780190868239. OCLC 1079877496.
- Maharaj, Ayon (2019). Infinite paths to infinite reality: Sri Ramakrishna and cross-cultural philosophy of religion. Oxford University Press India. ISBN 9780190053758. ISBN 0190053755

== See also ==
- Unifying Hinduism (book by Andrew Nicholson)
