= Pravrajika Vrajaprana =

American Hindu scholar, writer (born 1968)

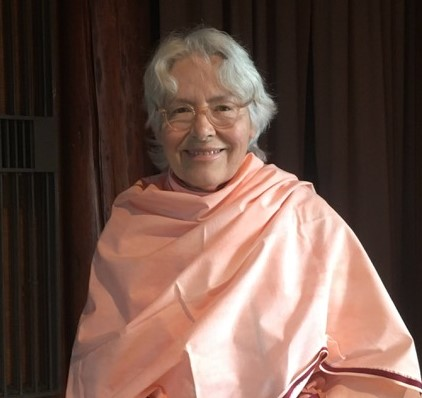
- Born: 1952 (age 73–74); California, U.S.
- Occupations: Pravrajika (or sannyasini), writer
- Known for: Writer on Vedanta, Swami Vivekananda, Ramakrishna, Christopher Isherwood.

Pravrajika Vrajaprana (born 1952) is a sannyasini or pravrajika (female swami) at the Vedanta Society of Southern California, affiliated with the Ramakrishna Order. She resides at Sarada Convent in Santa Barbara, California and a writer on Vedanta, the history and growth of the Vedanta Societies.

She is also a well known speaker and scholar on Hinduism and she speaks frequently at colleges, universities and interfaith gatherings and is the Hindu chaplain at Cottage Hospital in Santa Barbara. Her works on Vedanta include, Vedanta: A Simple Introduction (1999), editor of Living Wisdom (1994). She is the co-author, with Swami Tyagananda, of Interpreting Ramakrishna: Kali's Child Revisited (2010).

Pravrajika Vrajaprana was born in California in 1952. She graduated from the University of California, Santa Cruz, where she also worked briefly as Associate Professor of Literature. She came in contact with Swami Prabhavananda at the Vedanta Society of Santa Barbara in 1967, while involved with anti-Vietnam war activism. In 1977 she joined the Sarada Convent in Santa Barbara. She took the first vows of brahmacharya in 1983 and had final vows of sannyasa in 1988.

Vrajaprana was a co-speaker with the 14th Dalai Lama at the Interfaith Conference in San Francisco (2006). She was a panelist in the discussion on Interpreting Ramakrishna at DANAM, held at the annual AAR meeting 2010.

== Selected works ==
- My Faithful Goodwin. Calcutta: Advaita Ashrama, 1994. ISBN 81-85301-25-5. [Biography of J.J. Goodwin, disciple of Swami Vivekananda.]
- Seeing God Everywhere (editor). Hollywood: Vedanta Press, 1996.
- Living Wisdom: Vedanta in the West, (editor). Hollywood: Vedanta Press, 1994. “A Meaningful Life,” 58–62.
- A Portrait of Sister Christine. Calcutta: Ramakrishna Mission Institute of Culture, 1996. ISBN 81-85843-80-5.
- Vedanta: A Simple Introduction. Hollywood: Vedanta Press, 1999.
- Review of Kali’s Child: The Mystical and the Erotic in the Life of Ramakrishna. In Hindu-Christian Studies Bulletin, 10, (1997).
- "Contemporary Spirituality and the Thinning of the Sacred: A Hindu Perspective". Cross Currents: 248–256. Spring–Summer 2000. Archived from the original on 2015-10-08 – via Questia.
- "Regaining the Lost Kingdom: Purity and Meditation in the Hindu Spiritual Tradition." In Purity of Heart and Contemplation: A Monastic Dialogue Between Christian and Asian Traditions, ed. Bruno Barnhart and Joseph Wong. New York: Continuum, December, 2001, pp. 23–38.
- "The Convert—Stranger in Our Midst: Crossing Borders in Two Worlds." In The Stranger’s Religion: Fascination and Fear, ed. Anna Lännström. Notre Dame, IN: University of Notre Dame Press, 2004, pp. 169–185.
- "Looking In and Letting Go: Viveka and Vairâgya in the Vedanta Tradition." In Asceticism, Identity and Pedagogy in Dharma Traditions, ed. Graham M. Schweig, Jeffery D. Long, Ramdas Lamb, Adarsh Deepak. Hampton, VA: Deepak Heritage Books. 2006, pp. 33–48.
- "The Guru and His Queer Disciple: The Guru-Disciple Relationship as the Locus of Christopher Isherwood’s Advaita Vedanta." Postscripts: The Journal of Sacred Texts & Contemporary Worlds (November 2010) 243–258.
- Interpreting Ramakrishna: Kali's Child Revisited, co-authored with Swami Tyagananda. Delhi: Motilal Banarsidass, 2010.
- "Interfaith Incognito or What a Hindu Nun Learned from Christian Evangelicals" in My Neighbor's Faith: Stories of Interreligious Encounter, Growth, and Transformation, ed. Rabbi Or Rose and Jennifer Peace. New York: Orbis Books, 2012, pp. 20–24.
- “Perfect Independence”: Vivekananda, Freedom, and Women in Swami Vivekananda: His Life, Legacy, and Liberative Ethics, ed. Rita D. Sharma. Lanham, MD: Lexington Books, 2021, pp. 145–158.

== See also ==
- Swami Atmajnanananda
