= Akshay Kumar Sen =

19th century Bengali mystic and saint

- Akshay Kumar Sen, an important disciple of Sri Ramakrishna and author of Sri Ramakrishna Punthi, a source of valuable information on Sri Ramakrishna's life
- Born: 1854; Maynapur village, Bankura district, Bengal, British India
- Died: 7 December 1923 (aged 68–69); Calcutta, Bengal, British India
- Occupations: Author, Disciple of Sri Ramakrishna
- Writing career
- Language: Bengali
- Notable work: Sri Ramakrishna Punthi
- Literary movement: Bengal Renaissance, Ramakrishna

Akshay Kumar Sen was one of the lay disciples of Sri Ramakrishna, the 19th century Bengali mystic and saint. He was the author of the book Sri Ramkrishna Punthi, a long narrative poem on the life and teachings of one of the most illustrious figures of 19th-century India. After reading the work, Swami Vivekananda wrote from the United States to a brother monk in India, "Give Akshaya a hundred thousand hearty embraces from me. Through his pen Sri Ramakrishna is manifesting himself. Blessed is Akshaya."

== Biography ==
=== Early days ===
Akshay Kumar Sen was born in 1854 in a village called Maynapur in the Bankura district of Bengal to Haladhar Sen and Bidhumukhi Devi. He belonged to a very poor family and did not have means to get a good education. He was married and had two sons and a daughter. Sen moved to Calcutta, where he was employed as a private tutor of the children of the Tagore family. In 1885, he had a chance encounter of Sri Ramakrishna when the later came down to visit one of his devotees, Mahimacharan in Calcutta. Akshaya accompanied another devotee, Devendranath Majumdar, to Mahimacharan's house.

=== Subsequent meetings with Sri Ramakrishna ===
After the first meeting, Akshay had several other meetings with Sri Ramakrishna. He went to Dakshineswar temple with one of his friends. Although he himself did not have much interaction with Ramakrishna, he listened to his discourses keenly, which subsequently formed the subject of his writings on Sri Ramakrishna. In April 1885 Devendra arranged a festival at his house in Sri Ramakrishna's honour and Akshay was invited. He often had experiences by which he felt that the master was deliberately ignoring him. But he kept coming back to Sri Ramakrishna with patience and devotion.

==== Kalpataru (the wish fulfilling tree) day ====
In December 1885, the condition of Sri Ramakrishna, who was suffering from throat cancer, worsened, and he had to be transferred to a spacious rented garden house in Cossipore, near Calcutta. On 1 January 1886, Sri Ramakrishna came out for a walk and showered blessings on all his disciples. The day is known as Kalpataru Day in the circle of Sri Ramakrishna devotees. Kalpataru is a mythical wish fulfilling tree.

Akshay recalls what happened to him in his own narrative: "When it was about 3 o'clock, the Master came downstairs and walked towards the garden path. The devotees followed him. All others, who were elsewhere, hearing that the Master was walking in the garden, rushed there. We came down at once and quickly went to the place where the Master was walking with the other devotees. I stood on one side behind the Master. Two beautiful champa flowers were in my hands. The great devotee Girish (Chandra Ghosh) was near the Master and talking with him. The Master was charmingly dressed that day. Looking at him once, the form cannot be forgotten. He wore a red bordered cotton cloth. A green coloured coat was on his body. He had a cotton cap which covered his head and also his ears. On his feet there were socks and slippers which had decorations of creepers and leaves on them. His face was shining and luminous. Though the body was emaciated by his terrible illness, his face was charming and rays of light were always playing on it...... A little afterwards, the Master blessed the devotees and raising his right hand said, 'May you have (God)consciousness. What else can I say?' Then the Master returned to the path leading towards the house. I was standing some distance away. From there he addressed me, 'Hello, my boy, what are you doing?' He then came near, touched my chest with his hand and recited something in my ear which, being a Maha-mantra, I shall keep secret. What did I see and what did I hear? I shall only say that my heart's desire was fulfilled that day and I only wish to pass the rest of my days in singing the glory of Sri Ramakrishna."

=== Literary pursuits ===
After Sri Ramakrishna's death in August 1886, Akshay decided to pen down some of his teachings in the form of a long narrative poem. He was encouraged in this effort by Swami Vivekananda. In 1887, he started writing the verses and after finishing a part of it he got it reviewed by Swami Vivekananda who was impressed by his writings and took him to holy mother Sri Sarada Devi. He wrote the work in the form of a panchali or long narrative poem in a local style prevalent in Bengal between 1884 and 1901. He sent a copy of his work to Swami Vivekananda, who was ecstatic by the depiction. The book was initially named as Charitamrita and then later came to be known as Sri Sri Ramakrishna Punthi. The book has been translated into English prose under the title A Portrait of Sri Ramakrishna. Apart from the Punthi, Akshay also wrote The Teachings of Sri Ramakrishna in 1896 and The Glory of Sri Ramakrishna (Srî Srî Râmakrishna - Mahimâ) in 1910, both in Bengali. Critics say the Punthi is a complementary work to two other authoritative volumes on Sri Ramakrishna, the Gospel of Sri Ramakrishna by 'M' and Sri Ramakrishna the Great Master by Swami Saradananda.

=== Later life ===
Afterwards Akshaya returned to his native village and despite moderate success of his books he remained poor. He travelled to the birthplace of Sri Ramakrishna, Kamarpukur and met the holy mother Sarada Devi. He died of bloody dysentery on 7 December 1923.
