= Swami Tyagananda =

- Born: 1956 (age 69–70)
- Education: University of Bombay
- Occupations: Head of the Vedanta Society, Boston. Chaplain at MIT, Harvard

Swami Tyagananda is a Hindu monk of the Ramakrishna Order and became head of the Vedanta Society in Boston in 2002. He is the Hindu chaplain for the Massachusetts Institute of Technology and Harvard University. He has presented papers at academic conferences, and he gives lectures and classes at the Vedanta Society, MIT, Harvard, and other colleges in and around Boston.

== Biography ==
He joined the Ramakrishna Order as a monk in 1976, after graduating from the University of Bombay, India. Swami Tyagananda has served in the following monasteries:

- Mumbai 1976-1980
- Belur Math 1980-1982
- Ramakrishna Mission, Delhi 1982-1983
- Chennai 1983-1997
- Boston since 1998

Swami Tyagananda was the editor of the English language journal Vedanta Kesari based in Chennai, India. For eleven years. He has translated and edited ten books, including Monasticism: Ideals and Traditions (1991), Values: The Key to a Meaningful Life (1996) and The Essence of the Gita (2000).

Swami Tyagananda also wrote the paper Kali’s Child Revisited or Didn’t Anyone Check the Documentation, in which he examines a list of what he calls "serious errors" that he had found in Jeffery Kripal's book, Kali's Child. Copies of Kali's Child Revisited were distributed at the annual meeting of the AAR and published in journal Evam. Other scholars, such as Lola Williamson from University of Wisconsin, Madison, expressed the view that Swami Tyagananda’s criticisms in Kali's Child Revisited "indeed go to the heart of things". In 2010, Tyagananda co-authored the book Interpreting Ramakrishna: Kali's Child Revisited with Pravrajika Vrajaprana which further discusses these issues.

In a departure from earlier Hindu traditions, in compliance with the practice prevalent in almost all centers of the Ramakrishna Math and Mission, Swami Tyagananda also conducts a special service during Christmas Eve. The event begins with the garlanding of an image of Madonna and Child. The Nativity story from the King James Bible is then read out loud, followed by the Sermon on the Mount and a homily on Jesus' life. The 139th MIT Commencement ceremony in 2005 began with Swami Tyagananda's invocation in Sanskrit and English.

== Works ==
- Walking the Walk: A Manual of Karma Yoga Chennai: Sri Ramakrishna Math, 2014.
- Interpreting Ramakrishna: Kali's Child Revisited. Delhi: Motilal Banarsidass, 2010. Co-authored with Pravrajika Vrajaprana.
- The Essence of the Gita (translator). Chennai: Sri Ramakrishna Math, 2000.
- A Study of the Mundaka Upanishad (ed and compiler). Calcutta: Advaita Ashrama, 2000.
- Healthy Mind, Healthy Body: New Thoughts on Health (ed). Chennai: Sri Ramakrishna Math, 1997.
- Values: The Key to a Meaningful Life (ed). Chennai: Sri Ramakrishna Math, 1996.
- Service: Its Ideal and Practice (ed). Chennai: Sri Ramakrishna Math, 1993.
- Religion Today (ed). Chennai: Sri Ramakrishna Math, 1992.
- Monasticism: Ideals and Traditions (ed). Chennai: Sri Ramakrishna Math, 1991.
- Saints and Mystics (ed). Chennai: Sri Ramakrishna Math, 1990.
- Holy Scriptures: A Symposium on the Great Scriptures of the World (ed). Chennai: Sri Ramakrishna Math, 1989.
- Facets of Vivekananda (ed). Chennai: Sri Ramakrishna Math, 1987.
