= Vijñāna =

Indic term for ideas related to discernment, mind/consciousness, life force, etc

Translations of Vijñāna
- English: discernment (Hinduism & Buddhism); understanding, knowledge (Hinduism); consciousness, mind, life force (Buddhism)
- Sanskrit: विज्ञान (vijñāna)
- Pali: विञ्ञाण (viññāṇa)
- Burmese: ဝိညာဉ် (MLCTS: wḭ ɲɪ̀ɰ̃)
- Chinese: 識 (T) / 识 (S) (Pinyin: shí)
- Indonesian: kesadaran; pengetahu
- Japanese: 識 (shiki)
- Khmer: វិញ្ញាណ (UNGEGN: vĭnhnhéan)
- Korean: 식/識 (sik)
- Sinhala: විඥ්ඥාන
- Tagalog: ᜊᜒᜈᜀᜈᜀ (binana)
- Tibetan: རྣམ་པར་ཤེས་པ་ (rnam par shes pa)
- Thai: วิญญาณ (RTGS: winyan)
- Vietnamese: 識 (thức)

Vijñāna (Sanskrit: विज्ञान) or viññāṇa (Pali: विञ्ञाण) is translated as "consciousness", "life force", "mind", or "discernment".

The term vijñāna is mentioned in many early Upanishads, where it has been translated by terms such as understanding, knowledge, and intelligence.

In the Pāli Canon's Sutta Pitaka's first four nikāyas, viññāṇa is one of three overlapping Pali terms used to refer to the mind, the others being manas and citta. Each is used in the generic and non-technical sense of "mind" in general, but the three are sometimes used in sequence to refer to one's mental processes as a whole. Their primary uses are, however, distinct.

== Buddhism ==
This section considers the Buddhist concept primarily in terms of Early Buddhism's Pali literature as well as in the literature of other Buddhist schools.

=== Pali literature ===
Throughout Pali literature, viññāṇa can be found as one of a handful of synonyms for the mental force that animates the otherwise inert material body. In a number of Pali texts though, the term has a more nuanced and context-specific (or "technical") meaning. In particular, in the Pali Canon's "Discourse Basket" (Suttapitaka), viññāṇa (generally translated as "consciousness") is discussed in at least three related but different contexts:

(1) as a derivative of the sense bases (āyatana), part of the experientially exhaustive "All" (sabba);
(2) as one of the five aggregates (khandha) of clinging (upadana) at the root of suffering (dukkha); and,
(3) as one of the twelve causes (nidana) of "Dependent Origination" (paticcasamuppāda) which provides a template for Buddhist notions of kamma, rebirth and release.

In the Pali Canon's Abhidhamma and in post-canonical Pali commentaries, consciousness (viññāṇa) is further analyzed into 89 different states which are categorized in accordance with their karmic results.

Figure 1: The Pali Canon's Six Sextets:

sense bases (āyatana)

→

feeling ︵vedanā︶

→

craving ︵taṇhā︶

"internal"
sense
organs
<–>
"external"
sense
objects

↓
↓
↓
contact (phassa)
↓
↑

consciousness (viññāṇa)

1. The six internal sense bases are the eye, ear,
  nose, tongue, body & mind.
2. The six external sense bases are visible forms,
  sound, odor, flavors, touch & mental objects.
3. Sense-specific consciousness arises dependent
  on an internal & an external sense base.
4. Contact is the meeting of an internal sense
  base, external sense base & consciousness.
5. Feeling is dependent on contact.
6. Craving is dependent on feeling.
Source: MN 148 (Thanissaro, 1998) diagram details

Figure 2:
The Five Aggregates (pañcakkhandha)
according to the Pali Canon.

form (rūpa)
| 4 elements (mahābhūta) |
| | ↓ |
| | contact (phassa) |
| ↓ | ↑ |
consciousness (viññāna)

→
←

←

| mental factors (cetasika) |
feeling (vedanā)
perception (sañña)
formation (saṅkhāra)

- Form is derived from the Four Great Elements.
- Consciousness arises from other aggregates.
- Mental Factors arise from the Contact of
  Consciousness and other aggregates.
- The five aggregates are no-self.

Source: MN 109 (Thanissaro, 2001) | diagram details

==== Sense-base derivative ====
In Buddhism, the six sense bases (Pali: saḷāyatana; Skt.: ṣaḍāyatana) refer to the five physical sense organs (cf. receptive field) (belonging to the eye, ear, nose, tongue, body), the mind (referred to as the sixth sense base) and their associated objects (visual forms, sounds, odors, flavors, touch and mental objects). Based on the six sense bases, a number of mental factors arise including six "types" or "classes" of consciousness (viññāṇa-kāyā). More specifically, according to this analysis, the six types of consciousness are eye-consciousness (that is, consciousness based on the eye), ear-consciousness, nose-consciousness, tongue-consciousness, body-consciousness and mind-consciousness.

In this context, for instance, when an ear's receptive field (the proximal stimulus, more commonly known by Buddhists as a sense base, or sense organ) and sound (the distal stimulus, or sense object) are present, the associated (ear-related) consciousness arises. The arising of these three elements (dhātu) – e.g. ear, sound and ear-consciousness – lead to the percept, known as "contact" and in turn causes a pleasant, unpleasant or neutral "feeling" to arise. It is from such feeling that "craving" arises. (See Fig. 1.)

In a discourse entitled, "The All" (Sabba Sutta, SN 35.23), the Buddha states that there is no "all" outside of the six pairs of sense bases (that is, six internal and six external sense bases). The "To Be Abandoned Discourse" (Pahanaya Sutta, SN 35.24) further expands the All to include first five aforementioned sextets (internal sense bases, external sense bases, consciousness, contact and feeling). In the famed "Fire Sermon" (Ādittapariyāya Sutta, SN 35.28) the Buddha declares that "the All is aflame" with passion, aversion, delusion and suffering (dukkha); to obtain release from this suffering, one should become disenchanted with the All.

Hence, in this context, viññāṇa includes the following characteristics:

- viññāṇa arises as a result of the material sense bases (āyatana)
- there are six types of consciousness, each unique to one of the internal sense organs
- consciousness (viññāṇa) is separate (and arises) from mind (mano)
- here, consciousness cognizes or is aware of its specific sense base (including the mind and mind objects)
- viññāṇa is a prerequisite for the arising of craving (taṇhā)
- hence, for the vanquishing of suffering (dukkha), one should neither identify with nor attach to viññāṇa

==== The aggregates ====
In Buddhism, consciousness (viññāṇa) is one of the five classically defined experiential "aggregates" (Pali: khandha; Skt.: skandha). As illustrated (Fig. 2), the four other aggregates are material "form" (rupa), "feeling" or "sensation" (vedana), "perception" (sanna), and "volitional formations" or "fabrications" (sankhara).

In SN 22.79, the Buddha distinguishes consciousness in the following manner:

"And why do you call it 'consciousness'? Because it cognizes, thus it is called consciousness. What does it cognize? It cognizes what is sour, bitter, pungent, sweet, alkaline, non-alkaline, salty, & unsalty. Because it cognizes, it is called consciousness."

This type of awareness appears to be more refined and introspective than that associated with the aggregate of perception (saññā) which the Buddha describes in the same discourse as follows:

"And why do you call it 'perception'? Because it perceives, thus it is called 'perception.' What does it perceive? It perceives blue, it perceives yellow, it perceives red, it perceives white. Because it perceives, it is called perception."

Similarly, in a 5th-century CE commentary, the Visuddhimagga, there is an extended analogy about a child, an adult villager and an expert "money-changer" seeing a heap of coins; the child's experience is likened to perception, the villager's experience to consciousness, and the money-changer's experience to true understanding (paňňā). Thus, in this context, "consciousness" denotes more than the irreducible subjective experience of sense data suggested in the discourses of "the All" (see prior section); it additionally entails a depth of awareness reflecting a degree of memory and recognition.

All of the aggregates are to be seen as empty of self-nature; that is, they arise dependent on causes (hetu) and conditions (paticca). In this scheme, the cause for the arising of consciousness (viññāṇa) is the arising of one of the other aggregates (physical or mental); and the arising of consciousness in turn gives rise to one or more of the mental (nāma) aggregates. In this way, the chain of causation identified in the aggregate (khandha) model overlaps the chain of conditioning in the Dependent Origination (paticcasamuppāda) model.

==== Dependent origination ====
Consciousness (viññāṇa) is the third of the traditionally enumerated Twelve Causes (nidāna) of Dependent Origination (Pali: paṭiccasamuppāda; Skt.: pratītyasamutpāda). Within the context of Dependent Origination, different canonical discourses represent different aspects of consciousness. The following aspects are traditionally highlighted:

- consciousness is conditioned by mental fabrications (saṅkhāra);
- consciousness and the mind-body (nāmarūpa, named form, conception) are interdependent; and,
- consciousness acts as a "life force" by which there is a continuity across rebirths.

===== Mental-fabrication conditioning and kamma =====
Numerous discourses state:

"From fabrications [saṅkhāra] as a requisite condition comes consciousness [viññāṇa]."

In three discourses in the Samyutta Nikaya, the Buddha highlights three particular manifestations of saṅkhāra as particularly creating a "basis for the maintenance of consciousness" (ārammaṇaṃ ... viññāṇassa ṭhitiyā) that could lead to future existence, to the perpetuation of bodily and mental processes (conception), and to craving and its resultant suffering. As stated in the common text below (in English and Pali), these three manifestations are intending, planning and enactments of latent tendencies ("obsessing")

| The 12 Nidānas: |
|---|
Ignorance
↓
Formations
↓
Consciousness
↓
Name & Form
↓
Six Sense Bases
↓
Contact
↓
Feeling
↓
Craving
↓
Clinging
↓
Becoming
↓
Birth
↓
Old Age & Death

| ... [W]hat one intends, and what one plans, and whatever one has a tendency towards: this becomes a basis for the maintenance of consciousness. When there is a basis there is a support for the establishing of consciousness. | Yañca ... ceteti, yañca pakappeti, yañca anuseti, ārammaṇametaṃ hoti viññāṇassa ṭhitiyā. Ārammaṇe sati patiṭṭhā viññāṇassa hoti. |

Thus, for instance, in the "Intention Discourse" (Cetanā Sutta, SN 12.38), the Buddha more fully elaborates:

Bhikkhus, what one intends, and what one plans, and whatever one has a tendency towards: this becomes a basis for the maintenance of consciousness. When there is a basis there is a support for the establishing of consciousness. When consciousness is established and has come to growth, there is the production of future renewed existence. When there is the production of future renewed existence, future birth, aging-and-death, sorrow, lamentation, pain, displeasure, and despair come to be. Such is the origin of this whole mass of suffering.

The language of the post-canonical Samyutta Nikaya commentary and subcommentary further affirm that this text is discussing the means by which "kammic [karmic] consciousness" "yield[s] fruit in one's mental continuum." In other words, certain intentional or obsessive acts on one's part inherently establish in present consciousness a basis for future consciousness's existence; in this way, the future existence is conditioned by certain aspects of the initial intention, including its wholesome and unwholesome qualities.

Conversely, in the "Attached Discourse" (Upaya Sutta, SN 22.53), it states that if passion for the five aggregates (forms and mental processes) are abandoned then:

"... owing to the abandonment of passion, the support is cut off, and there is no base for consciousness. Consciousness, thus unestablished, not proliferating, not performing any function, is released. Owing to its release, it is steady. Owing to its steadiness, it is contented. Owing to its contentment, it is not agitated. Not agitated, he (the monk) is totally unbound right within. He discerns that 'Birth is ended, the holy life fulfilled, the task done. There is nothing further for this world.'"

===== Mind-body interdependency =====
Numerous discourses state:

"From consciousness [viññāṇa] as a requisite condition comes mind and matter [nāmarūpa] (conception)."

In addition, a few discourses state that, simultaneously, the converse is true:

"Consciousness comes from mind and matter as its requisite condition."

In the "Sheaves of Reeds Discourse" (Nalakalapiyo Sutta, SN 12.67), Ven. Sariputta uses this famous analogy to explain the interdependency of consciousness and mind and matter:

"It is as if two sheaves of reeds were to stand leaning against one another. In the same way, from mind and matter as a requisite condition comes consciousness, from consciousness as a requisite condition comes mind and matter....
"If one were to pull away one of those sheaves of reeds, the other would fall; if one were to pull away the other, the first one would fall. In the same way, from the cessation of mind and matter comes the cessation of consciousness, from the cessation of consciousness comes the cessation of mind and matter...."

===== "Life force" aspect and rebirth =====
As described above in the discussion of mental fabrications' conditioning of consciousness, past intentional actions establish a karmic seed within consciousness that expresses itself in the future. Through consciousness's "life force" aspect, these future expressions are not only within a single lifespan but propel karmic impulses (kammavega) across samsaric rebirths.

In the "Serene Faith Discourse" (Sampasadaniya Sutta, DN 28), Ven. Sariputta references not a singular conscious entity but a "stream of consciousness" (viññāṇa-sota) that spans multiple lives:

"... [U]nsurpassed is the Blessed Lord's way of teaching Dhamma in regard to the attainment of vision.... Here, some ascetic or Brahmin, by means of ardour, endeavour, application, vigilance and due attention, reaches such a level of concentration that he ... comes to know the unbroken stream of human consciousness as established both in this world and in the next...."

The "Great Causes Discourse" (Mahanidana Sutta, DN 15), in a dialogue between the Buddha and the Ven. Ananda, describes "consciousness" (viññāṇa) in a way that underlines its "life force" aspect:

"'From consciousness as a requisite condition comes name-and-form.' Thus it has been said. And this is the way to understand how from consciousness as a requisite condition comes name-and-form. If consciousness were not to descend into the mother's womb, would name-and-form take shape in the womb?"

"No, lord."

"If, after descending into the womb, consciousness were to depart, would name-and-form be produced for this world?"

"No, lord."

"If the consciousness of the young boy or girl were to be cut off, would name-and-form ripen, grow, and reach maturity?"

"No, lord."

"Thus this is a cause, this is a reason, this is an origination, this is a requisite condition for name-and-form, i.e., consciousness."

Discourses such as this appear to describe a consciousness that is an animating phenomenon capable of spanning lives thus giving rise to rebirth.

An Anguttara Nikaya discourse provides a memorable metaphor to describe the interplay of kamma, consciousness, craving and rebirth:

[Ananda:] "One speaks, Lord, of 'becoming, becoming'. How does becoming tak[e] place?"
[Buddha:] "... Ānanda, kamma is the field, consciousness the seed and craving the moisture for consciousness of beings hindered by ignorance and fettered by craving to become established in [one of the "three worlds"]. Thus, there is re-becoming in the future."

==== Abhidhammic analysis ====
The Patthana, part of the Theravadin Abhidharma, analyzes the different states of consciousness and their functions. The Theravāda school method is to study every state of consciousness. Using this method, some states of consciousness are identified as positive, some negative and some neutral. This analysis is based on the principle of karma, the main point in understanding the different consciousnesses. Altogether, according to the Abhidhamma, there are 89 kinds of consciousness. Fifty-four are of the "sense sphere" (related to the five physical senses as well as craving for sensual pleasure), 15 of the "fine-material sphere" (related to the meditative absorptions based on material objects), 12 of the "immaterial sphere" (related to the immaterial meditative absorptions), and eight are supramundane (related to the realization of Nibbāna).

More specifically, a viññāṇa is a single moment of conceptual consciousness and normal mental activity is considered to consist of a continual succession of viññāṇas.

Viññāṇa has two components: the awareness itself, and the object of that awareness (which might be a perception, a feeling etc.). Thus, in this way, these viññāṇas are not considered as ultimate (underived) phenomena as they are based on mental factors (cetasika). For example, jhānic (meditative) states are described as based on the five ultimate mental factors of applied thought (vitakka), sustained thought (vicara), rapture (piti), serenity (sukha) and one-pointedness (ekaggatā).

==== Overlapping Pali terms for mind ====
According to Bhikkhu Bodhi, the post-canonical Pali commentary uses the three terms viññāṇa, mano and citta as synonyms for the mind sense base (mana-ayatana); however, in the Sutta Pitaka, these three terms are generally contextualized differently:

- Viññāṇa refers to awareness through a specific internal sense base, that is, through the eye, ear, nose, tongue, body or mind. Thus, there are six sense-specific types of Viññāṇa. It is also the basis for personal continuity within and across lives.
- Manas refers to mental "actions" (kamma), as opposed to those actions that are physical or verbal. It is also the sixth internal sense base (ayatana), that is, the "mind base," cognizing mental sensa (dhammā) as well as sensory information from the physical sense bases.
- Citta includes the formation of thought, emotion and volition; this is thus the subject of Buddhist mental development (bhava), the mechanism for release.

The citta is called "luminous" in A.I.8-10.

=== Across Buddhist schools ===
While most Buddhist schools identify six modes of consciousness, one for each sense base, some Buddhist schools have identified additional modes.

==== Six vijñānas ====
As described above, in reference to the "All" (sabba), the Sutta Pitaka identifies six vijñānas related to the six sense bases:

1. Eye consciousness
2. Ear consciousness
3. Nose consciousness
4. Tongue consciousness
5. Body consciousness
6. Mind consciousness describe the consciousness of "ideas" - Buddhism describes not five but six perceptions.

==== Eight vijñānas ====
The Yogacara / Cittamatra school consider two more consciousnesses.

1. a consciousness called klistamanas, which gathers the hindrances, the poisons, the karmic formations.
2. the ālayavijñāna is the consciousness "basis of everything" and has been translated as "store consciousness". Every consciousness is based on this one. It is the phenomenon which explains the rebirth.

According to Walpola Rahula, the "store consciousness" of Yogacara thought exists in the early texts as well, as the "citta."

==== Amalavijñāna ====
The amalavijñāna (阿摩羅識), "immaculate consciousness", is considered by some Yogācāra schools as a ninth level of consciousness. This "pure consciousness is identified with the nature of reality (parinispanna) or Suchness." Alternatively, amalavijñāna may be considered the pure aspect of ālayavijñāna.

Some Buddhists also suggest hrdaya (Heart) consciousnesses (一切一心識), or an eleven consciousnesses theory or an infinity consciousness (無量識).

=== Contemporary usages ===
Viññāna is used in Thai Buddhism to refer specifically to one's consciousness or life-force after it has left the body at the moment of death. Thais differentiate between winyaan and "jid-jai" (จิตใจ), which is the consciousness while it is still connected to a living body. Some believe that the jid-jai leaves the body while one dreams at night and also that it can externalize during advanced meditation practice, but that it is still connected to the body at such times.

== Hinduism ==
Sri Ramakrishna defines vijñāna as

"He alone who, after reaching the Nitya, the Absolute, can dwell in the Līlā, the Relative, and again climb from the Līlā to the Nitya, has ripe knowledge and devotion. Sages like Narada cherished love of God after attaining the Knowledge of Brahman. This is called vijnāna." Also: "What is vijnana? It is to know God distinctly by realizing His existence through an intuitive experience and to speak to Him intimately."

Ayon Maharaj, also known as Swami Medhananda, has characterized Sri Ramakrishna's views as manifesting what he called a "philosophy of Vijñāna Vedānta". In his book Infinite Paths to Infinite Reality (2018), Maharaj describes six major tenets of Ramakrishna's Vijñāna Vedānta. These include the notion that "the vijñānī returns from the state of nirvikalpa samādhi and attains the richer, world-affirming nondual realization that God has become everything."

Based on ancient texts, V.S.Apte (1890, rev. 1957-59) provides the following definition for vijñānam (विज्ञानम्):

1. Knowledge, wisdom, intelligence, understanding; यज्जीव्यते क्षणमपि प्रथितं मनुष्यैर्विज्ञानशौर्यविभवार्यगुणैः समेतम्। तन्नाम जीवितमिह ... Panchatantra (Pt.) 1.24;5.3; विज्ञानमयः कोशः 'the sheath of intelligence' (the first of the five sheaths of the soul).
2. Discrimination, discernment.
3. Skill, proficiency; प्रयोगविज्ञानम् - Shringara Tilaka (Ś.) 1.2.
4. Worldly or profane knowledge, knowledge derived from worldly experience (opp. ज्ञान which is 'knowledge of Brahma or Supreme Spirit'); ज्ञानं ते$हं सविज्ञानमिदं वक्ष्याम्यशेषत - Bhagavad Gita (Bg.) 7.2;3.41;6.8; (the whole of the 7th Adhyāya of Bg. explains ज्ञान and विज्ञान).
5. Business, employment.
6. Music.
7. Knowledge of the fourteen lores.
8. The organ of knowledge; पञ्चविज्ञानचेतने (शरीरे) - Mahabharata (Mb.) 12.187. 12.
9. Knowledge beyond the cognisance of the senses (अतीन्द्रियविषय)

In addition, Monier Williams (1899; rev. 2008) provides the following definition:

1. to distinguish, discern, observe, investigate, recognize ascertain, know, understand - Rig Veda (RV.), etc., etc. (with na and inf.: 'to know not how to');
2. to have right knowledge - Katha Upanishad (KaṭhUp.)
3. to become wise or learned - Mn. iv, 20;
4. to hear or learn from (gen.) - Chandogya Upanishad (ChUp.); Mahabharata (MBh.);
5. to recognize in (loc.) - Panchatantra (Pañcat.);
6. to look upon or regard or consider as (two acc.), Mn.; MBh., etc.; Kāv., etc.;
7. to explain, declare - BhP.

== See also ==
- Aggregates
- Dependent Origination, 12 Causes
- Pratītyasamutpāda
- Luminous consciousness
- Rebirth (Buddhism)
- Sense Bases
- Qi
- Prana
- Energy (esotericism)

== Sources ==
- Apte, Viman Shivaram (1957–59). The practical Sanskrit-English dictionary. Poona: Prasad Prakashan. A general on-line search engine for this dictionary is available at "U. Chicago" at http://dsal.uchicago.edu/dictionaries/apte/.
- Bodhi, Bhikkhu (ed.) (2000a). A Comprehensive Manual of Abhidhamma: The Abhidhammattha Sangaha of Ācariya Anuruddha. Seattle, WA: BPS Pariyatti Editions. ISBN 1-928706-02-9.
- Bodhi, Bhikkhu (trans.) (2000b). The Connected Discourses of the Buddha: A Translation of the Samyutta Nikaya. (Part IV is "The Book of the Six Sense Bases (Salayatanavagga)".) Boston: Wisdom Publications. ISBN 0-86171-331-1.
- Bodhi, Bhikkhu (2006 Sept. 5). MN 148: Chachakka Sutta – The Six Sets of Six (Pt. 1). Retrieved 2008-02-29 from "Bodhi Monastery".
- Buddhaghosa, Bhadantācariya (trans. from Pāli by Bhikkhu Ñāṇamoli) (1999). The Path of Purification: Visuddhimagga. Seattle, WA: BPS Pariyatti Editions. ISBN 1-928706-00-2.
- La Trobe University (n.d.), "Pali Canon Online Database," online search engine of Sri Lanka Tripitaka Project's (SLTP) Pali Canon.
- Monier-Williams, Monier (1899; rev. 2008). A Sanskrit-English Dictionary. Oxford: Clarendon Press. A general on-line search engine for this dictionary is available from "U. Cologne" at
- Ñāṇamoli, Bhikkhu (trans.) & Bodhi, Bhikkhu (ed.) (2001). The Middle-Length Discourses of the Buddha: A Translation of the Majjhima Nikāya. Boston: Wisdom Publications. ISBN 0-86171-072-X.
- Nhat Hanh, Thich (2001). Transformation at the Base: Fifty Verses on the Nature of Consciousness. Berkeley, CA: Parallax Press. ISBN 1-888375-14-0.
- Nikhilananda, Swami (1985), The Gospel of Sri Ramakrishna (Ramakrishna-Vivekananda Center)
- Nyanaponika Thera & Bhikkhu Bodhi (trans.) (1999). Numerical Discourses of the Buddha: An anthology of Suttas from the Aṅguttara Nikāya. Walnut Creek, CA: AltaMira Press. ISBN 0-7425-0405-0.
- Rhys Davids, T.W. & William Stede (eds.) (1921-5). The Pali Text Society's Pali–English Dictionary. Chipstead: Pali Text Society. A general on-line search engine for the PED is available at the University of Chicago.
- Thanissaro Bhikkhu (trans.) (1993). Adittapariyaya Sutta: The Fire Sermon (SN 35.28). Retrieved 2007-11-22 from "Access to Insight".
- Thanissaro Bhikkhu (trans.) (1995). Cetana Sutta: Intention (SN 12.38). Retrieved 2007-11-02 from "Access to Insight".
- Thanissaro Bhikkhu (trans.) (1997a). Maha-nidana Sutta: The Great Causes Discourse (DN 15). Retrieved 2007-11-02 from "Access to Insight".
- Thanissaro Bhikkhu (trans.) (1997b). Paticca-samuppada-vibhanga Sutta: Analysis of Dependent Co-arising (SN 12.2). Retrieved 2007-11-02 from "Access to Insight".
- Thanissaro Bhikkhu (trans.) (1997c). Upaya Sutta: Attached (SN 22.53). Retrieved 2007-11-20 from "Access to Insight".
- Thanissaro Bhikkhu (trans.) (1998). Chachakka Sutta: The Six Sextets (MN 148). Retrieved 2007-06-17 from "Access to Insight".
- Thanissaro Bhikkhu (trans.) (2000). Nalakalapiyo Sutta: Sheaves of Reeds (SN 12.67). Retrieved 2007-11-02 from "Access to Insight".
- Thanissaro Bhikkhu (trans.) (2001a). Khajjaniya Sutta: Chewed Up (SN 22.79). Retrieved 2007-06-17 from "Access to Insight".
- Thanissaro Bhikkhu (trans.) (2001b). Pahanaya Sutta: To Be Abandoned (SN 35.24). Retrieved 2007-06-17 from "Access to Insight".
- Thanissaro Bhikkhu (trans.) (2001c). Sabba Sutta: The All (SN 35.23). Retrieved 2007-06-17 from "Access to Insight".
- Walshe, Maurice (trans.) (1995). The Long Discourses of the Buddha: A Translation of the Dīgha Nikāya. Boston: Wisdom Publications. ISBN 0-86171-103-3.

| Preceded by Saṃskāra | Twelve Nidānas; Vijñāna | Succeeded by Nāmarūpa |
