= Ram Chandra Datta =

Indian government employee, doctor and chemist

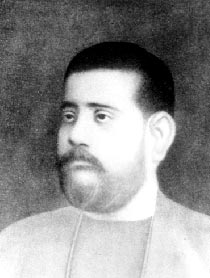
- Ram Chandra Datta
- Born: 30 October 1851; Calcutta, Bengal Presidency, British India
- Died: 17 January 1899 (aged 47); Kankurgachhi, Yogodyan, Calcutta, Bengal Presidency, British India
- Other name: Ram Babu
- Occupations: Government employee Doctor; Chemist; Writer
- Known for: Disciple of Sri RamakrishnaDev
- Relatives: Swami Vivekananda

Ram Chandra Datta (30 October 1851 – 17 January 1899) was a householder disciple of Ramakrishna and a writer. Datta was a relative of Indian monk and social reformer Swami Vivekananda. After completing his graduation, he took job of a Government employee and a chemist. He invented an antidote for blood dysentery from an extract of an indigenous medicinal plant and started promoting "modern science".

Datta became a disciple of Ramakrishna and encouraged Narendranath Datta (pre-monastic name of Swami Vivekananda) to go to Dakshineswar and meet Ramakrishna. He died on 17 January 1899 after suffering from heart disease and chronic asthma.

== Early life ==
Datta was born on 30 October 1851 in Calcutta (The city is currently known as Kolkata). His father Nrisimha Prasad Datta was a devotee of Hindu god Krishna and his mother Tulasimani was known for her generosity and kindness. Datta's mother died when he was two and a half years old. Bhubaneshwari, who was a relative, mother of Vivekananda, tended to him and brought him up. In childhood Datta showed inclination to worship Krishna. His religious fervour was accentuated by his visits to a hermitage near his home when he interacted with monks of different orders. He was a vegetarian and had a strict resolution of not to eat any non-vegetarian food; this resolve went to the extreme extent when he even walked out of a relative's house when he was 10 years old, where they had cooked a non-vegetarian meal and were forcing him to eat it.

Soon after, Nrisimha Prasad remarried, but, Datta could not adjust with his stepmother and went to live in a relative's house.

Ram continued his education, in spite of several adversities, at the General Assembly's Institution (now Scottish Church College). He then joined the Campbell Medical School in Calcutta and graduated.

He married Krishnapreyashi and during his marriage Vivekananda was the best man as they had the best of filial bonding.

== Career ==
After his graduation, Ram joined as an assistant to the Government Quinine Examiner. Once his financial position improved he purchased a house in the central Calcutta.

Ram took deep interest in chemistry while working with an English supervisor. He invented an antidote for blood dysentery from an extract of an indigenous medicinal plant, which got the seal of approval from the government. Leading doctors started prescribing it, and he became famous, and as a result he was appointed a member of the Chemist Association of England. He was then elevated to the post of Government Chemical Examiner. He also started teaching to the military medical students at the Calcutta Medical College.

He also started teaching modern science which made him an atheist, and he used to say "In those days we did not believe in God. We considered that everything happens, changes, or dissolves by the force of nature. We were rank materialists, and we held the view that eating, sleeping, and creature comforts were the summum bommum of life." He was also a good debater on subjects of God and religion and proved his atheistic views, and this attitude continued for five years.

Then his young daughter died suddenly, which plunged him in immense grief and self-reflection and attitude towards God. He tried to look for solace in the Brahmo, Christian, and Hindu religious faiths, but his "The great inquiry" of God did not seem to end. He then, on 13 November 1879, visited Ramakrishna for the first time at Dakshineshwar along with his friend Gopal Chandra Mittra and Manomohan Mittra, a cousin. This was the turning point in his life and he thereafter became a staunch devotee of Ramakrishna to the extent that he considered him as an Avatar of God and started propagating his message through lectures in later years. Ramakrishna visited Ram's house on 2 June 1886 which was a full moon day of the month of Vaisakh according to Bengali calendar, which became a festival day for Ram as he felt blessed on this occasion.

== Spiritual life ==
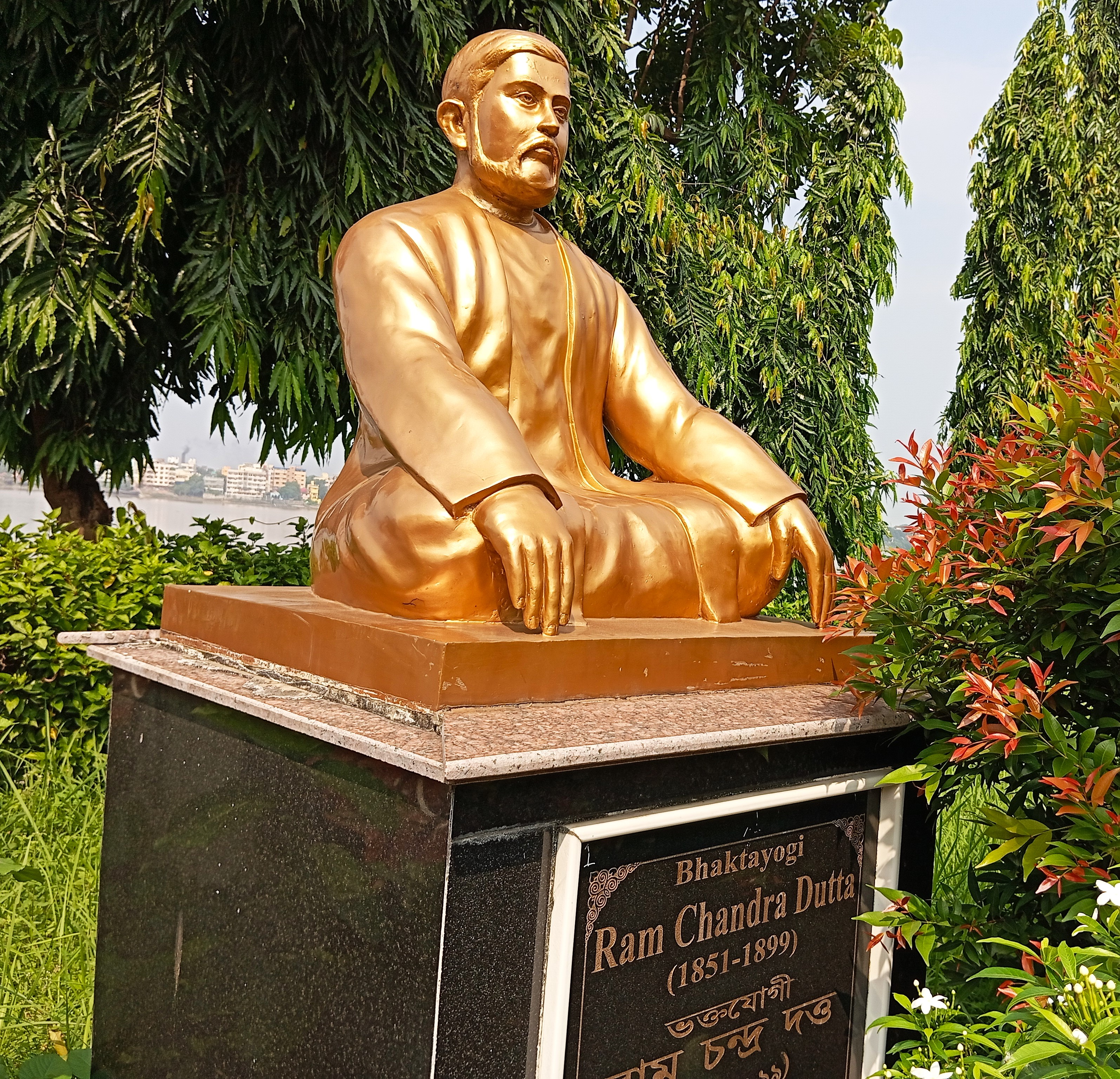
Statue of Ram Chandra Datta, Dakshineswar Kali Temple complex, North 24 Parganas, West Bengal, India

Ram Chandra Datta was a householder disciple of Ramakrishna, the Master. His dedication and love for the Master was obsessively evident, that he vehemently asserted that any place visited by the master was holy, including the coach and the coachman which carried him around.

During 1882-86 there were two groups of disciples of Ramakrishna - The "Householder Group" (married group) to which Ram Chandra Datta belonged, and the "Renouncer Group" to which his cousin Narendra Nath Datta (who later became Swami Vivekananda) belonged and there was a cultural conflict between these two groups. This was brought out by Datta in his book Kathamrata when he stated : "He (Ramakrishna) did not talk about the renouncer disciples in the presence of the householder disciples, and he did not talk about the householder disciples in the presence of the renouncer disciples. But sometimes he would criticize both groups when both were present. They would chastise one another. In this way, there was a feeling of hostility (virabhava) between these two groups."

Ramachandra's devotion to the master was so deep-rooted that after Ramakrishna's death on 16 August 1886 at the Cossipore garden house, after he was cremated on the bank of the Ganga his ashes were collected in an urn, taken from Casipore burning ghat, and kept initially on Ramakrishna's bed. At that time, Vivekananda tried to pacify the grieving disciples by narrating Ramakrishna's life events of mercy. Ramachandra wished to keep the urn of ashes in his Kankurgachi house but Vivekananda's fellow boys played a trick on him, with the consent of Vivekananda, and transferred more than half the ashes to another urn and handed over the original urn to Ramachandra who then kept it in his house on the Krishnajanmashtami day, on 23 August, at Kankurgachi Yogodyana

His devotion to Ramakrishna was so intense that he built a temple, consecrating the Master's relics. He not only offered worship here but also vehemently propagated that Ramakrishna was an incarnation of god, an Avatar. With his gift of spiritual knowledge that he had acquired under the Master, he turned an "evangelist" and he delivered 18 public lectures between 1893 and 1897 at the Star, City, and Minerva Theaters in Calcutta extolling Sri Ramakrishna's life and teachings. His first lecture titled "Is Ramakrishna Paramahamsa an Avatar?" was delivered on a Good Friday in 1893.

Following this he devoted himself to frugal living and made it a ritual to offer worship at the Kankurgachi Yogodyana every day commuting from his Simla home where he lived with his wife and children. In his official life, he exercised utmost discipline in his dealings with the public and suppliers that he refused to accept any kind of favour to overlook any lapses in standards of supplies and delivery.

Even in personal life he became so philosophical that when one of his daughters died of burns on 7 December 1886 his Stoic and endured reaction was "The Lord gave me that daughter, and He took her away. Why should I lament?"

Disciple Include Swami Yogeshwaranandaji, founder of Ramakrishna Mutt in Hyderabad & Bangalore.

== Later life ==
Rama's ascetic life had a telling effect on his health. In 1898, dysentery compounded his problems of chronic diabetes and carbuncle. He was devoutly attended at his Simla home by his wife, friends, and disciples.

His health condition further deteriorated with heart disease and chronic asthma, and he died on 17 January 1899. His relics are consecrated at Ramakrishna Math(Yogodyan), which is located near Kankurgachhi, adjoining the Sri Ramakrishna's temple according to his last wish, "When I die please bury a little of the ashes of my body at the entrance to Yogodyan. Whoever enters this place will walk over my head, and thus I shall get the touch of the Master’s devotees’ feet forever."

== Relationship with Swami Vivekananda ==
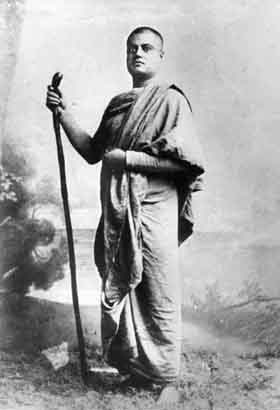
Ram Chandra Datta was a relative of Swami Vivekananda and persuaded him to go to Dakshineswar and meet Ramakrishna.

Ram Chandra was the nephew of Bhuvaneswari Devi, mother of Narendranath Datta. He was twelve years older than Narendranath, but, Bhuvaneswari used to consider him as her another son. Mahendranath Datta, younger brother Narendranath, told, in their childhood they used to think that Ram Chandra was their elder brother.

In November 1881, Surendra Mitra's house was the venue of meetings where Ramakrishna was happy to be present and one of his householder disciples present on this occasion was Ram Chandra Datta along with his 16-year-old cousin Narendra Nath Datta who was still a student and he used to sing at such gatherings. Ramakrishna liked the youngster’s singing and he asked Ram Chandra and Surendra to bring the youngster to his Dakshineswar abode. He was so anxious to meet the young Narendra that he also directly asked Narendra to come and meet him. He was so enamored of Narendra and the effect was so profound which made him cry for six months till Narendra met him. But Narendra took time to meet him as he thought Ramakrishna was a "monomaniac".

In 1898, when Ram Chandra was seriously ill, Swami Vivekananda, after returning from the Western countries, visited Ram Chandra to inquire about his cousin's health. At that time Vivekananda even helped him to wear his slippers to go to the toilet as there was no body else in the room. Ram was so touched by this visit and kind gesture that his eyes watered and he emotionally stated: "Bille (Swami Vivekananda’s family nickname), I thought that after travelling to America and becoming famous you would have forgotten us. But now I see that you are my same little brother Bille."

== Biographical works ==
In May 1885, Ram's compilation of some of Sri Ramakrishna's important teachings was not published immediately as Ramakrishna advised him to delay its publishing as he said "Do not publish my biography now. If you do, my body will not last long." Ram complied and later wrote the first biography titled "Sri Sri Ramakrishna Paramhansadever Jivanvrittanta" which he subsequently expanded in to "Tattva-Prakashika" (The Teachings of Sri Ramakrishna). At this time he also started publishing a Bengali magazine.

In 1890, Ram Chandra wrote the biography of saint Ramakrishna Paramahamsa's Life and Teachings in which he has used the expression guhya katha meaning "secret talk" attributed to the saint himself which pertained to secret tantric revelations.

Jivanavrrtanta was another book that he wrote. Vivekananda had even threatened to take Ram Chandra to court if he attributed to his name in this book, which was known by the epithet "bosh and rot".
