= Swami Atmajnanananda =

Monk

- Occupations: Monk; writer

Swami Atmajnanananda (also written Svāmī Ātmajñānānanda, born Stuart Elkman) is a swami (monk) of the Ramakrishna Order, which he joined in 1981. He has a Ph.D. in oriental studies from the University of Pennsylvania. He is currently resident minister at the Vedanta Center of Greater Washington, DC, in Silver Spring, Maryland, USA.

He authored Jiva Gosvamin's Tattvasandarbha: A Study on the Philosophical and Sectarian Development of the Gaudiya Vaisnava Movement, published by Motilal Banarsidass in 1986 under his pre-monastic name, Stuart Elkman.

Atmajnanananda was a significant critic of Jeffrey Kripal's book Kali's Child.
