= Narasingha Sil =

American historian (born 1937)

Narasingha Prosad "Ram" Sil (born 1937 in Calcutta, Bengal Presidency) is an Indian-born American historian. He was professor of European and English history at Western Oregon University, Monmouth, Oregon.

== Biography ==
Ram is primarily trained in the history of Tudor England and has published eleven books, seventy-four refereed journal articles, five review essays, six articles in anthologies, fifty-two encyclopedia articles in British, European, African, Chinese, and Indian history. Additionally, he published sixty-five book-reviews, forty of them for The Statesman, Kolkata by invitation during 1992–99). Notably, Sil was invited to contribute articles to the Encyclopedia of Religion (2nd edition), Oxford Dictionary of National Biography (New DNB), and "Oxford Bibliography Online" (OBE): Hinduism. Sil has received campus recognition for scholarship twice (1992 and 2004. He retired as professor emeritus in July 2011. Prior to joining Western in January 1987, Sil served University of Benin, Nigeria as associate professor of history from March 1980 to December 1986, University of Oregon as assistant professor from fall 1978 to winter 1980. During 1967–71 he also taught in Comprehensive Higher Secondary Schools in Dessie and Addis Ababa, Ethiopia. He worked in Vidyasagar College, Kolkata and Chandernagore Government College, West Bengal, India as lecturer in history during 1962–64.

== Books ==
- Rabindra Miscellany: Critical Essays on Rabindranath Tagore’s Thoughts on Love, Life, Gender, God, and Patriotism. Studia Orientalia Monograpica No. 5. Bratislava, Slovakia: Slovak Academy of Science, 2015.
- Problem Child of Renascent Bengal: The Babu of Colonial Calcutta. Kolkata: K.P. Bagchi & Company, 2017.
- The Life of Sharatchandra Chattopadhyay: Drifter and Dreamer. Madison/Lanham: Fairleigh Dickinson University Press/Rowman & Littlefield, 2012.
- Crazy in Love of God: Ramakrishna’s Caritas Divina. Selinsgrove/Cranbury: Susquehanna University Press/Associated University Presses, 2009.
- Divine Dowager: Life and Teachings of Saradamani the Holy Mother. Selinsgrove/Cranbury: Susquehanna University Press/Associated University Presses, 2003.
- Tudor Placemen and Statesmen: Select Case Histories. Madison, NJ: Fairleigh Dickinson University Press/Associated University Presses, 2001.
- Ramakrishna Revisited: A New Biography. Lanham: University Press of America, 1998.
- Swami Vivekananda: A Reassessment. Selinsgrove: Susquehanna University Press/Cranbury: Associated Universities Presses, 1997.
- William Lord Herbert of Pembroke (c. 1507–1570): Politique and Patriot. 1988. Revised second ed. Lewiston: Edwin Mellen Press, 1992.
- Rāmakṛṣṇa Paramahaṁsa: A Psychological Profile. Leiden: E.J. Brill, 1991.
- Kauṭilya’s Arthaśastra: A Comparative Study. 1985. Revised second ed. New York/Berne: Peter Lang Publishing, Inc., 1989.
