= Amiya Prosad Sen =

Indian historian (born 1952)

Amiya P. Sen
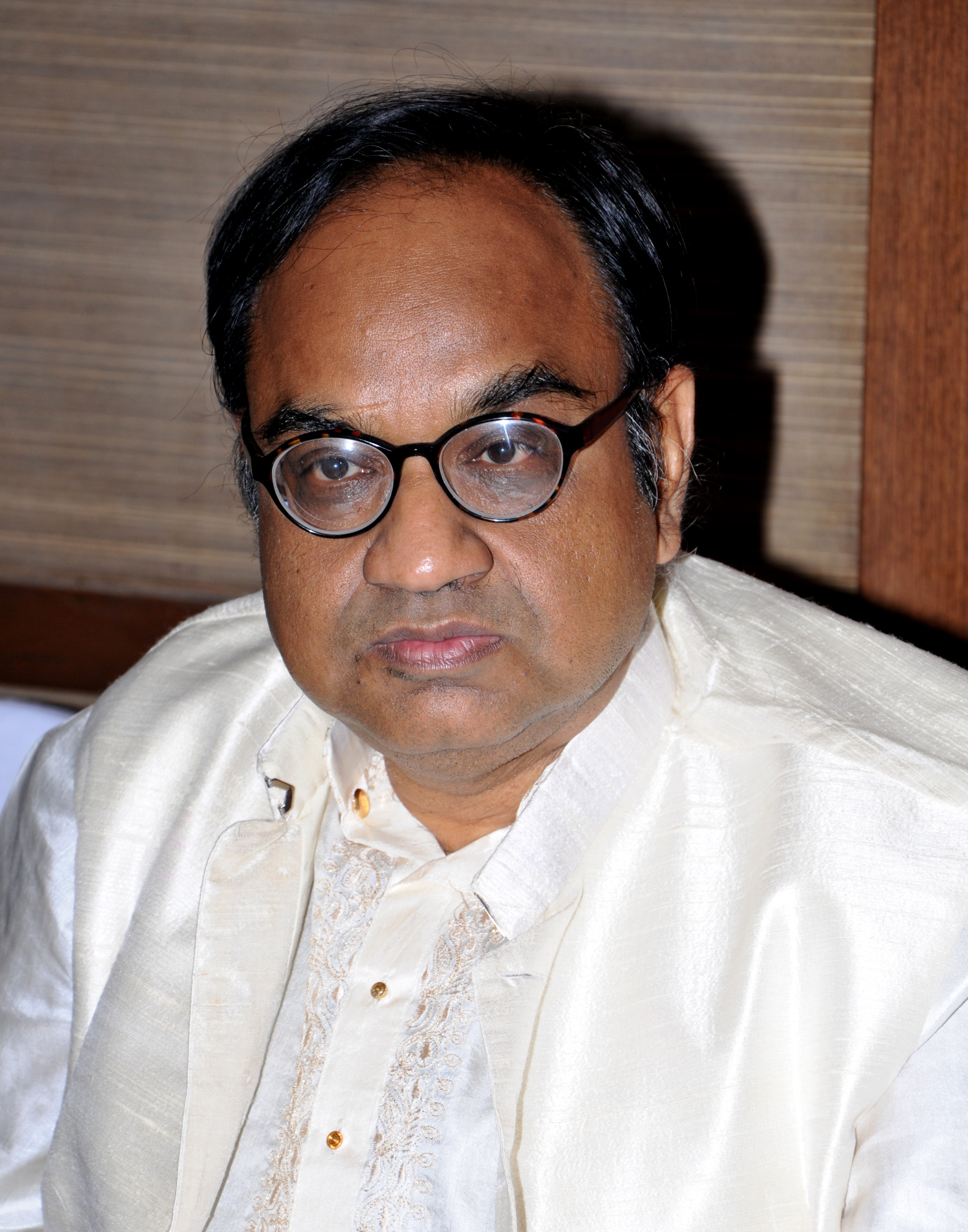
- Born: 1952 (age 73–74)
- Education: St. Stephen's College, Delhi
- Occupations: Professor, Author
- Known for: Heinrich Zimmer Chair at the South Asia Institute, Heidelberg University

Amiya Prosad Sen (born 1952) is a historian with an interest in the intellectual and cultural history of modern India. Currently he is Sivadasani Fellow at the Oxford Centre for Hindu Studies, Oxford (UK). He was previously the Heinrich Zimmer Chair at the South Asia Institute, Heidelberg University. He has served as Professor of Modern Indian History at Jamia Millia Islamia, New Delhi. He has been Agatha Harrison Fellow to the University of Oxford and Visiting Fellow to the Indian Institute of Advanced Study, Shimla, and the Centre for Contemporary Studies, Nehru Memorial Museum & Library, New Delhi. During 2007–08, he was Tagore professor at Vishwa Bharati, Shantiniketan.

Sen took his bachelor's and master's degrees in history from St. Stephen's College, Delhi and also pursued his PhD there. After a brief career in Indian Civil Services, he took up teaching and research in 1984.

== Bibliography ==
1. Sen, Amiya P: Hindu Revivalism in Bengal, Some Essays in Interpretation. 1872-1905. Delhi Oxford University Press. 1993
2. Sen, Amiya P: Swami Vivekananda. Delhi. Oxford University Press. 2000
3. Sen, Amiya P: “Sri Ramakrishna and Middle Class Religion in Late Nineteenth Century Bengal. Exploring Some New Paradigms of Understanding” in Biswamoy Pati ed. Issues in Modern Indian History. For Sumit Sarkar. Bombay. Popular Prakashan. 2000.
4. Sen, Amiya P: Three Essays on Sri Ramakrishna and His Times. Shimla, IIAS. 2001
5. Sen, Amiya P: Introduction to Bankimchandra Chattopadhyay: Dharmatattwa. Translated by Apratim Ray. Delhi. Oxford University Press. 2003.
6. Sen, Amiya P ed. Social and Religious Reform. The Hindus of British India. Delhi. Oxford University Press. 2003
7. Sen, Amiya P: The Indispensable Vivekananda. An Anthology for Our Times. Ranikhet. Permanent Black. 2006.
8. Sen, Amiya P: Bankimchandra Chattopadhyay. An Intellectual Biography. Delhi. Oxford University Press. 2008.
9. Sen, Amiya P.|: His Words: The Preaching and Parables of Ramakrishna Paramahamsa Delhi. Penguin Viking. 2010.
10. Sen, Amiya P.: Ramakrishna Paramahamsa: The Sadhaka of Dakshineswar. Delhi. Penguin Viking. 2010.
11. Sen, Amiya P. ed. Bankim's Hinduism. An Anthology of Writings by Bankimchandra Chattopadhyay. Ranikhet. Permanent Black. 2011
12. Sen, Amiya P: Rammohun Roy. A Critical Biography. Delhi. Penguin Viking. 2012.
13. Sen, Amiya P: Religion and Rabindranath Tagore. Select Discourses, Addresses and Letters in Translation. Delhi. Oxford University Press.2014.
14. Sen, Amiya P :"Culture and Community Building . Select Discourses from Early Colonial Bengal" in Sabyasachi Bhattacharya ed. Indian Cultural Unity: A Reappraisal. Kolkata. Ramakrishna Mission Institute of Culture. 2014.
15. Sen, Amiya P: "Hindu Reform Movements in British India" in Key Concepts in Modern Indian Studies. Eds Gita Dharampal-Frick, Monika Kirloskar Steinbach, Rachel Dwyer, Jahanavy Phalkey. New Delhi. Oxford University Press. 2015.
16. Sen, Amiya P: "Hinduism and the Problem of Self-Actualisation in the Colonial Era: Critical Reflections". Heinrich Zimmer Lecture for 2015. South Asia Institute Papers. Heidelberg University.
17. Sen, Amiya P: "Debates within Colonial Hinduism" in Brian A. Hatcher ed. Hinduism in the Modern World. New York & London. Routledge. 2015.
18. Sen, Amiya P: "Swami Vivekananda's Vision of India" in Swami Vivekananda's Ideas and our Times. A Retrospect on his 150th Birth Anniversary. A Commemorative Volume. ed. by Sandipan Sen et al. Ramakrishna Vidyamandira, Howrah. 2015
19. Sen, Amiya P: An Idealist in India. Selected Writings and Speeches of Sister Nivedita. Delhi. Primus Books. 2016.
20. Sen, Amiya P: "Bankimchandra Chattopadhyay and the Vaishnava Revival in Bengal" in In Quest of the Historian's Craft. Essays in Honour of Professor B.B. Chaudhuri. Part II. Edited by Arun Bandopadhyay and Sanjukta Das Gupta. Delhi. Manohar. 2017.
21. Sen, Amiya P: "A Hindu Conservative Negotiates Modernity. Chandranath Basu (1844-1910) and Reflections on the Self and Culture in Colonial Bengal". in Rafael Klober and Manu Ludwig eds. Her Story. Historical Scholarship between South Asia and Europe. Festscrift in Honour of Gita Dharampal Frick. Heidelberg. Cross Asia Books. 2018.
22. Sen, Amiya P: Chaitanya. A Life and Legacy. Delhi. Oxford University Press. 2019.
23. Sen, Amiya P: "Theorising Bengal Vaishnavism. Bipinchandra Pal and New Perspectives on Religious Life and Culture" in Ferdinando Sardella& Lucian Wong eds. The Legacy of Vaishnavism in Colonial Bengal. London & New York. Routledge. 2020, pp. 33–56
24. Sen, Amiya P: "Hinduism under Interpretative Stress. A View from Nineteenth Century Bengal". in Sabyasachi Bhattacahrya Ed. Comprehensive History of Modern Bengal. 1700-1950. Delhi. Primus Publications. Vol. 2. 2019, pp. 213–70.
25. Amiya P. Sen ed. Special Issue on Hinduism: "Historical Perspectives and Contemporary Developments" Religions 12, 85 (2021) ISSN 2077-1444
26. Amiya P. Sen : "Japan in India's Xenology: Negotiating Modernity, Culture and Cosmopolitanism in colonial Bengal in Madhu Bhalla ed. Culture as Power. Buddhist Heritage and Indo Japanese Dialogue. London and New York. Routledge. South Asia Edition. 2021
27. Amiya P. Sen: Vidyasagar. Reflections on a Notable Life. Delhi. Orient Black Swan. 2021
28. Amiya P. Sen: "The Idea of Social Reform and Its Critique among Hindus of Nineteenth Century India " in Development of Modern Indian Thought and the Social Sciences ed. Sabyasachi Bhattacharya. Centre for Studies in civilizations Vol.X, Part 5. Delhi.2007. ISBN 978-019-568967-9, pp. 107–38
29. Amiya P. Sen: "Sarada Devi. Holiness, Charisma and Iconic Motherhood". Delhi. Niyogi Books. 2022
30. Amiya P. Sen: "Hindutva before Hindutva. Selected Writings and Discourses of Chandranath Basu in translation". London & New York. Routledge. 2025. ISBN 978-1-032-36467-4
31. Amiya P. Sen: "Colonial Hinduism. Mandala & Oxford Centre for Hindu Studies", Oxford. San Rafael. 2025. ISBN 979-8-88762-075-6
32. Amiya P. Sen: "Foreword to Achintya Kumar Dutta ed. Explorations in Colonial Bengal. Essays on Religion, Society and Culture". Hyderabad. Orient BlackSwan. 2023. ISBN 978-93-5442-513-4
