= Swami Medhananda =

Indian author and philosopher

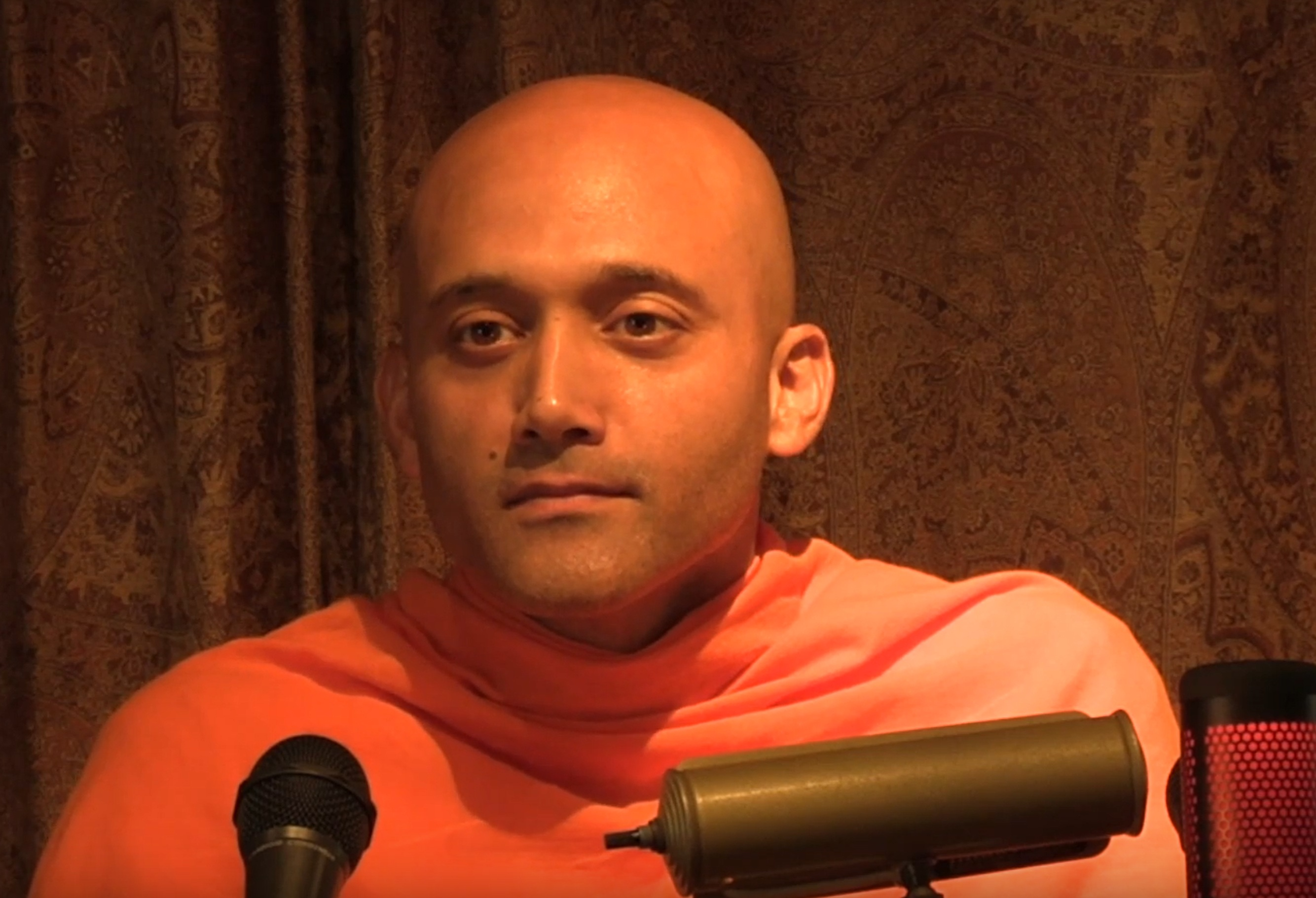
- Swami Medhananda in 2022
- Born: 1980 (age 45–46); Massachusetts, United States
- Occupations: Monk of the Ramakrishna Order, Hindu Chaplain at UCLA and USC
- Known for: Author and Philosopher
- Website: www.swamimedhananda.com

Swami Medhananda (also known as Ayon Maharaj and formerly known as Ayon Roy) is an Indian-American author, philosopher, and monk of the Ramakrishna Order. He has written books on Vedanta Philosophy, several of which were published by Oxford University Press and Cambridge University Press. He is fluent in English, German, and Bengali, and he has reading proficiency in Sanskrit, Pāli, and French.

He frequently gives lectures at the Hollywood and Santa Barbara Vedanta Temples, the Trabuco Ramakrishna Monastery, and the San Diego Vedanta Center. He has also given guest lectures at Harvard, UCLA, Mahamakut Buddhist University, Loyola Marymount University, University of Heidelberg, Boston College, University of Vienna, Ohio State University, Oxford University, University of Münster, St. Xavier’s College, Kolkata, and Princeton University.

== Early life and education ==
Medhananda was born and raised in the greater Boston area. From 2000 to 2001, he was a visiting student at Magdalen College, University of Oxford. In 2002, he received a Bachelor of Arts in English from the University of California, Berkeley, graduating summa cum laude with highest honors. He received a PhD in English in 2009. He was also a Fulbright Scholar at Humboldt University of Berlin from 2006–2007, where he conducted doctoral research on German aesthetics. His revised doctoral dissertation was published as his first book, entitled The Dialectics of Aesthetic Agency: Revaluating German Aesthetics from Kant to Adorno.

== Career ==
Medhananda was the Associate Professor and Head of the Philosophy program from 2010 to 2021 at the Ramakrishna Mission Vivekananda Educational and Research Institute in Belur Math, West Bengal. He is currently serving as Senior Research Fellow in Philosophy at the Vedanta Society of Southern California in Hollywood. He is the Hindu Chaplain at University of California Los Angeles and University of Southern California. He is researching and writing on the global philosophy of religion, epistemology of mystical experience, Indian scriptural hermeneutics, cosmopsychism, and Vedantic philosophical traditions, with special focus on the philosophies of Sri Ramakrishna, Swami Vivekananda, and Sri Aurobindo.

== Scholarly works ==
=== Books ===
- Maharaj, Ayon (2013-01-03). The Dialectics of Aesthetic Agency: Revaluating German Aesthetics from Kant to Adorno. Bloomsbury Publishing. ISBN 978-1-4411-5203-9.
- Maharaj, Ayon (2018-10-08). Infinite Paths to Infinite Reality: Sri Ramakrishna and Cross-Cultural Philosophy of Religion. Oxford University Press. ISBN 978-0-19-086824-6.
- Maharaj, Ayon (2020-05-28). The Bloomsbury Research Handbook of Vedanta. Bloomsbury Publishing. ISBN 978-1-350-06325-9.
- Medhananda, Swami (2021-11-18). Swami Vivekananda's Vedāntic Cosmopolitanism. Oxford University Press. ISBN 978-0-19-762448-7.
- Medhananda, Swami (2025-08-08). Karma and Rebirth in Hinduism. Cambridge University Press. ISBN 978-1-00-946115-3.

=== Articles ===
- Medhananda, Swami. “Harmonizing the Personal God with the Impersonal Brahman: Sri Ramakrishna’s Vijñāna Vedānta in Dialogue with Gauḍīya Vaiṣṇavism,” in Vaiṣṇava Concepts of God: Philosophical Perspectives, eds. Alan Herbert, Ricardo Sylvestre, and Benedikt Paul Göcke (London: Routledge, 2024): 184–200.
- Medhananda, Swami. “From Good to God: Swami Vivekananda’s Vedāntic Virtue Ethics,” International Journal of Hindu Studies 27.1 (April 2023): 67–96.
- Medhananda, Swami. “Eating Sugar, Becoming Sugar, Both, or Neither? Eschatology and Religious Pluralism in the Thought of John Hick, Sri Ramakrishna, and S. Mark Heim,” in John Hick’s Religious Pluralism in Global Perspective, ed. Sharada Sugirtharajah (Palgrave Macmillan, 2023), 157–178.
- Medhananda, Swami. “Panentheism and the ‘Most Nonsensical Superstition’ of Polytheism: A Critical Examination of K.C.F. Krause’s Reception of Vedānta and Hindu Religion,” European Journal for Philosophy of Religion 14.2 (2022): 187–208.
- Medhananda, Swami. “An Integral Advaitic theodicy of spiritual evolution: karma, rebirth, universal salvation, and mystical panentheism,” Religious Studies 59 (2023), pp. 67–81.
- Medhananda, Swami. “The Playful Self-Involution of Divine Consciousness: Sri Aurobindo’s Evolutionary Cosmopsychism and His Response to the Individuation Problem,” The Monist 105 (2022): 92–109.
- Medhananda, Swami. “‘A Great Adventure of the Soul’: Sri Aurobindo’s Vedāntic Theodicy of Spiritual Evolution,” International Journal of Hindu Studies 25.3 (December 2021): 229–257.
- Medhananda, Swami. “Continuing the Philosophical Conversation on Śrī Rāmak ṛṣṇa—A Response [to the Book Symposium on Infinite Paths to Infinite Reality],” International Journal of Hindu Studies 25.1–2 (2021), 141–64.
- Medhananda, Swami. “Cutting the Knot of the World Problem: Sri Aurobindo’s Experiential and Philosophical Critique of Advaita Vedānta,” Religions 12.9 (2021), 1–21.
- Medhananda, Swami. “Why Sri Aurobindo’s Hermeneutics Still Matters: Philology and the Transformative Possibilities of Scripture,” Religions 12.7 (2021), 1–14.
- Medhananda, Swami. “Asminnasya ca tad yogaṃ śāsti: Swami Vivekananda’s Interpretation of Brahmasūtra 1.1.19 as a Hermeneutic Basis for Samanvayī Vedānta,” in Rita 4Sherma, ed., Vivekananda: His Life, Legacy, and Liberative Ethics (Rowman & Littlefield, 2021), 11–32.
- Medhananda, Swami. “Swami Vivekananda’s Doctrine of the ‘Science of Religion’ and its Contemporary Relevance,” Interreligious Insight 18.2 (2020), 12–17.
- Medhananda, Swami. “Mysticism without the Mustikos?: Some Reflections on Stephen Palmquist’s Mystical Kant,” Kantian Review (Cambridge University Press) 26.1 (2020), 105–111.
- Medhananda, Swami. “Was Swami Vivekananda a Hindu Supremacist? Revisiting a Long-Standing Debate,” Religions 11.7 (2020), 1-28.
- Maharaj, Ayon. “Śiva jñāne jīver sevā: Reexamining Swami Vivekananda’s Practical Vedānta in the Light of Sri Ramakrishna,” Journal of Dharma Studies 2 (2020), 175-87.
- Maharaj, Ayon. “Panentheistic Cosmopsychism: Swami Vivekananda’s Sāṃkhya-Vedāntic Solution to the Hard Problem of Consciousness,” in Godehard Brüntrup, Ludwig Jaskolla, and Benedikt Paul Göcke, eds., Panentheism and Panpsychism: Philosophy of Religion Meets Philosophy of Mind (Paderborn: Brill Mentis, 2020), 273-301.
- Maharaj, Ayon. “Sarvamukti: Sarvepalli Radhakrishnan’s Aporetic Metaphysics of Collective Salvation,” Philosophy East and West 70.1 (January 2020), 136-54.
- Maharaj, Ayon. “Seeing Oneness Everywhere: Sri Aurobindo’s Mystico-Immanent Interpretation of the Īśā Upaniṣad,” in Ayon Maharaj, ed., The Bloomsbury Research Handbook of Vedānta (London: Bloomsbury, 2020), 309-340.
- Maharaj, Ayon. “‘Infinite Paths, Infinite Doctrines’: Perry Schmidt-Leukel’s Fractal Approach to Religious Diversity from the Standpoint of the Ramakrishna-Vivekananda Tradition,” in Paul Knitter and Alan Race, eds., New Paths for Interreligious Theology: Perry Schmidt-Leukel’s Fractal Interpretation of Religious Diversity (Maryknoll, NY: Orbis, 2019), 100-114.
- Maharaj, Ayon. “Hard Theological Determinism and the Illusion of Free Will: Sri Ramakrishna Meets Lord Kames, Saul Smilansky, and Derk Pereboom,” Journal of World Philosophies 3.2 (Winter 2018), pp. 24–48.
- Maharaj, Ayon. “Swami Vivekananda’s Vedāntic Critique of Schopenhauer’s Doctrine of the Will,” Philosophy East and West 67.4 (October 2017), pp. 1191–1221.
- Maharaj, Ayon. “The Challenge of the Oceanic Feeling: Romain Rolland’s Mystical Critique of Psychoanalysis and His Call for a ‘New Science of the Mind,’” History of European Ideas 43.5 (2017), pp. 474-493.
- Maharaj, Ayon. “Kant on the Epistemology of Indirect Mystical Experience,” Sophia 56.2 (June 2017), pp. 311–336.
- Maharaj, Ayon. “‘God Is Infinite, and the Paths to God Are Infinite’: A Reconstruction and Defense of Sri Ramakrishna’s Vijñāna-Based Model of Religious Pluralism,” Journal of Religion 97.2 (April 2017), pp. 181-213.
- Maharaj, Ayon. “Śrī Rāmakṛṣṇa’s Philosophy of Vijñāna Vedānta,” International Journal of Hindu Studies 21.1 (2017), pp. 25–54.
- Maharaj, Ayon. “Toward a New Hermeneutics of the Bhagavad Gītā: Sri Ramakrishna, Sri Aurobindo, and the Secret of Vijñāna,” Philosophy East and West 65.4 (October 2015), pp. 1209–1233.
- Maharaj, Ayon. “Śrī Harṣa contra Hegel: Monism, Skeptical Method, and the Limits of Reason,” Philosophy East and West 64.1 (January 2014), pp. 82–108.
- Maharaj, Ayon. “Yogic Mindfulness: Hariharānanda Āraṇya’s Quasi-Buddhistic Interpretation of Sṃrti in Patañjali’s Yogasūtra I.20,” Journal of Indian Philosophy 41 (2013), pp. 57–78.
- Maharaj, Ayon. “Why Poetry Matters: The Transpersonal Force of Lyric Experience in Ezra Pound’s The Pisan Cantos,” Arizona Quarterly 66.4 (Winter 2010), pp. 71–92.
- Roy, Ayon. “Hegel contra Schlegel; Kierkegaard contra de Man,” PMLA 124.1 (January 2009), pp. 107–126.
- Roy, Ayon. “The Specter of Hegel in Coleridge’s Biographia Literaria,” Journal of the History of Ideas 68.2 (April 2007), pp. 279–304.
- Roy, Ayon. “Postmodern Convexity and Hegelian Dialectics in Ashbery’s ‘Self-Portrait in a Convex Mirror,’” Gingko Tree Review 4.1 (2007), pp. 25-46.
- Roy, Ayon. “In seinem Anderen bei sich selbst zu sein: Toward a Recuperation of Hegel’s Metaphysics of Agency,” Epoché: A Journal for the History of Philosophy 11.1 (Fall 2006), pp. 225–255.
- Roy, Ayon. “From Deconstruction to Decreation: Wallace Stevens’ Notes toward a Poetics of Nobility,” Wallace Stevens Journal 29.2 (Fall 2005), pp. 249–262.
