= Mahendranath Gupta =

Indian yogi (1854–1932)

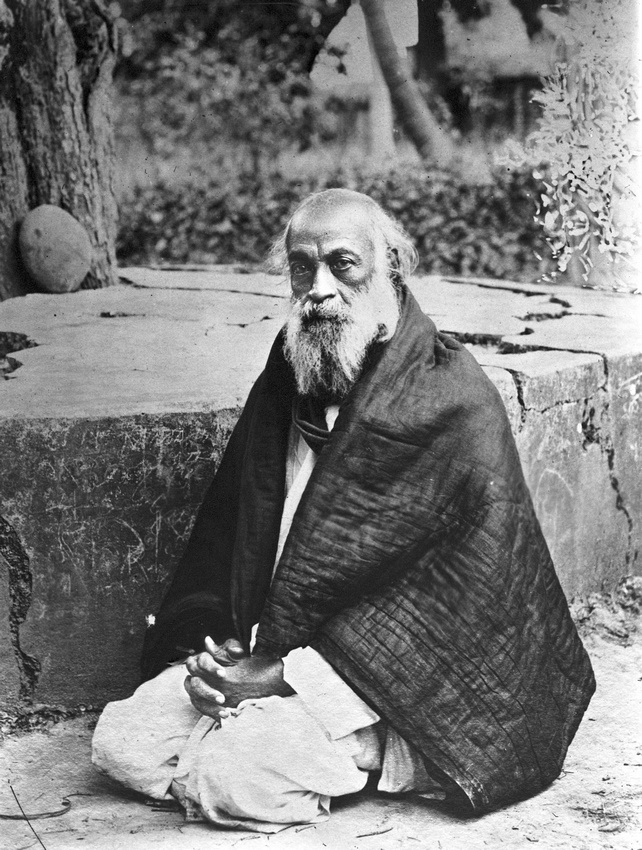
- Born: 14 July 1854; Calcutta, Bengal Presidency, Company Raj (present-day Kolkata, West Bengal, India)
- Died: 4 June 1932 (aged 77); Calcutta, Bengal Presidency, British India (present-day Kolkata, West Bengal, India)
- Known for: Author of Sri Sri Ramakrishna Kathamrita, teacher of Paramahansa Yogananda

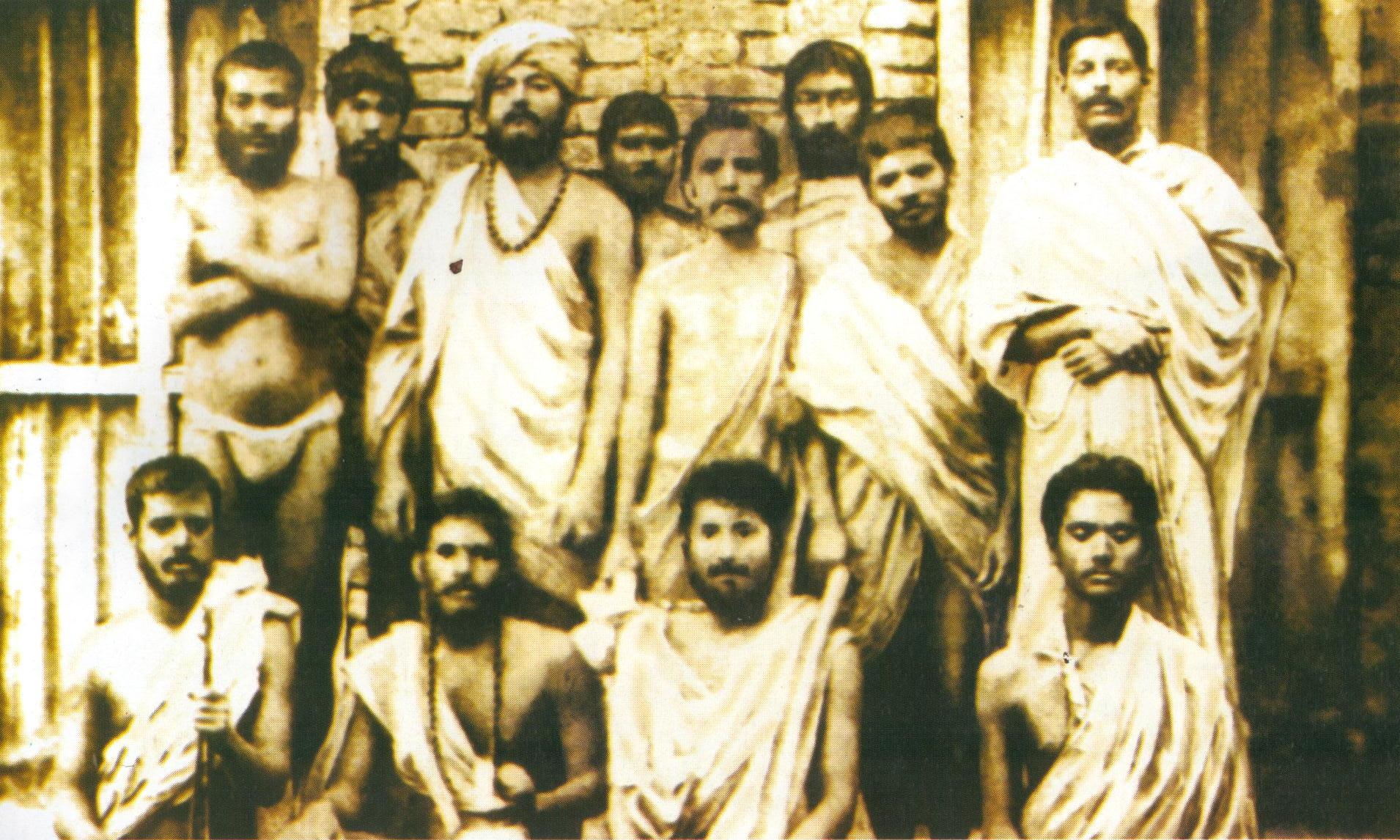
Group photo taken on 30 January 1887 In Baranagar Math, Kolkata. Standing: (l–r) ) Swami Shivananda, Swami Ramakrishnananda, Swami Vivekananda, Randhuni, Debendranath Majumdar, Mahendranath Gupta (Shri M), Swami Trigunatitananda, H.Mustafi Sitting: (l–r) Swami Niranjanananda, Swami Saradananda, Hutko Gopal, Swami Abhedananda

Mahendranath Gupta (Bengali: মহেন্দ্রনাথ গুপ্ত) (14 July 1854 – 4 June 1932), (also popularly known as Shri M and Master Mahashay), was a disciple of Ramakrishna and a mystic himself. He was the author of Sri Sri Ramakrishna Kathamrita (5 vols.), a Bengali classic; in English, it is known as The Gospel of Sri Ramakrishna. He was also an early teacher to Paramahansa Yogananda, a famous 20th-century yogi, guru and philosopher. In his autobiography, Yogananda noted that Gupta ran a small boys' high school in Kolkata, and he recounted their visits, as they often traveled to the Dakshineshwar Kali Temple together. Having a devotional nature, Gupta worshipped the Divine Mother in the form of Kali, and often reflected the wisdom of his guru Ramakrishna in his daily life and mannerisms. Yogananda reverentially regarded Gupta's spirituality, calling him an "Incarnation of purity" and "the greatest man of humility I ever knew."

== Life ==
=== Birth and education ===
Mahendranath was born to Madhusudan Gupta and Swarnamayi Devi in a Bengali Hindu family of Baidya sub-caste in the Shimuliya (Shimla) locality of Calcutta (now Kolkata) of Bengal Presidency . After elementary education at the Hare School, he attended Presidency College, receiving his B.A. in 1874. Gupta was a gifted student and performed consistently well until 1874 till he graduated from Presidency College. In 1874 he was married to Nikunja Devi, daughter of Thakur Charan Sen and a relative of Keshub Chandra Sen, a Brahmo Samaj leader. After some time working for the government and a merchant house, he began teaching English, Psychology, and Economics at various colleges. Eventually he became headmaster of Ishwar Chandra Vidyasagar's high school, where he was called "Master Mahashay"—just as he was often addressed in Ramakrishna's circle and later by Yogananda.

=== Meetings with Ramakrishna ===
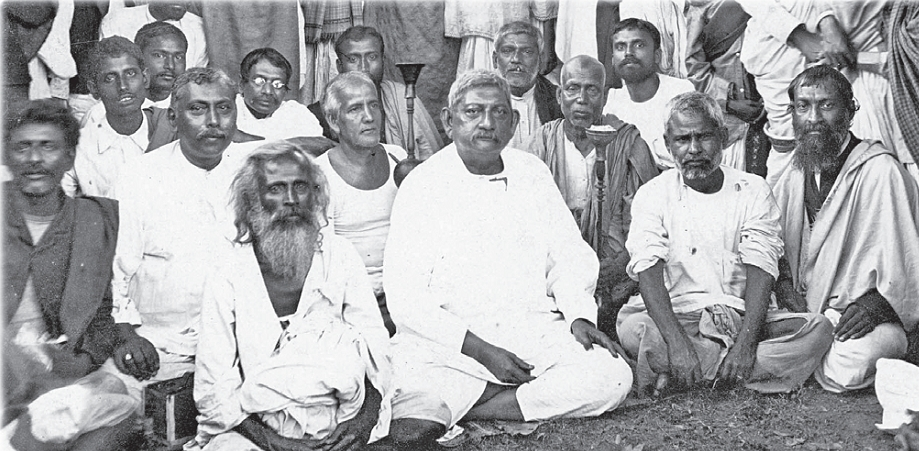
Girish Chandra Ghosh, Swami Adbhutananda, Mahendranath Gupta and other disciples and devotees of Ramakrishna

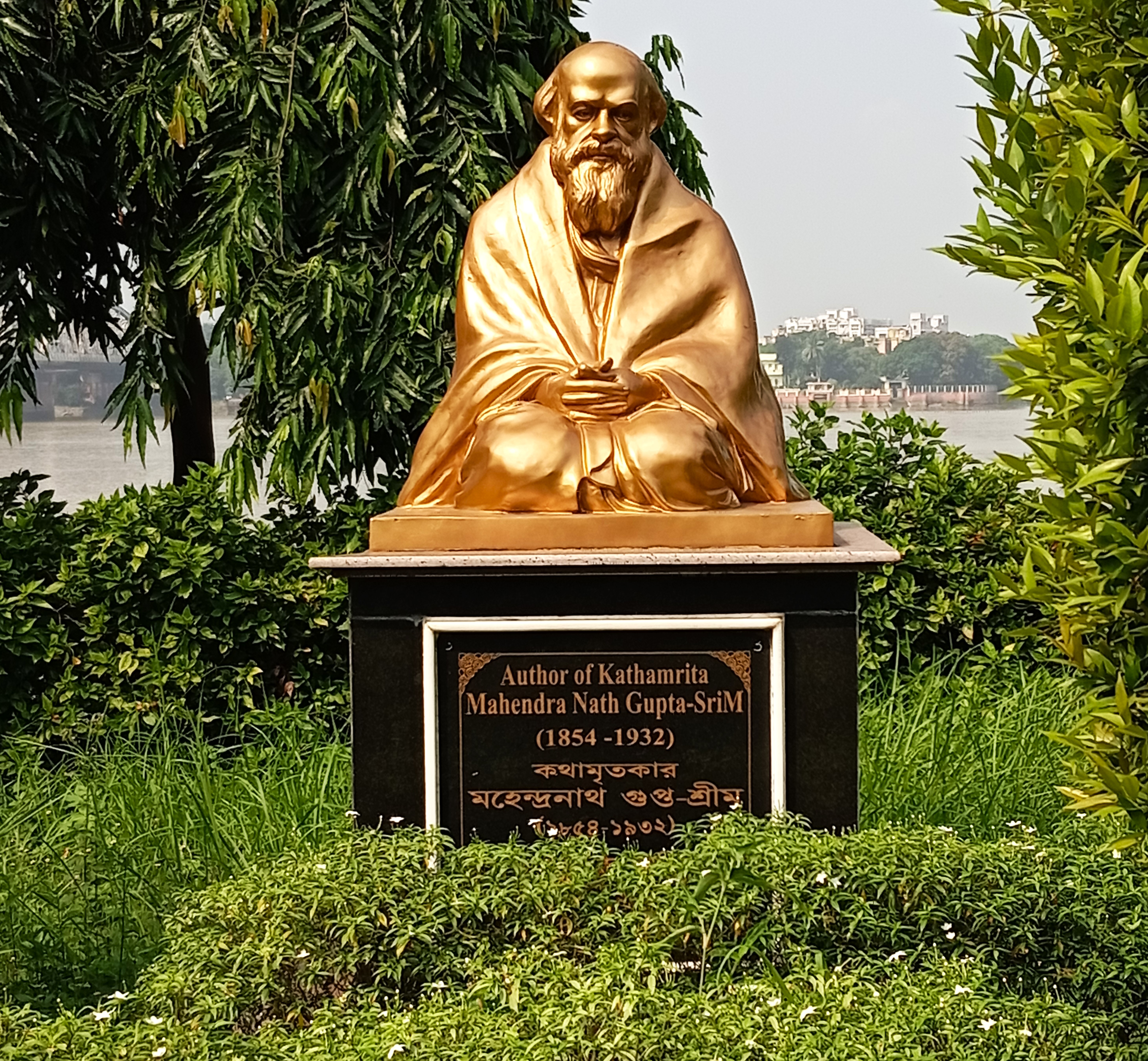
Statue of Mahendranath Gupta (Sri M), Dakshineswar Kali Temple complex, North 24 Parganas, West Bengal, India

As an adult, Mahendranath, like some of the other disciples of Ramakrishna, was connected with the Brahmo Samaj for several years. Mahendranath had lost his mother at a very early age and was experiencing domestic friction in the joint family. As the friction within the joint family increased, Mahendranath decided to commit suicide. At this critical juncture, Mahendranath's nephew took him to the temple garden of Dakshineswar Kali Temple, where Ramakrishna, a mystic and the chief priest of the Kali temple lived. It was here that Gupta met Ramakrishna for the first time and this meeting was a turning point in his life. Years later, when Mahendranath was asked about the greatest day in his life, he said, "the day I had my first darshan of Thakur [Ramakrishna] in February 1882." According to other traditional accounts, Mahendranath related that he may have met Ramakrishna for the first time when he was four years old and became separated from his mother while visiting the Dakshineswar Kali Temple. He began crying, and a blissful and youthful man came up and consoled him. He believed it to be Ramakrishna, who was then a priest at the Kali temple.

=== Sri Sri Ramakrishna Kathamrita ===
Shri M had the habit of maintaining a personal diary since the age of thirteen. M met Sri Ramakrishna in 1882 and, attracted by the latter's teachings, started to maintain a stenographic record of Sri Ramakrishna's conversations and actions in his diary, which finally took the form of a book Sri Sri Ramakrishna Kathamrita. Initially when M began writing the diaries, he had no plans of publication. Regarding his methodology M wrote,

I wrote everything from memory after I returned home. Sometimes I had to keep awake the whole night...Sometimes I would keep on writing the events of one sitting for seven days, recollect the songs that were sung, and the order in which they were sung, and the samadhi and so on...Many a time I did not feel satisfied with my description of the events; I would then immediately plunge myself in deep meditation ...Then the correct image would arise...That is why in spite of the big gap in the physical sense, this story remains so fresh and lifelike in my mind as if it happened just now.

In each of his Kathamrita entries, M records the date, time and place of the conversation. The title Kathamrita, literally "nectarine words" was inspired by verse 10.31.9 from the Vaishnava text, the Bhagavata Purana. Both Sri Ramakrishna's wife, Holy Mother Sarada Devi, and Swami Vivekananda later testified to Mahendranath's faithfulness to Sri Ramakrishna's words. The first four volumes were published in 1902, 1904, 1908 and 1910 respectively and the fifth volume in 1932, delayed because of M's health problems. The Kathamrita contains the conversations of Sri Ramakrishna from 19/26 February 1882 to 24 April 1886, during M's visits. The Kathamrita is regarded as a Bengali classic and revered among the followers as a sacred scripture. Its translations of Kathamrita include works by Swami Nikhilananda (1942), Swami Abhedananda, and Dharma Pal Gupta.

=== Teacher to Paramahansa Yogananda ===
Paramahansa Yogananda, a 20th-century philosopher and a yogi, was a student of Mahendranath Gupta. Mahendranath moved to 50 Amherst Street in Calcutta, where he ran a small boys' high school. It was also formerly Paramahansa Yogananda's family home—a site especially poignant to Yogananda because it was the site of his mother's death. In his Autobiography of a Yogi, Yogananda dedicated an entire chapter to describing his friendship with Mahendranath, whom he referred to as "Master Mahasaya," which was along spiritual rather than academic lines. Yogananda described Mahendranath as having a "silky white beard and large lustrous eyes" and described his personality thus:

"His role in the world was humble, as befitted the greatest man of humility I ever knew. In this Amherst Street house, Master Mahasaya conducted a small high school for boys. No words of chastisement passed his lips; no rule and ferule maintained his discipline. Higher mathematics indeed were taught in these modest classrooms, and a chemistry of love absent from the textbooks. He spread his wisdom by spiritual contagion rather than impermeable precept. Consumed by an unsophisticated passion for the Divine Mother, the saint no more demanded the outward forms of respect than a child."

Yogananda went on to describe several seemingly miraculous experiences with Mahendranath. Later, Yogananda said about him that "I would roll on the ground where he'd walked, so great was my love for him. I felt that even that ground had been sanctified."

=== Later life and death ===
In 1922, M. lived in Mihijam, a town 144 miles from Kolkata, for nine months.

In 1932, when the fifth Volume of Kathamrita was at the printers Mahendranath died at his home, now called Kathamrita Bhavan, located near the Thanthania Kali Temple in Calcutta. Kathamrita Bhavan is a pilgrimage place for followers of Ramakrishna due to numerous visits there by Ramakrishna and Sarada Devi, and several relics associated with their lives.

== Bibliography ==
- Nityatmananda, Swami; D P Gupta (June 1967). "M"--the apostle and the evangelist : a continuation of M's Gospel of Sri Ramakrishna. Rohtak, Sri Ramakrishna—Sri Ma Prakashan. OCLC 49257. (full book is 16 volumes)
- Chetanananda, Swami (1990). Ramakrishna as We Saw Him. Vedanta Society of St. Louis. ISBN 0-916356-65-5.
- Nikhilananda, Swami (June 1985). The Gospel of Sri Ramakrishna. Ramakrishna-Vivekananda Center. ISBN 978-0-911206-01-2.
- Kriyananda, Swami (2004). Conversations with Yogananda. Crystal Clarity Publishers. ISBN 1-56589-202-X.
- Smith, Bardwell Leith (1982). Hinduism: New Essays in the History of Religions. Brill. ISBN 90-04-06788-4.
- Yogananda, Paramhansa (2005). Autobiography of a Yogi. Crystal Clarity Publishers. ISBN 978-1-56589-212-5.
- Dasgupta, R. K (June 1986). Sri Sri Ramakrishna Kathamrita as a religious classic. Bulletin of the Ramakrishna Mission Institute of Culture.
- Hixon, Lex (2002). Great Swan: Meetings With Ramakrishna. Burdett, N.Y.: Larson Publications. ISBN 0-943914-80-9.
- Jackson, Carl T. (1994). Vedanta for the West. Indiana University Press. ISBN 0-253-33098-X.
- Gupta, Mahendranath ("M."); Dharm Pal Gupta (2001). Sri Sri Ramakrishna Kathamrita. Sri Ma Trust. ISBN 978-81-88343-00-3.
- D.P. Gupta; D.K. Sengupta, eds. (2004). Sri Sri Ramakrishna Kathamrita Centenary Memorial (PDF). Kolkata: Sri Ma Trust. Archived from the original (PDF) on 16 July 2011.
- Sen, Amiya P. (June 2006). "Sri Ramakrishna, the Kathamrita and the Calcutta middle classes: an old problematic revisited". Postcolonial Studies. 9 (2): 165–177. doi:10.1080/13688790600657835. S2CID 144046925.
- Sen, Amiya P. (2001). "Three essays on Sri Ramakrishna and his times". Indian Institute of Advanced Study.
- Tyagananda; Vrajaprana (2010). Interpreting Ramakrishna: Kali's Child Revisited. Delhi: Motilal Banarsidass. p. 410. ISBN 978-81-208-3499-6.
