= The Gospel of Sri Ramakrishna =

Book by Mahendranath Gupta

- The Gospel of Ramakrishna, 1942 edition.
- Author: Mahendranath Gupta
- Translator: Swami Nikhilananda
- Language: English
- Genre: Spirituality
- Publisher: Ramakrishna-Vivekananda Center
- Publication date: 1942
- Publication place: India
- Pages: 1062
- ISBN: 978-0-911206-01-2
- OCLC: 19930528
- Text: The Gospel of Sri Ramakrishna at Wikisource

The Gospel of Sri Ramakrishna is an English translation of the Bengali religious text Sri Sri Ramakrishna Kathamrita by Swami Nikhilananda. The text records conversations of Ramakrishna with his disciples, devotees and visitors, recorded by Mahendranath Gupta, who wrote the book under the pseudonym of "M." The first edition was published in 1942.

Swami Nikhilananda worked with Margaret Woodrow Wilson, daughter of US president Woodrow Wilson. Margaret helped the swami to refine his literary style into "flowing American English". The mystic hymns were rendered into free verse by the American poet John Moffitt. Wilson and American mythology scholar Joseph Campbell helped edit the manuscript. Aldous Huxley wrote in his foreword, "...'M' produced a book unique, so far as my knowledge goes, in the literature of hagiography. Never have the small events of a contemplative's daily life been described with such a wealth of intimate detail. Never have the casual and unstudied utterances of a great religious teacher been set down with so minute a fidelity."

Nikhilananda wrote that he had written an accurate translation of the Kathamrita, "omitting only a few pages of no particular interest to English-speaking readers" and stating that "often literary grace has been sacrificed for the sake of literal translation." Although Nikhilananda's translation of the Kathamrita is the best known, the first translation published by Swami Abhedananda 35 years earlier.

== Reception ==
=== The Gospel of Sri Ramakrishna ===
Aldous Huxley likened it to James Boswell's Life of Samuel Johnson. The book was voted as one of the "100 Most Important Spiritual Books of the 20th Century" by the American scholars convened by HarperCollins publishers. Scholars Lex Hixon, Swami Tyagananda, Somnath Bhattacharyya argue that the translations considered the cross-cultural factors and western decorum.

Walter G. Neevel in his 1976 essay, The Transformation of Ramakrishna, writes that Nikhilananda's translation are "accurate and reliable efforts...it should be possible to get as close to Sri Ramakrishna's original teachings as is possible without a knowledge of Bengali and to have an adequate degree of certainty about their meaning." Philosopher Lex Hixon writes that the Gospel is "spiritually authentic" and "powerful rendering of the Kathamrita into dignified English." Hixon writes that an eyewitness to the teachings of Ramakrishna reported that Ramakrishna's "linguistic style was unique, even to those who spoke Bengali" and it was "not literally translatable into English or any other language." Hixon writes that Ramakrishna's "colorful village Bengali, replete with obscure local words and idioms" adds to the difficulty of translation. His "obscure local words" were interspersed with technical Sanskrit terms from "various strands of Hindu yoga and philosophy" and "extensive references" to the "complex realm of sacred history" of the Vedas, Puranas, Tantras.

Scholars Narasingha Sil and Jeffery Kripal argue that the book has been bowdlerized. Sil argues that this "standard translation of the Kathamrta by Swami Nikhilananda is bowdlerized, with the 'vulgar expressions' in Ramakrishna's earthy, rustic Bengali either removed or smoothed over: so that 'raman' (sexual intercourse) has become "communion" in the Gospel. Swami Tyagananda explains this as follows: "when a Hindu hears or reads about ramana with God, there is no idea of sex involved." Jeffrey Kripal argues that although Swami Nikhilananda calls the Gospel "a literal translation," he substantially altered Gupta's text, combining the five parallel narratives into a single volume, as well as deleting some passages which he claimed were "of no particular interest to English-speaking readers." Somnath Bhattacharyya, Swami Atmajnanananda and others discussed these concerns. Swami Tyagananda and Vrajaprana wrote that while introducing the Kathamrita to the Western audience of 1942, Nikhilananada considered the Western sensibilities and sought advice of his Western editorial assistants to ensure that there is no cultural faux pas in the manuscript. They also point out that literal translation is not always possible which may result in an inaccurate meaning.
