= Swami Nikhilananda =

Indian Hindu guru (1895–1973)

Personal life
- Born: Dinesh Chandra Das Gupta; 1895 Durgapur Village, Sylhet District, Bengal Presidency, British India ( Now in Bangladesh)
- Died: July 21, 1973 (aged 77–78) Wellesley Island, New York

Religious life
- Religion: Hinduism

Religious career
- Teacher: Sarada Devi

Swami Nikhilananda (1895–1973), born Dinesh Chandra Das Gupta was a direct disciple of Sri Sarada Devi. In 1933, he founded the Ramakrishna-Vivekananda Center of New York, a branch of Ramakrishna Mission, and remained its head until his death in 1973. An accomplished writer and thinker, Nikhilananda's greatest contribution was the translation of Sri Sri Ramakrishna Kathamrita from Bengali into English, published under the title The Gospel of Sri Ramakrishna (1942).

== Biography ==
Swami Nikhilananda was born in 1895 in Durgapur village, Sylhet district, in present-day Bangladesh (British India), and had his education in the University of Calcutta. As a graduate, he chose the profession of journalism. He then joined the Indian freedom movement and was incarcerated for a period in a British prison camp.

As a boy, through his pious parents, he became acquainted with the teachings of Ramakrishna and Swami Vivekananda. These teachings made an indelible impression on his young mind and brought him in touch with the direct disciples of Ramakrishna. He was initiated by Holy Mother. He also met the direct disciples of Ramakrishna, Swamis Brahmananda, Saradananda, Shivananda, Turiyananda, Premananda, Akhandananda, Abhedananda as well as Mahendranath Gupta, the recorder of Kathamrita among others.

After coming into their influence, he abandoned his role as a freedom fighter and renounced the world to join the Ramakrishna Order. As a Brahmachari, for many years he devoted himself to the study of the scriptures under eminent teachers, practised spiritual disciplines, and served the Order in various capacities, until, in 1931, he was deputed by the Order to come to America as one of its representatives. In 1933, he founded the Ramakrishna-Vivekananda Center in New York. Nikhilananda was considered a brilliant speaker and was invited to lecture at different universities, churches, and synagogues, and to participate in inter-religious conferences East and West. He served at the Ramakrishna-Vivekananda Center till his death in 1973. Nikhilananda made important contributions to the literature of Ramakrishna movement. He also attracted distinguished disciples, including author JD Salinger, Margaret Woodrow Wilson, daughter of the president Woodrow Wilson, the comparative mythologist Professor Joseph Campbell, and Chester Carlson, inventor of xerographic process. Philosopher Lex Hixon was Nikhilananda's disciple.

== Literary works ==
His most important works include translations of The Upanishads, The Bhagavad Gita, biographies of Holy Mother and Swami Vivekananda, his compilation of the works of Swami Vivekananda under the title of Vivekananda: The Yogas and Other Works, his two books, Hinduism, Its Meaning for the Liberation of the Spirit, and Man in Search of Immortality, and his many articles written for various journals. His most notable literary work is his translation from original Bengali into English of Kathamrita, published under the title of The Gospel of Sri Ramakrishna. Many of the works of Swami Nikhilananda have already been translated into various European and Indian languages and are recognised as authoritative texts on the interpretations of the teachings of Vedanta.

In 1944, Time Magazine called Swami Nikhilananda's translations of The Bhagavad Gita, "The first really readable, authoritative English translation of one of the world's greatest religious classics." and referred to The Gospel of Sri Ramakrishna as "translation of one of the world's most extraordinary religious documents." The Gospel was voted as one of the "100 Most Important Spiritual Books of the 20th Century" by the American scholars convened by Philip Zaleski and HarperCollins publishers,

== Bibliography ==
- Bhagavad Gita – Swami Nikhilananda ISBN 0-911206-09-4
- Hinduism : Its Meaning for the Liberation of the Spirit – Swami Nikhilananda ISBN 0-911206-26-4
- Holy Mother : life of Holy mother Sri Sarada Devi – Swami Nikhilananda ISBN 0-911206-20-5
- Vivekananda: A Biography – Swami Nikhilananda ISBN 0-911206-25-6
- The Principal Upanishads – Swami Nikhilananda ISBN 0-486-42717-X
- Man in Search of Immortality: Testimonials from the Hindu Scriptures – Swami Nikhilananda ISBN 0-911206-27-2
- Self-Knowledge: Sankara's "Atmabodha" – Swami Nikhilananda ISBN 0-911206-11-6
- The Gospel of Sri Ramakrishna – Swami Nikhilananda

=== Translations ===
- Gupta, Mahendranath. The Gospel of Sri Ramakrishna (1942) (translation from Bengali by Swami Nikhilananda; Ed. Joseph Campbell and Margaret Woodrow Wilson, translation assistants – see preface; foreword by Aldous Huxley)
