= Ramakrishna-Vivekananda Center =

Branch of the Ramakrishna Order

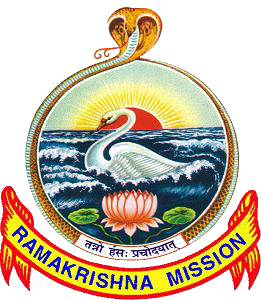
- Emblem

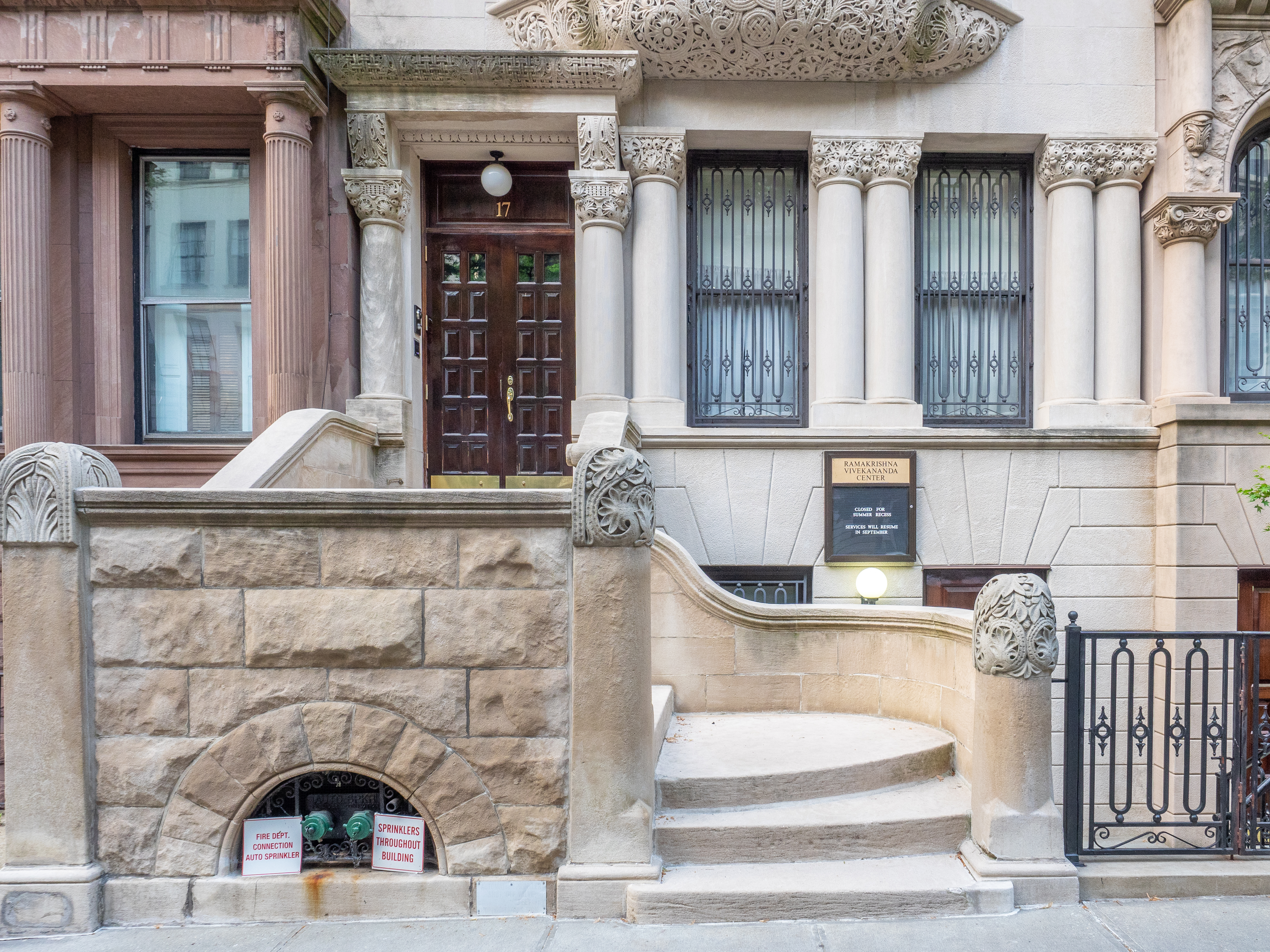
- Temple on the Upper East Side, New York City (2019)
- Formation: 1933
- Location: 17 East 94th Street, New York, NY 10128, USA
- Minister & Spiritual Leader: Swami Yuktatmananda
- Main organ: Ramakrishna Order
- Parent organization: Ramakrishna Mission
- Website: ramakrishna.org

The Ramakrishna Vivekananda Center of New York is a branch of the Ramakrishna Order of India, founded in 1933 by Swami Nikhilananda. After Nikhilananda's death in 1973, the center was headed by Swami Adiswarananda until the latter's death in 2007. Currently, Swami Yuktatmananda heads the center.

The center has a temple in New York City and the summer cottage at Thousand Island Park, New York. It publishes a number of seminal books on Vedanta, written or translated by Swami Nikhilananda, many of which were first published by mainstream publishers, including The Gospel of Sri Ramakrishna, the first complete and best-known translation of Sri Sri Ramakrishna Kathamrita in 1942.

== List of publications ==
- The Gospel of Sri Ramakrishna, the first complete and best-known translation of Sri Sri Ramakrishna Kathamrita
- Holy Mother, a biography of Sri Sarada Devi
- The Upanishads in four volumes, translations of eleven major Upanishads
- The Bhagavad Gita
- Self Knowledge: Atmabodha, a translation of Atmabodha of Sri Shankaracharya
- Hinduism: Its Meaning for the Liberation of the Spirit
- Man in Search of Immortality: Testimonials from the Hindu Scriptures
- Vivekananda: A Biography
- Vivekananda: The Yogas & Other Works
