= Ramakrishna =

Indian mystic (1836–1886)

Ramakrishna Paramahamsa
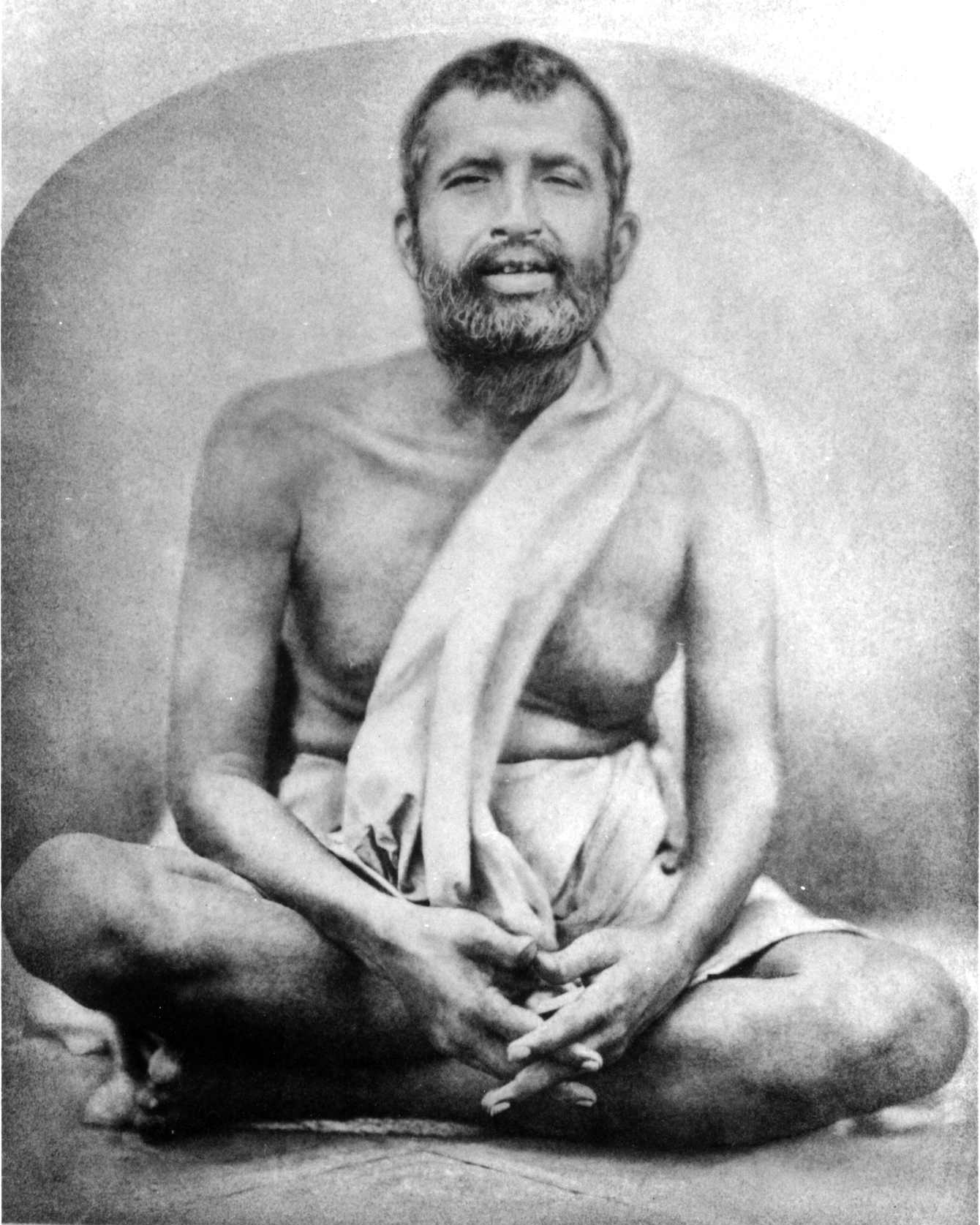
- Ramakrishna at Dakshineswar, 1883–84

Personal life
- Born: Ramakrishna Chattopadhyay; 18 February 1836 Kamarpukur, Bengal Presidency, Company India (now West Bengal, India)
- Died: 16 August 1886 (aged 50) Cossipore, Bengal Presidency, British India (now West Bengal, India)
- Cause of death: Throat cancer
- Spouse: Sarada Devi (m. 1859)
- Parent(s): Khudiram Chattopadhyay (Father); Chandramani Devi (Mother)
- Honors: Paramahamsa

Religious life
- Religion: Hinduism
- Temple: Dakshineswar Kali Temple
- Founder of: Ramakrishna Order
- Philosophy: Advaita Vedanta; Shaktism
- School: Vedanta
- Lineage: Daśanāmi Sampradaya

Religious career
- Teacher: Totapuri, Bhairavi Brahmani, and others
- Disciples: Swami Vivekananda and others

Ramakrishna (18 February 1836 – 16 August 1886), also called Ramakrishna Paramahamsa (pronounced [ramɔkriʂno pɔromoɦɔŋʃo]; IAST: Rāmakṛṣṇa Paramahaṃsa), born Ramakrishna Chattopadhyay (his childhood nickname was Gadadhar), was an Indian Hindu mystic. He was a devotee of the goddess Kali, but adhered to various religious practices from the Hindu traditions of Vaishnavism, Tantric Shaktism, and Advaita Vedanta, as well as Christianity and Sufi Islam. His parable-based teachings advocated the essential unity of religions and proclaimed that world religions are "so many paths to reach one and the same goal". He is regarded by his followers as an avatar (divine incarnation).

Epigraph

"I have practised all religions - Hinduism, Islam, Christianity - and I have also followed the paths of the different Hindu sects. I have found that it is the same God toward whom all are directing their steps, though along different paths. You must try all beliefs and traverse all the different ways once. Wherever I look, I see men quarrelling in the name of religion - Hindus, Mohammedans, Brahmos, Vaishnavas, and the rest. But they never reflect that He who is called Krishna is also called Siva, and bears the name of the Primal Energy, Jesus, and Allah as well - the same Rama with a thousand names. A lake has several Ghats. At one, the Hindus take water in pitchers and call it ' Jal '; at another the Mussalmans take water in leather bags and call it ' pani '. At a third the Christians call it ' water '. Can we imagine that it is not ' Jal ', but only ' pani ' or ' water '? How ridiculous! The substance is One under different names, and everyone is seeking the same substance; only climate, temperament, and name create differences. Let each man follow his own path. If he sincerely and ardently wishes to know God, peace be unto him! He will surely realize Him."

— Ramakrishna

Ramakrishna was born in Kamarpukur, Bengal Presidency, India. He described going through religious experiences in childhood. Around the age of twenty, he became a temple priest at the Dakshineshwar Kali Temple in Calcutta. While at the temple, his devotional temperament and intense religious practices led him to experience various spiritual visions. He was assured of the authenticity and sanctity of his visions by several religious teachers.

Ramakrishna's native language was Bengali, but he also spoke Hindi (Hindustani) and understood Sanskrit. There are instances recorded in the Gospel of Ramakrishna of him using English words a few times.

In 1859, in accordance with then prevailing customs, Ramakrishna was married to Sarada Devi, a marriage that was never consummated. As described in the Gospel of Ramakrishna, he took spiritual instruction from several gurus in various paths and religions, and was also initiated into sannyasa in 1865 by Tota Puri, a vedanta monk. Ramakrishna gained widespread acclaim amongst the temple visiting public as a guru, attracting social leaders, elites, and common people alike. Although initially reluctant to consider himself a guru, he eventually taught disciples and founded the monastic Ramakrishna Order. His emphasis on direct spiritual experience instead of adhering to scriptural injunctions has been influential. Ramakrishna died due to throat cancer on the night of 15 August 1886. After his death, his chief disciple Swami Vivekananda continued and expanded his spiritual mission, both in India and the West.

== Early life ==
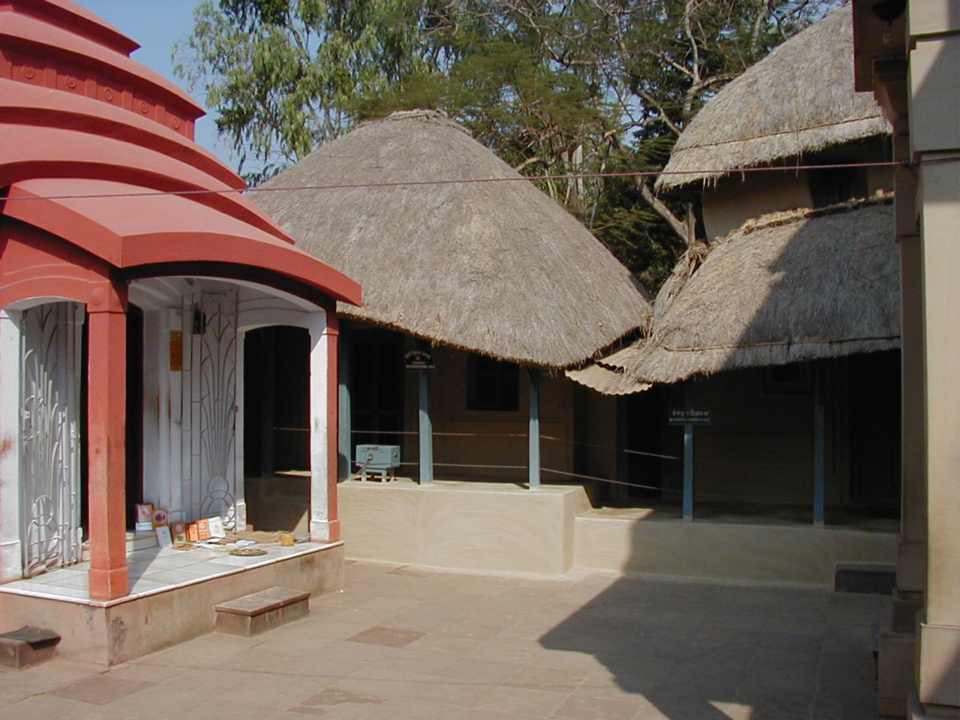
The small house (centre) at Kamarpukur, where Ramakrishna lived. His family shrine (left), with birthplace temple on the right.

=== Birth and childhood ===
Ramakrishna was born on 18 February 1836, in the village of Kamarpukur, in the Hooghly district of West Bengal, India, in a poor and pious Bengali Brahmin family. He was the fourth and the youngest child of his parents, father Khudiram Chattopadhyaya, born in 1775, and mother Chandramani Devi, born in 1791. The couple's first son Ramkumar is said to have been born in 1805, a daughter Katyayani five years later, and a second son Rameswar in 1826.

Chandramani Devi was Khudiram's second wife. His first wife died young. Khudiram had ancestral property in the Dere Village of present-day West Bengal, India. An unscrupulous landlord, Ramananda Roy, who was angry with Khudiram for refusing to commit perjury, brought a false petition against him in the court and took possession of his ancestral property. Bereft of all property, Khudiram and Chandramani Devi moved to Kamarpukur where a friend, Sukhlal Goswami, gifted them one Bigha and ten Chataks of land for their maintenance.

According to traditional accounts, parents of Ramakrishna reported having experienced supernatural incidents and visions regarding his birth. In Gaya, his father Khudiram had a dream in which Bhagavan Gadadhara (a form of Vishnu) told him that he would be born as his son. Chandramani Devi reported to have had a vision of light entering her womb from the lingam in Yogider Shiv mandir. In another vision following Ramakrishna's birth, his mother saw a strange tall person lying in the bed instead of the baby Ramakrishna.

The family was devoted to the Hindu deity Rama, the family deity was Sri Raghubir–an epithet of Rama, and the male children of Khudiram and Chandramani were given names that started with Ram or Rama: Ramkumar, Rameswar, and Ramakrishna. There has been some dispute about the origin of the name Ramakrishna, but there is "...evidence which proves beyond doubt that the name 'Ramakrishna' was given to him by his father..." Ramakrishna confirmed this himself, as recorded in "M"s diaries, "I was a pet child of my father. He used to call me Ramakrishnababu." (Note: Please read the Talk Page before editing about Ramakrishna's birth name)

=== First "superconsciousness experience" ===
At age nine, in accordance with Brahminical tradition, the sacred thread was vested on Ramakrishna, thus making him eligible for conducting ritual worship. He would later help his family in performing worship of their deities. According to Saradananda, as a result of his devotion in worship, he started to experience Bhava-Samadhi or Savikalpa-Samadhi. He reportedly had experiences of similar nature a few other times in his childhood—while worshiping the Goddess Vishalakshi, and portraying the God Shiva in a drama during the Shivaratri festival.

Ramakrishna described his first "superconsciousness experience,"

"When I was ten or eleven years old and lived in Kamapukur, I first experienced samadhi. As I was passing through a paddy-field, I saw something and was overwhelmed. There are certain characteristics of God-vision. One sees light, feels joy, and experiences the upsurge of a great current in one's chest, like the bursting of a rocket."

Further details are given, "One morning, while walking along the narrow ridges of a paddy field, eating puffed rice from a small basket, he saw a flock of white cranes flying against the backdrop of a dark rain cloud. The sight captivated him that he lost external awareness, and collapsed with the rice scattered around him. People nearby who saw this came to his rescue and carried him home."

This experience has been interpreted as Samadhi by Ramakrishna and his followers, but also as a trance or epileptic seizure by naturalistic minded interpreters. Samādhi, in Hinduism, Buddhism, Jainism, Sikhism, is a state of meditative consciousness. In many Indian religious traditions, the cultivation of Samādhi through various meditation methods is essential for the attainment of spiritual liberation.

=== Education ===
Ramakrishna was sent to the village school where he learned to read and write, but had an aversion towards arithmetic and didn't progress beyond simple addition, multiplication and division. He read the Ramayana, the Mahabharata and other religious books with devotion. He observed the scholars and found that they were only interested in acquiring wealth and contrasted this with his father's standards of detachment and righteous conduct. He later lost interest in this "bread-winning education". He instead became proficient in making images, acting and painting. When he was fourteen years old, he started a drama group with some of his friends and left school to pursue it. Ramakrishna had practically no formal education and spoke ungrammatical imperfect Bengali with a rustic accent.

Kamarpukur, being a transit-point on the well-established pilgrimage routes to Puri, brought Ramakrishna into contact with many renunciate saints and holy men. He became well-versed in the Puranas, the Ramayana, the Mahabharata, and the Bhagavata Purana, hearing them from the wandering monks and the Kathaks–a class of men in ancient India who preached and sang the Purāṇas. He used to sing and enact the songs and scenes from the Purāṇas to the village women. A trader, Durgadas Pyne, who enforced a strict purdah on the women in his household, criticised those who would meet Ramakrishna to listen to the Purāṇas. Ramakrishna argued with him that women will be protected through good education and devotion to God, and not through Purdah. Once a challenge was thrown by Durgadas that it was impossible to look into his inner apartments, Ramakrishna accepted the challenge and dressed himself like a weaver woman, then fooled Durgadas with his disguise and entered the inner apartments of his house. Durgadas, defeated, allowed the women to go and listen to Ramakrishna's recitals.

Ramakrishna's father died in 1843, a loss which he felt very strongly and made him reticent. He would visit the nearby cremation ground alone to practice spiritual disciplines there. At this stage the family responsibilities fell on his elder brother, Ramkumar, who was about thirty-one years older than him. When Ramakrishna was in his teens, the family's financial position worsened, Ramkumar then started a Sanskrit school in Calcutta (Jhama pukur lane), whilst also serving as a priest there. In 1852, Ramakrishna moved to Calcutta along with his brother to assist him with the priestly work.

== Priesthood and marriage ==
=== Lead up to priesthood ===
In the 19th century Calcutta, there lived Rani Rasmani, a wealthy woman with a commanding personality. A widow with four daughters, she was the first of the many prominent women who played a major role in the life of Ramakrishna. Inheriting property from her husband the late Babu Rajchandra Das, the Rani managed to endear herself to the people of the city through her exceptional managerial skills of the estate, her resistance against the British colonial authorities, and her various philanthropic works. Known well for her kindness, benevolence to the poor, and also for her religious devotion, she was much loved and revered by the people and proved herself to be worthy of the title "Rani". Being an ardent devotee of the Goddess Kali, the Rani had the words, "Sri Rasmani Dasi, longing for the Feet of Kali”, inscribed in her estates official seal. After having a vision of the Goddess Kali in a dream on the night before her departure for a pilgrimage to the Hindu holy city of Kashi, she founded the now famous Dakshineswar Kali Temple. Reportedly in the dream, the goddess instructed her that instead of visiting Kashi she better set up a stone idol of the Goddess at a beautiful place on the banks of the Bhagirathi River, and make arrangements for the daily worship and prasada offering there, then she would manifest in the deity and receive her worship.

With great delight the Rani bought a large piece of land on the banks of Hooghly river at Dakshineswar and started the construction of a nine-spired temple where pilgrims could congregate to catch a glimpse of the Goddess. However, for being born into a Cāsi kaivarta family, she was deemed unworthy by the local Brahmins to make food offerings to Kali. It was her heart's desire to offer prasada to Kali, and if she did so going against the norms of the Brahmanical society of the time, the devotees would no longer visit that temple, nor would a Brahmin priest officiate there. To find a scriptural solution to her problem, the Rani sought written opinions of various pandits from different parts of the country. However, none of the opinions were in her favor. When all hope was seemingly lost, she received a letter from Ramkumar, who assured her that the scriptural principles would be observed intact if she made a gift of the property to a Brahmin, who could then install the deity and make arrangements for food offerings. No blemish would then be incurred by those who partook the prasada there. She readily agreed to these conditions, displaying savviness in working around the rigidities of caste while adhering to its restrictions.

The Rani thus decided to consecrate the temple and proceeded with her plans. While the search for a priest was on, a Brahmin named Mahesh Chandra Chattopadhyaya who worked on the estate of the Rani, and her secretary Ramdhan Ghosh, both of whom were well acquainted with Ramkumar, requested him to officiate as a priest at the temple of the Rani, albeit temporarily. The devout Ramkumar agreed and later after the opening of the temple on the last day of May in 1855, on request by the Rani, he continued as its chief priest.

Ramkumar informed Ramakrishna that he was taking up the post of the priest and asked him to stay at the Kali Temple. At this injunction Ramakrishna strenuously objected and reminded Ramkumar that their father never officiated in the ceremonies of the purported 'lower castes' and refused to join him, but the will of Ramkumar prevailed in this matter. To conquer his own ego on caste, he performed menial tasks like cleaning the toilets of untouchables (scavengers) using his own hair and hands, teaching that such acts remove feelings of shame, hatred, and fear associated with caste.

=== Officiation as priest ===
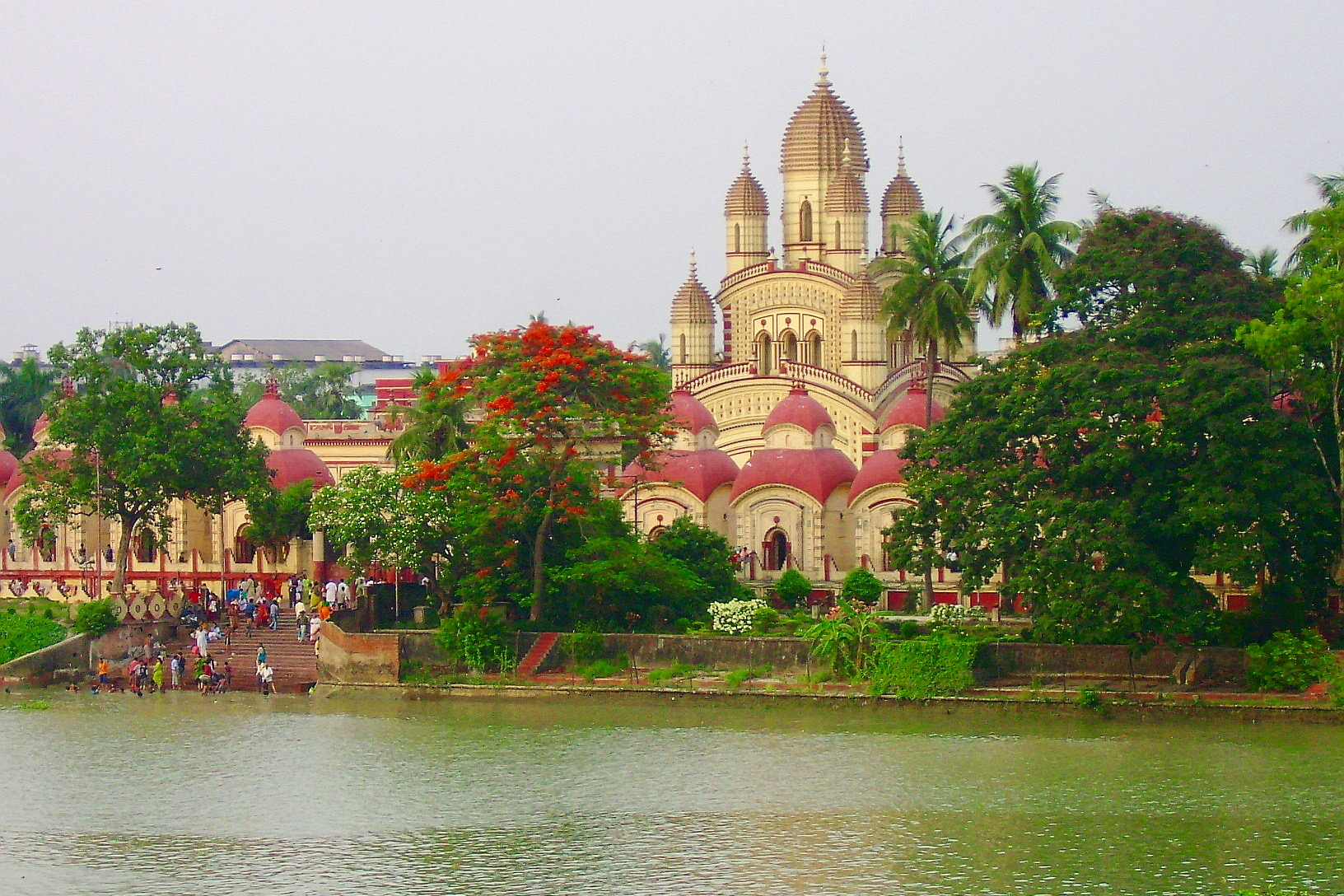
Dakshineswar Kali Temple, built under the aegis of Rani Rasmani in 1855. Sri Ramakrishna lived a major part of his life here.

On Thursday, 31 May 1855, Ramkumar in the presence of his brother Ramakrishna officiated at the dedication ceremony of the Dakshineswar Kali Temple.

Within three months after the consecration of the temple, Mathur Babu, the Rani's right-hand man and son-in-law, was much impressed by Ramakrishna and appointed him with the task of dressing up the deity of Kali, and Hriday, the sixteen year old nephew of Ramakrishna was appointed as an assistant to both him and Ramkumar. Soon, Ramkumar began to teach his brother the modes of worship and service of the Goddess, in the hope that he might perform them in his absence. To initiate him properly, a Sadhaka of Shakti named Kenaram Bhattacharya was invited. He was apparently charmed to see the religious fervor in Ramakrishna, who reportedly became ecstatic as soon as a mantra was recited in his ear. In order to get him more accustomed, Ramkumar later employed Ramakrishna on few occasions to perform the worship of Kali.

As Ramkumar grew too old and infirm to carry out the difficult duties at the Kali temple, Mathur with the permission of the Rani, requested him to move to the Vishnu temple in the complex for conducting worship, and appointed Ramakrishna to the office of priest. Ramkumar was glad with this arrangement, and after serving for one year since the consecration of the temple, he died suddenly in 1856 while preparing to go home on a leave.

=== Vision of the Goddess Kali ===
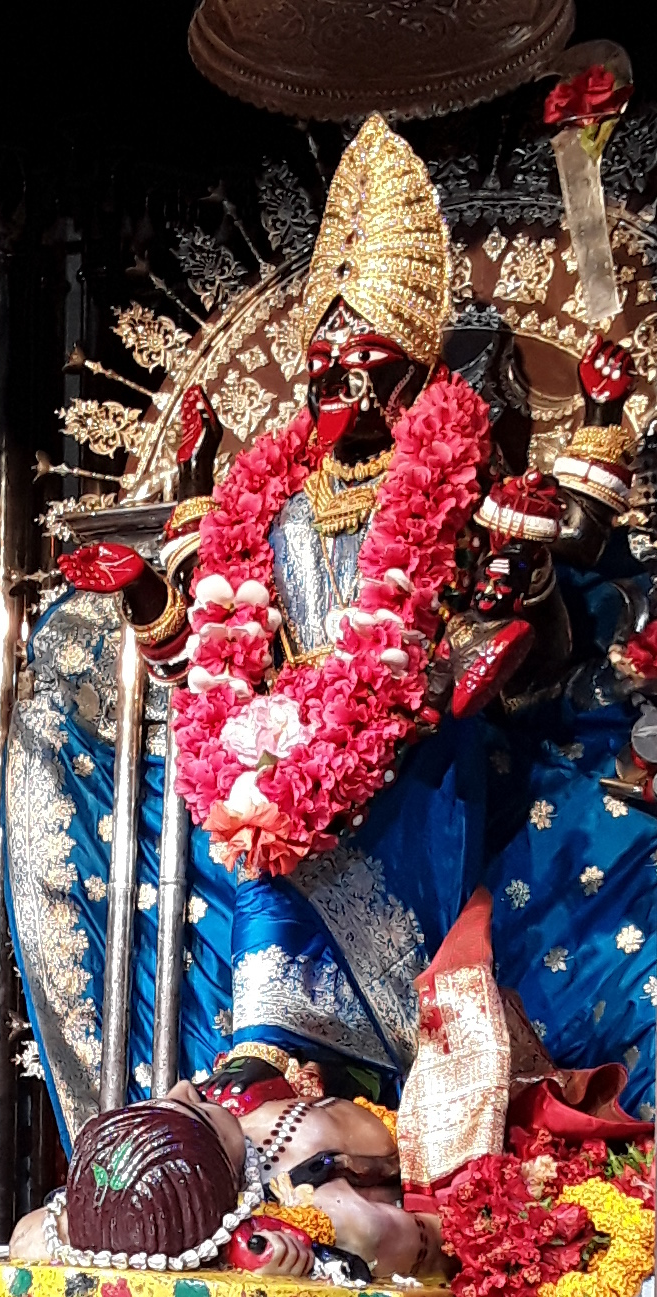
The idol of goddess Kali as Bhavatāriṇi in the sanctum sanctorum of the Dakshineswar Kali Temple.

At age 20, Ramakrishna, who by now had witnessed more than one death in his family, realising the utter impermanence of life, became more engrossed in the worship of Kali. After the daily worship, he would sit in the temple looking intently at the deity and get absorbed in her, before losing himself in devotion whilst singing with profound emotion the songs composed by devotees like Ramprasad and Kamalakanta. He regarded their songs as an aid in his worship, and was certain about having the vision of Kali as Ramprasad did. With an ardent heart, he would say, "Thou showed thyself to Ramprasad, Mother, why then shouldst Thou not reveal Thyself to me? I don't want wealth, friends, relatives, enjoyment of pleasure, and the like. Do show Thyself to me." Being averse to wasting any time, after the closure of the temple during midday or at night, he would visit the nearby jungle to think about and meditate on Kali.

Before meditating, he would put his clothes and the sacred thread aside, and meditate completely naked. When Hriday found this out, he confronted his uncle and asked him to explain his strange conduct. Ramakrishna answered that when one thinks about God, one should be free from all attachments and the eight servitudes of "hatred, fear, shame, aversion, egoism, vanity, noble descent, and good conduct." He viewed his sacred thread as a display of the ego of his Brahmin descent and thus kept it aside, saying that when calling upon the Mother, one should discard all such bondages and call on Her with a focused mind. He assured his nephew that he would put them on after the end of his meditation. Hriday was aghast at hearing this and left him in dismay.

In this way, Ramakrishna spent his days and nights altogether in prayer, singing, and meditation while his longing for her vision kept increasing daily. It was not long before people around the temple started noticing his passion and adherence to devotion, which was quite unperturbed by the opinions of people around him. The Rani was informed by her son-in-law Mathurmohan Biswas thus: "We have got an extraordinary worshipper; the Goddess will be awakened very soon".

As the days passed, Ramakrishna's food intake and sleep gradually declined and when not engaged in either worship or meditation, he was seen in a state of turmoil over whether he would get a vision of the Mother. Seeing the evening sun, he would cry, "Mother, another day is gone and still I have not seen you!" Eventually he would question, "Are you true, Mother, or is it all a fabrication of my mind, mere poetry without reality? If you do exist, why can't I see you?"

Soon his longing for her vision became extreme and he was engaged in either worship or meditation for almost twenty-four hours a day. Despairing, and feeling an unbearable pain at the thought that he might never have her vision, one day, as he later recounted: "In my agony, I said to myself, 'What is the use of this life?' Suddenly my eyes fell on the sword that hangs in the temple. I decided to end my life with it then and there. Like a madman, I ran to it and seized it. And then — I had a marvellous vision of the Mother and fell down unconscious." He became overwhelmed and before fainting, observed that to his spiritual sight, houses, doors, temples and everything else around vanishing into an empty void and "What I saw, was a boundless infinite conscious sea of light! However far and in whatever direction I looked, I found a continuous succession of effulgent waves coming forward, raging and storming from all sides with great speed. Very soon they fell on me and made me sink to the unknown bottom. I panted, struggled and fell unconscious. I did not know what happened then in the external world — how that day and the next slipped away. But, in my heart of hearts, there was flowing a current of intense bliss, never experienced before, and I had the immediate knowledge of the light that was Mother." When he regained consciousness, he was found uttering the word "Maa" (Mother) repeatedly in an aching voice.

Thoroughly convinced of Kali's existence, Ramakrishna now lived at her abode, all the time, and like a child disinclined to leave its mother, so was he disinclined to leave his Divine Mother Kali. Hovering in an ocean of bliss he guided various seekers to Kali, realising one cannot experience it anywhere but from Her. When asked why he called the deity a "Mother", he answered that it was because the child is most free with the Mother, and she alone can cherish the child more than anyone else. People around him noted that he engaged in talks of spiritual matters only and never about any worldly issues, and while talking about Kali the Divine Mother, he would simply cry and be elated. When someone once asked him about Kali worship, he said:

"I do not worship Kali made of clay and straw. My Mother is the conscious principle. My Mother is pure Satchidananda — Existence-Knowledge-Bliss Absolute. That which is infinite and deep is always dark-coloured. The extensive sky is dark-coloured and so is the deep sea. My Kali is infinite, all-pervading, and consciousness itself."

=== Marriage ===
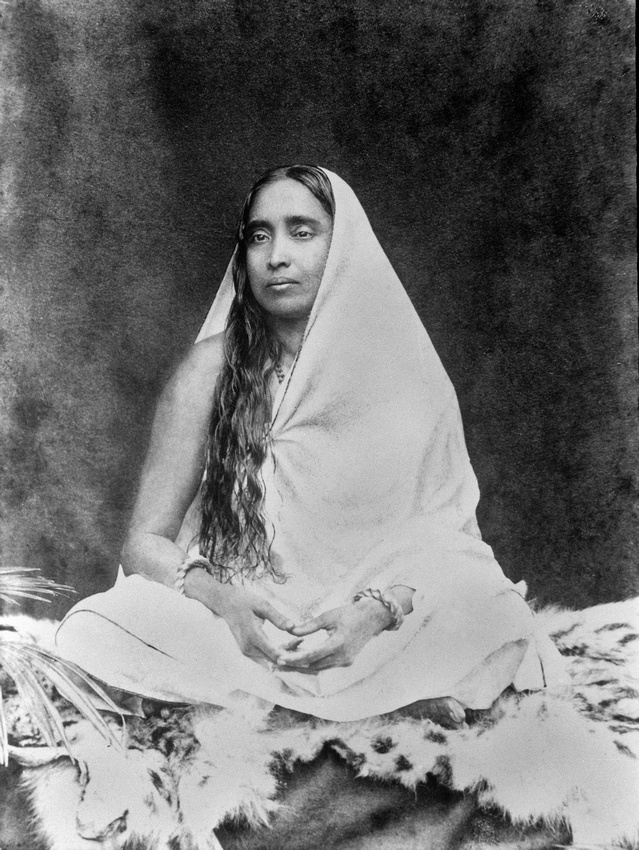
Sarada Devi (1853–1920), wife and spiritual counterpart of Ramakrishna.

Rumors spread to Kamarpukur that Ramakrishna became unstable as a result of his spiritual practices at Dakshineswar. Ramakrishna's mother and his elder brother Rameswar decided to get Ramakrishna married, thinking that marriage would be a good steadying influence upon him by forcing him to take up responsibilities, and keep his attention on normal affairs rather than on his spiritual practices and visions. Ramakrishna himself mentioned that they would find the bride at the house of Ramchandra Mukherjee in Jayrambati, three miles to the north-west of Kamarpukur. The five-year-old bride, Saradamani Mukhopadhyaya (later known as Sarada Devi; she is also considered an avatar) was found, and the marriage was duly solemnised in 1859. Ramakrishna was twenty-three at this point, but this age difference for marriage was typical for nineteenth-century rural Bengal. They later spent three months together in Kamarpukur when Sarada Devi was fourteen, and Ramakrishna thirty-two. Ramakrishna became a very influential figure in Sarada's life, and she became a strong follower of his teachings. After the marriage, Sarada stayed at Jayrambati and joined Ramakrishna in Dakshineswar at the age of eighteen.

By the time his bride joined him, Ramakrishna had already embraced the monastic life of a sannyasi, and the marriage was never consummated.

Once as a part of practicing the spiritual mood called mādhurā bhavā sādhana, Ramakrishna dressed and behaved as a woman. Disciple Mahendranath Gupta quoted the Master as follows:

How can a man conquer passion? He should assume the attitude of a woman. I spent many days as the handmaid of God. I dressed myself in women's clothes, put on ornaments and covered the upper part of my body with a scarf, just like a woman. With the scarf on, I used to perform the evening worship before the image. Otherwise, how could I have kept my wife with me for eight months? Both of us behaved as if we were the handmaid of the Divine Mother.

As a priest, Ramakrishna performed the ritual ceremony of the Shodashi Puja in his room, where he worshipped his wife Sarada Devi as the Divine Mother herself. Ramakrishna regarded Sarada Devi as the Divine Mother in person, addressing her as the Holy Mother, and it was by this name that she became known to Ramakrishna's disciples. Sarada Devi outlived Ramakrishna by thirty-four years and played an important role in the development of the nascent religious movement.

== God-realisation via various traditions ==
In 1860, Ramakrishna returned to Dakshineswar and was again caught up in a spiritual tempest forgetting his wife, home, body, and surroundings. He once described his experiences during this most tumultuous period of his life thus:

"No sooner had I passed through one spiritual crisis than another took its place. It was like being in the midst of a whirlwind, even my sacred thread was blown away. I could seldom keep hold of my dhoti [cloth]. Sometimes I would open my mouth, and it would be as if my jaws reached from heaven to the underworld. "Mother!" I would cry desperately. I felt I had to pull her in, as a fisherman pulls in fish with his dragnet. A prostitute walking the street would appear to me to be Sita, going to meet her victorious husband. An English boy standing cross-legged against a tree reminded me of the boy Krishna, and I lost consciousness. Sometimes I would share my food with a dog. My hair became matted. Birds would perch on my head and peck at the grains of rice which had lodged there during the worship. Snakes would crawl over my motionless body. An ordinary man couldn't have borne a quarter of that tremendous fervour; it would have burnt him up. I had no sleep at all for six long years. My eyes lost the power of winking. I stood in front of a mirror and tried to close my eyelids with my finger and I couldn't! I got frightened and said to Mother: "Mother, is this what happens to those who call on you? I surrendered myself to you, and you gave me this terrible disease!" I used to shed tears — but then, suddenly, I'd be filled with ecstasy. I saw that my body didn't matter — it was of no importance, a mere trifle. Mother appeared to me and comforted me and freed me from my fear."

Ramakrishna grew up practicing Bhakti towards Lord Rama, and his duties as a priest at the Dakshineswar temple led him to practice worship of the Mother Kali. While serving as a temple priest at Dakshineswar, Ramakrishna would encounter various itinerant sadhus who would visit his place and stay there for a while. Practicing their own modes of worship, several of them initiated Ramakrishna into various schools of Hinduism.

In the year 1861, a female ascetic named Bhairavi Brahmani, initiated Ramakrishna into Tantra. Afterwards, he took up the practise of vatsalya bhava (attitude of a Parent towards the divine child) under a Vaishnava guru named Jatadhari. In 1865, a Vedanta monk named Tota Puri, initiated Ramakrishna into sannyasa and he attained Nirvikalpa Samadhi, considered as culmination of spiritual practices. In 1866, Govinda Roy, a Hindu guru who practised Sufism, initiated Ramakrishna into Islam, further in 1873, Ramakrishna practiced Christianity and had the Bible read to him.

After more than a decade of sadhana in various religious paths, each culminating in the realisation of God by that path, his personal practices settled, and he is said to have remained in bhavamukha, a level of blissful samadhi. He would meditate in the Panchavati (a wooded and secluded area of the Dakshineswar Temple grounds), go to the Kali temple to offer flowers to the Mother, and wave incense to the assorted deities and religious figures, whose pictures hung in his room.

=== Rama Bhakti ===
At some point in the period between his vision of Kali and his marriage, Ramakrishna practised dāsya bhāva, (Note: The Vaishnava Bhakti traditions speak of five different moods, referred to as bhāvas, different attitudes that a devotee can take up to express his love for God. They are: śānta, the "peaceful attitude"; dāsya, the attitude of a servant; sakhya, the attitude of a friend; vātsalya, the attitude of a mother toward her child; and madhura, the attitude of a woman towards her lover.) during which he worshipped Rama with the attitude of Hanuman, who is considered to be the ideal devotee and servant of Rama. According to Ramakrishna, towards the end of this sadhana, he had a vision of Sita, the consort of Rama, merging into his body.

Bhairavi Brahmani, an ascetic who used to carry with her the Raghuvir Shila – a stone idol representing lord Rama and all Vaishnava deities, who is also well versed in the texts of Gaudiya Vaishnavism stated that Ramakrishna was experiencing a phenomenon that accompanies mahabhava, the supreme attitude of loving devotion towards the divine, and quoting from the bhakti shastras, she stated that other religious figures like Radha and Chaitanya had similar experiences.

=== Tantra ===
Tantra focuses on the worship of shakti and the object of tantric training is to transcend the barriers between the holy and unholy as a means of achieving liberation and to see all aspects of the natural world as manifestations of the divine shakti.

In the year 1861, an itinerant middle-aged female ascetic named Bhairavi Brahmani initiated Ramakrishna into Tantra. Under her guidance, Ramakrishna went through sixty-four major tantric sadhanas which were completed in 1863. For all the sixty-four sadhana, he took only three days each to complete. He began with mantra rituals such as japa and purascarana and many other rituals designed to purify the mind and establish self-control. He later proceeded towards tantric sadhanas, which generally include a set of heterodox practices called vamachara (left-hand path), which utilise as a means of liberation, activities like eating of parched grain, fish and meat along with drinking of wine and sexual intercourse. According to Ramakrishna and his biographers, Ramakrishna did not directly participate in the last two of those activities (some even say he didn't indulge in meat eating), all that he needed was a suggestion of them to produce the desired result. Ramakrishna acknowledged the left-hand tantric path, though it had "undesirable features", as one of the "valid roads to God-realisation", he consistently cautioned his devotees and disciples against associating with it.

The Bhairavi also taught Ramakrishna the kumari-puja, a form of ritual in which the Virgin Goddess is worshipped symbolically in the form of a young girl. Under the tutelage of the Bhairavi, Ramakrishna also learnt Kundalini Yoga. The Bhairavi, with the yogic techniques and the tantra, played an important part in the initial spiritual development of Ramakrishna.

=== Vaishnava Bhakti ===
In 1864, Ramakrishna practised vātsalya bhāva under a Vaishnava guru Jatadhari. During this period, he worshipped a small metal image of Ramlālā (Rama as a child) in the attitude of a mother. According to Ramakrishna, he could feel the presence of child Rama as a living God in the metal image.

Ramakrishna later engaged in the practice of madhura bhāva, the attitude of the Gopis and Radha towards Krishna. During the practise of this bhava, Ramakrishna dressed himself in women's attire for several days and regarded himself as one of the gopis of Vrindavan. According to Ramakrishna, madhura bhava is one of the ways to root out the idea of sex, which is seen as an impediment in spiritual life. According to Ramakrishna, towards the end of this sadhana, he attained savikalpa samadhi (god seen with form and qualities)—vision and union with Krishna.

Ramakrishna visited Nadia, the home of Chaitanya Mahaprabhu and Nityananda Prabhu, the fifteenth-century founders of Bengali Gaudiya Vaishnava bhakti. According to Ramakrishna, he had an intense vision of two young boys merging into his body while he was crossing the river in a boat. Earlier, after his vision of Kali, he is said to have cultivated the Santa bhava—the child attitude – towards Kali.

=== Tota Puri and Vedanta ===
Towards the end of 1864, an itinerant monk named Tota Puri, a tall naked mendicant with tangled hair; a Naga sadhu of Mahanirvani Akhara, born probably in Punjab, arrived at Dakshineswar while on a pilgrimage through various holy sites in India. He was the head of a monastery and claimed leadership over seven hundred sannyasis. These sannyasis are renowned to be the knowers of Brahman, and as beings who are thoroughly satisfied in themselves. They see the whole universe as Brahman and its manifestation through Maya. They are always on move, traveling to different pilgrimage places, visiting various temples and meeting holy people in order to experience Brahman there. Tota Puri was one such man who was on a similar visit when he arrived at Dakshineswar. It was a traditional convention with him to not spend more than three days at any one place, and arrived at the Kali temple expecting to spend only three days there.

==== Initial meeting ====
Arriving at the temple ghat, Tota Puri had a glimpse of the devotional face of Ramakrishna, and stepped up to him wondering if he can be a fit aspirant for learning Vedanta in Bengal, a province which was then saturated with Tantra. After observing Ramakrishna rigorously, he asked him on his own volition if he was interested in practicing any Vedantic disciplines. Ramakrishna replied, "I know nothing of what I should do or not; my Mother knows everything; I shall do as She commands." A startled Tota told him to go ask your mother then, at which Ramakrishna silently went into the temple and returned ecstatically with a joyful face and informed that his Mother said, "Go and learn; it is in order to teach you that the monk came here." Being aware that whom Ramakrishna was referring to as his Mother was the idol in the temple, Tota though fascinated at this childlike simplicity, opined his behaviour was due to ignorance and false beliefs. Being a learned man and of sharp intellect, Tota had no regard for any deity except for the Ishvara of Vedanta. He looked upon the Devi as a delusional figure and had no belief in her existence, much less worshipping or propitiating Her. However, he did not say anything about this to Ramakrishna as he felt his impressions of mind would anyway pass away once initiated into sannyasa.

==== Initiation into sannyasa ====
At the Panchavati, situated to the north of the temple garden, Ramakrishna was initiated into sannyasa by Tota Puri. At the dawn of morning in the auspicious moment of Brahmamuhurtha, with the Homa fire lighted, he was guided through the various rites and ceremonies involved in the procedure of becoming a Sannyasi. In accordance with the scriptural injunctions and tradition of successive generations, he offered as an oblation; to be free from the desire of having spouse, children, wealth, admiration from people, beautiful body and so on, and renounced them all. He then also offered his sacred thread and the tuft of hair on his head as part of the oblation. A pair of Kaupinas (cloth-covering worn over the privities) and an ochre cloth were then presented by the guru Tota to the sadhaka Ramakrishna, who was then instructed by Tota thus:

"Brahman, the one substance which alone is eternally pure, eternally awakened, unlimited by time, space and causation, is absolutely real. Through Maya, which makes the impossible possible, It causes, by virtue of its influence, to seem that It is divided into names and forms. Brahman is never really so divided. For, at the time of Samadhi, not even a drop, so to say, of time and space, and name and form produced by Maya is perceived. Whatever, therefore, is within the bounds of name and form can never be absolutely real. Shun it by a good distance. Break the firm cage of name and form with the overpowering strength of a lion and come out of it. Dive deep into the reality of the Self existing in yourself. Be one with It with the help of Samadhi. You will then see the universe consisting of name and form, vanish, as it were, into the void; you will see the consciousness of the little I merge in that of the immense I, where it ceases to function; and you will have the immediate knowledge of the indivisible Existence-Knowledge-Bliss as yourself."

==== Experience of samadhi ====
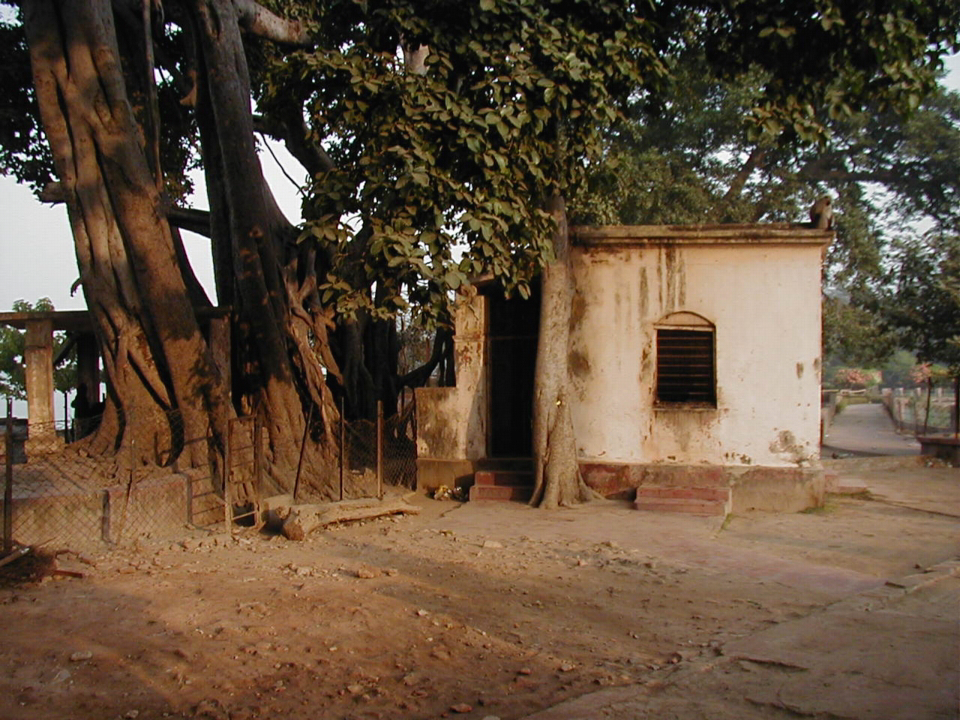
The Panchavati and the hut, where Ramakrishna performed his advaitic sadhana. The mud hut has been replaced by a brick one.

Quoting scriptures, Tota explained to his disciple the need to attain the non-dual consciousness as it alone can provide a person the supreme bliss. He tried to enable his disciple to experience the gains from his lifelong sadhana right on that day, and attempted to make him attain Samadhi. He asked his disciple to free his mind from all functions, and merge it in the meditation of the Self. It so came to pass that when Ramakrishna sat for meditation, he could by no means make his mind stop from functioning. He would withdraw his mind easily from everything, but as soon as he did so, the intimately familiar form of the divine Mother, made up of pure consciousness, would appear before him as a living and moving being, making him unmindful of renunciation. Every time he sat for meditation, this happened all over again, and becoming nearly hopeless, he said to his guru, "No, it cannot be done; I cannot make the mind free from functioning and force it to dive into the Self." Criticising his disciple very harshly for his defiance, Tota, now feverishly went about searching in the hut. After finding a broken piece of glass, he took it into his hand and forcibly pierced its needlelike pointed end on his disciple's forehead between the eyebrows and said, "Collect the mind here to this point With a firm determination." Ramakrishna, now determined, sat for meditation, and when as previously the form of the divine Mother appeared before his mind, he immediately cut her mentally into two with the sword of knowledge. According to Ramakrishna, there remained then "no function in the mind, which transcended quickly the realm of names and forms, making me merge in Samadhi."

After being around for a long time near his disciple who's now merged into Samadhi, Tota came out of the hut and locked its door lest someone may enter. Taking his seat outside under the Panchavati, he awaited a call to open the door. Days passed by and nights rolled on and at the end of three days when there was no call, surprised and curious, he entered the hut and found Ramakrishna sitting in the exact same posture in which he left him, with no sign of breath whatsoever and face calm and radiant. Highly versed in the phenomena of Samadhi, Tota was astonished and thought, "Is it indeed true, what I see enacted before me? Has this great soul actually realised in a day what I could experience only as the fruit of forty years of austere Sadhana?" In disbelief, he now began to examine and inspect in detail, all the signs manifested in the body of Ramakrishna. He particularly examined if his heart was beating and whether there was the smallest amount of breath coming out through his nostrils. He touched and checked his body, which was now in a firm posture like a piece of fixed wood. Seeing no signs of change, nor any return of normal consciousness, Tota, brimming with joy and awe, exclaimed, "Is it in truth Samadhi? Is it the Nirvikalpa Samadhi, the ultimate result attained through the path of knowledge spoken of in the Vedanta? Ah, how very strange is the Maya of the Divine." He then began the process of bringing back his disciple to normal consciousness by chanting out loud the Mantra, "Hari Aum", the sound of which reverberated the entire space around Panchavati.

==== Maya and the Divine Mother ====
After the experience of Nirvikalpa Samadhi, Ramakrishna realised that the great weaver of Maya is none other than Kali, the Divine Mother herself; that she projects it by Her will like a spider that spins a web out of itself, and She can no more be differentiated from Brahman than can the power of burning from fire. Observing Maya as a majestic and enigmatic statement of divinity, he was filled with reverence and love for it, unlike with disdain seen in other realised souls.

He observed that Maya functions in the world in two ways and named them as "Avidya Maya" and "Vidya Maya". Considering Avidya Maya to be represented by the lower forces like evil, greed, cruelty etc., which consign a man to the lower level of existence, and Vidya Maya to be represented by the higher forces like kindness, love and devotion, which elevate a man to the higher levels of existence, Ramakrishna felt that when an individual with the help of Vidya Maya could rid himself of Avidya Maya he would become Mayatita or free of Maya. He realised these two facets of Maya to be the two forces of creation, the two powers of Kali—Who stands beyond both of them, like the beaming sun behind the clouds of different colours and patterns, and shines through them all. Instead of looking upon the world as an illusion created by Brahman as per Vedanta, Ramakrishna looked upon it as the manifestation of the Divine Mother.

He further elaborated his view on the Brahman of Vedanta and the Divine Mother of Tantra thus:

"When I think of the Supreme Being as inactive – neither creating nor preserving nor destroying – I call Him Brahman or Purusha, the Impersonal God. When I think of Him as active – creating, preserving, and destroying – I call Him Sakti or Maya or Prakriti, the Personal God. But the distinction between them does not mean a difference. The Personal and the Impersonal are the same thing, like milk and its whiteness, the diamond and its lustre, the snake and its wriggling motion. It is impossible to conceive of the one without the other. The Divine Mother and Brahman are one."

==== Tota Puri humbled ====
Having seen the rapid progress of Ramakrishna in the Vedantic path, Tota Puri now started to have many serious discussions with him over devotion to the Divine Mother and the Vedantic Brahman. During the course of one such lively discussion, a servant of the temple garden visited them and took a piece of charcoal from the pit of the sacred Dhuni fire, which was then lit by the great ascetic himself to light his own tobacco. At this instance of the unholy act by the servant, Tota flew into rage and began to threaten the man severely; Ramakrishna, who was sitting aside and seeing all this fell onto the ground, rolling in laughter, and remarked how powerful the influence of Maya is over the behaviour of Tota, who was until then talking about how all people are manifestations of Brahman, but forgot everything and got angry at that servant. Tota, feeling embarrassed, vowed never to be angry again. Ramakrishna would go on to say, "Caught in the net of five elements, Brahman weeps" and that no amount of self-knowledge will make the life of a man better until the grace of God is bestowed on him through the power of Maya.

After staying in the Bengal Province for a while, Tota Puri, who until then had never had any illness in his life caught dysentery, which made his life quite miserable. Thinking about taking his leave and moving away, he approached Ramakrishna but every time he did so he would either forget to mention it, or would feel prevented from speaking about it by someone within him, and then would go back hesitantly. Seeing his frail body and knowing about his condition, Ramakrishna with help of Mathur arranged for a special diet and medicines, all to no avail. Being well versed in Meditation, Tota Puri used to merge his mind into Samadhi at will and thus avoid feeling the pain in his body. However, on one night the pain in his intestines became so intense that his mind was no longer able to merge in Samadhi, and he decided to drown his "cage of bones and flesh" in the river Ganga and be free from the consciousness of having body. He thus set out and on reaching a bank of the river, started walking into it and kept walking further, all the way to almost the other side of the bank. Baffled that there seemed to be not enough water in the river to drown himself, he looked back and found, in one dazzling vision, the sight of the divine Mother, the one beyond Turiya, filling up all the space round him. Feeling awe, and realising that the Brahman he had been worshipping all his life was none other than the divine Mother herself, with a grateful heart he turned back, and spent the remaining night meditating on the divine Mother near the dhuni under Panchavati.

When Ramakrishna met Tota in the morning to enquire about his health, he found a totally different person with no more illness. Reflecting on how impudent he was to not accept the divine Mother, Tota explained to him the events that transpired the night before, and that by the grace of the Mother, he was now free from his disease. Ramakrishna, with a smile said, "Well, you did not accept the Mother before and argued with me saying that Shakti was unreal! But you have now seen Her yourself, and direct experience has got the better of your arguments. She has convinced me already of the fact that just as fire and its burning power are not different, so, Brahman and the power of Brahman are not different, but one and the same." Tota then asked Ramakrishna to exhort Her to give him permission to leave, as he now realised that it was Her will that he, who had never spent more than three days at a place, had spent eleven months there. Both of them then visited the temple and Tota, who until then considered the image of the Devi to be a delusion, prostrated himself in front of her idol along with Ramakrishna. A few days later, he took leave and left Dakshineswar. It was his first and the last visit to that place.

=== Perception in samadhi ===
Some time after the departure of Tota Puri from Dakshineswar, Ramakrishna owing to his lack of any restraining elements or desires in the world, decided to dwell in the plane of Nirvikalpa Samadhi. As he attempted to do so, once again the form of the divine Mother, "beautiful, more beautiful than the most", started to appear in front of his mind, and he not having the heart to leave her behind and go ahead, would return. After much internal deliberation, with great courage, Ramakrishna again, while meditating, took up knowledge as the sword and cut her form into two, and then "there was nothing left in the mind then; and it rushed quickly up to the complete Nirvikalapa state."

Ramakrishna remained in the Nirvikalapa state continually for a period of six months, a state of perception said to be from which no ordinary person returns, as the body would then fall dead after twenty-one days, like a dry leaf from a tree. He remained unconscious of the outer world throughout this period, and stayed put like a dead man with matted hair and flies moving through his mouth and nostrils. He might have died then if not for the untiring efforts of an unknown monk who happened to be present in Dakshineswar at the time, and who on recognising the state in which Ramakrishna was, thought his body must be kept alive for the betterment of the world as the work of the Mother is still to be done with it, and made attempts every day to bring it back to awareness by beating him with a stick, and feed him in the resulting fleeting moments of consciousness, which appeared very rarely for a few moments on some days. This period of being in the Nirvikalapa state came to an end after Ramakrishna received a command from the Mother to remain in Bhava Mukha, a state of consciousness bordering between being absorbed into the absolute and remaining in the relative world, for the sake of enlightening people. This was followed by him having an affliction with a severe bout of dysentery. After suffering intense pain in the intestines continually for about six months, his mind gradually returned to the normal plane of consciousness, before that it used to rise and be fixated at the Nirvikalpa state every now and then.

Ramakrishna then firmed his awareness at the sixth chakra of Tantra, and lived with his consciousness oscillating between being either absorbed into the impersonal absolute or remain in personal devotion to the Mother. Later in his life, it was observed that while talking about or listening to subjects related to God, Ramakrishna, with his face beaming a smile and body turning radiant, would become noticeably stiff and unconscious. When one of his disciples asked him why does it happen so and what does he experience in that state? Ramakrishna smiled and replied:

"Well, it is called samadhi, the culmination of meditation. I borrow one-sixteenth part of the mind from the Divine Mother and talk and laugh with you, but the remaining portion rests with the Mother, meditating on her real essence as Existence-Knowledge-Bliss Absolute. When I talk or hear about the Mother, the whole mind goes to the Absolute and samadhi immediately ensues. Do you know what samadhi really is? It is complete absorption in Brahman. Do you know how I feel at that time? Suppose there is a basin of water on the seashore and a fish is confined in it. If the basin is accidentally broken, the fish finds its way to the unfathomable ocean. It then frolics in the height of joy, doesn't it? Similarly, during samadhi my mind leaps out of this body, as it were, and plunges into Existence-Knowledge-Bliss Absolute. Hence the body appears like that. In other words, there is no body-consciousness, and the soul merges in the higher Self — the Paramatman — in the thousand-petalled lotus of the head and experiences unspeakable bliss. That experience sends a wave of divine bliss to the face, and the body becomes radiant. This very self then becomes Shiva, the Absolute."

The periods of Samadhi would later become a regular part in the life of Ramakrishna, and people near him used to find him in a state of Samadhi every now and then, sometimes for almost twenty four hours a day. Once a government official found him remaining in a state of ecstasy for three days and three nights straight. When found deeply absorbed in Samadhi for a long period of time, his devotees would rub cow ghee on his spine, from neck to the lower back, and from the knees down to the soles of his feet, pulling in a downward direction, so as to bring him back to the plane of normal consciousness. Ramakrishna used to say the natural tendency of his mind is towards the Nirvikalpa plane and once in Samadhi, he would not be inclined to come back to the normal plane of consciousness but would return for the sake of his devotees, and sometimes even this will was not enough, so he would fill his mind with trivial desires like, "I will smoke tobacco," "I will drink water," "I will take this," "I will see so and so," "I will talk," and by repeatedly saying such things to his mind, he would make it gradually return to the plane of body consciousness. He would later often tell his devotees to "tie the Knowledge of non-duality in the corner of your cloth and then do whatever you want".

=== Islam and Christianity ===
==== Islam ====
In 1866, Govinda Roy, a Hindu man who was previously initiated into Islam and practised Sufism, initiated Ramakrishna into Islam. Ramakrishna learned about Govinda through the latter's regular visits to Dakshineswar. Being much impressed by seeing the faith and love for God in Govinda, Ramakrishna decided to practice Islam, reasoning: "This also is a path to realisation of God; the sportive mother, the source of infinite Lila, has been blessing many people with the attainment of her lotus feet through this path also. I must see how through it she makes those who take refuge in her, attain their desired end."

Ramakrishna engaged himself in the practice of Islam according to its prescribed rules. He devotedly repeated the name of Allah, and said their prayers five times a day and remained in that state of mind for three days, after which he had full realisation through their path.

During this practice, Ramakrishna had a vision of a luminous figure, and Swami Nikhilananda's biography speculates that the figure was 'perhaps Mohammed'. According to these accounts, Ramakrishna "devoutly repeated the name of Allah, wore a cloth like the Arab Muslims, said their prayer five times daily, and felt disinclined even to see images of the Hindu gods and goddesses, much less worship them—for the Hindu way of thinking had disappeared altogether from my mind." After three days of practice he had a vision of a "radiant personage with grave countenance and white beard resembling the Prophet and merging with his body". He opined this vision to be of the all pervasive Brahman with attributes, as the vision eventually ended with him merging into the attributeless absolute Brahman. Kripal writes that this "would have been a heretical experience through and through" for most Muslims.

After his experience of practicing Islam, Ramakrishna opined that knowledge of Vedanta can make Hindus and Muslims sympathetic to one another as, "There is, as it were, a mountain of difference between them. Their thoughts and faiths, actions and behaviour have remained quite unintelligible to one another in spite of their living together for so long a time."

==== Christianity ====
At the end of 1873, Ramakrishna started the practice of Christianity. After one of his devotees named Sambhu Chandra Mallick read the Bible to him, he got well acquainted with the life and teachings of Jesus.

Once when the Bible was being read out loud to him, from the very beginning there were references to the doctrine of Sin. After hearing a little and finding that it talked of nothing but sin, he refused to listen to it anymore further, saying, "Just as in the case of snakebite, if the patient can be made to believe that there is no poison at all, he will be all right. Similarly, if one constantly thinks, I have taken the name of the Lord, so I am sinless, one becomes pure." He ideated that the more we give up such ideas as "I am sinful", "I am weak", the better it will be for all, as we all are children of God, thus not weak and sinful. He considered thinking of oneself as weak and sinful to be the greatest sin.

In 1874, Ramakrishna experienced a strange vision at the parlour of Jadu Mallik's garden house, situated to the south of Kali temple in Dakshineswar. He was sitting there and looking keenly at a picture of Madonna and Child hanging on the wall, when all of a sudden he saw it come to life with effulgent rays of light emerging from the image and merging into his heart. A few days later, while walking in the Panchavati, he reportedly had a vision of Jesus coming towards him, embracing and merging into his body. At this moment he reportedly lost his normal consciousness, entered into trance and remained for some time identified with the all pervasive Brahman with attributes.

In his own room amongst other divine pictures was one of Christ, and he burnt incense before it morning and evening. There was also a picture showing Jesus Christ saving St Peter from drowning in the water.

== Popularisation and final years ==
=== Keshab Chandra Sen and the "New Dispensation" ===
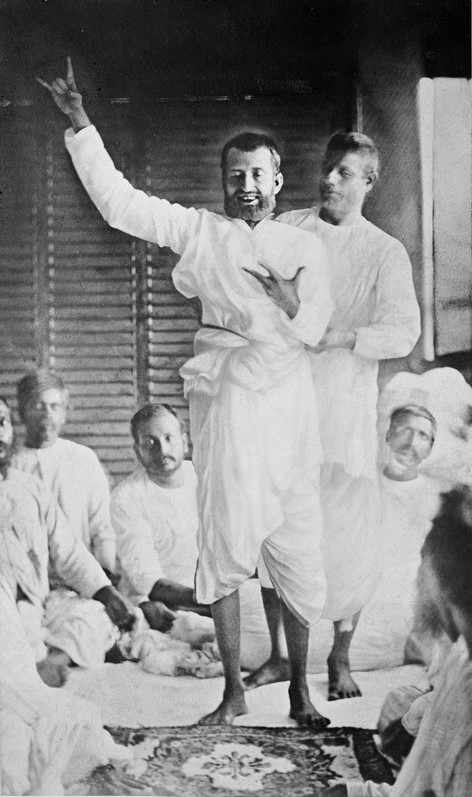
Ramakrishna in bhava samadhi after singing about Kali. His nephew, Hriday, who was supporting him, started uttering "Om" in his ear, bringing him back to normal consciousness, with Brahmo Samaj devotees at the house of Keshub Chandra Sen, 21 September 1879.

In 1875, Ramakrishna met the influential Brahmo Samaj leader Keshab Chandra Sen. Keshab had accepted Christianity, and had separated from the Adi Brahmo Samaj. Formerly, Keshab had rejected idolatry, but under the influence of Ramakrishna he accepted Hindu polytheism and established the "New Dispensation" (Nava Vidhan) religious movement, based on Ramakrishna's principles—"Worship of God as Mother", "All religions as true" and "Assimilation of Hindu polytheism into Brahmoism". Keshab also publicised Ramakrishna's teachings in the journals of New Dispensation over a period of several years, which was instrumental in bringing Ramakrishna to the attention of a wider audience, especially the Bhadralok (English-educated classes of Bengal) and the Europeans residing in India.

Following Keshab, other Brahmos such as Vijaykrishna Goswami started to admire Ramakrishna, propagate his ideals and reorient their socio-religious outlook. Many prominent people of Kolkata—Pratap Chandra Mazumdar, Sivanath Shastri and Trailokyanath Sanyal—began visiting him during this time (1871–1885). Mazumdar wrote the first English biography of Ramakrishna, entitled The Hindu Saint in the Theistic Quarterly Review (1879), which played a vital role in introducing Ramakrishna to Westerners like the German indologist Max Müller. Newspapers reported that Ramakrishna was spreading "Love" and "Devotion" among the educated classes of Kolkata and that he had succeeded in reforming the character of some youths whose morals had been corrupt.

Ramakrishna also had interactions with Debendranath Tagore, the father of Rabindranath Tagore, and Ishwar Chandra Vidyasagar, a renowned social worker. He had also met Swami Dayananda. Ramakrishna is considered one of the main contributors to the Bengali Renaissance.

=== Swami Vivekananda ===
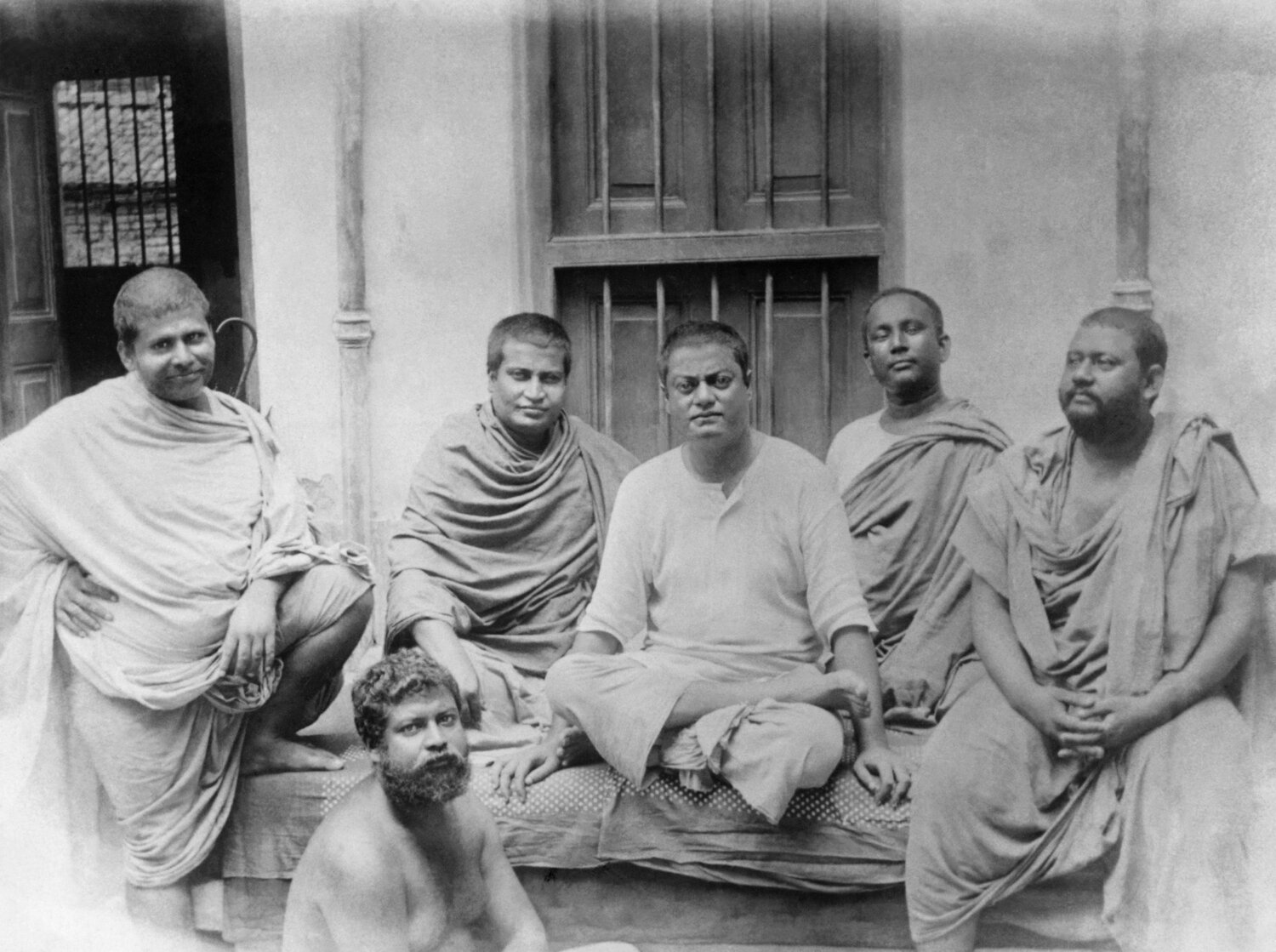
Disciples of Ramakrishna. From left: Trigunatitananda, Shivananda, Vivekananda, Turiyananda, Swami Brahmananda, and (seated below) Swami Sadananda (disciple of Vivekananda).

Among the Europeans who were influenced by Ramakrishna was Principal Dr. William Hastie of the Scottish Church College, Kolkata. In the course of explaining the word trance in the poem The Excursion by William Wordsworth, Hastie told his students that if they wanted to know its "real meaning", they should go to "Ramakrishna of Dakshineswar." This prompted some of his students, including Narendranath Dutta (later Swami Vivekananda), to visit Ramakrishna.

Despite initial reservations, Vivekananda became Ramakrishna's most influential follower, popularising a modern interpretation of Indian traditions which harmonised Tantra, Yoga and Advaita Vedanta. Vivekananda established the Ramakrishna order, which eventually spread its mission posts throughout the world. Monastic disciples, who renounced their family and became the earliest monks of the Ramakrishna order, included Rakhal Chandra Ghosh (Swami Brahmananda), Kaliprasad Chandra (Swami Abhedananda), Taraknath Ghoshal (Swami Shivananda), Sashibhushan Chakravarty (Swami Ramakrishnananda), Saratchandra Chakravarty (Swami Saradananda), Tulasi Charan Dutta (Swami Nirmalananda), Gangadhar Ghatak (Swami Akhandananda), Hari Prasana (Swami Vijnanananda) Swami Turiyananda and others.

=== Other devotees and disciples ===
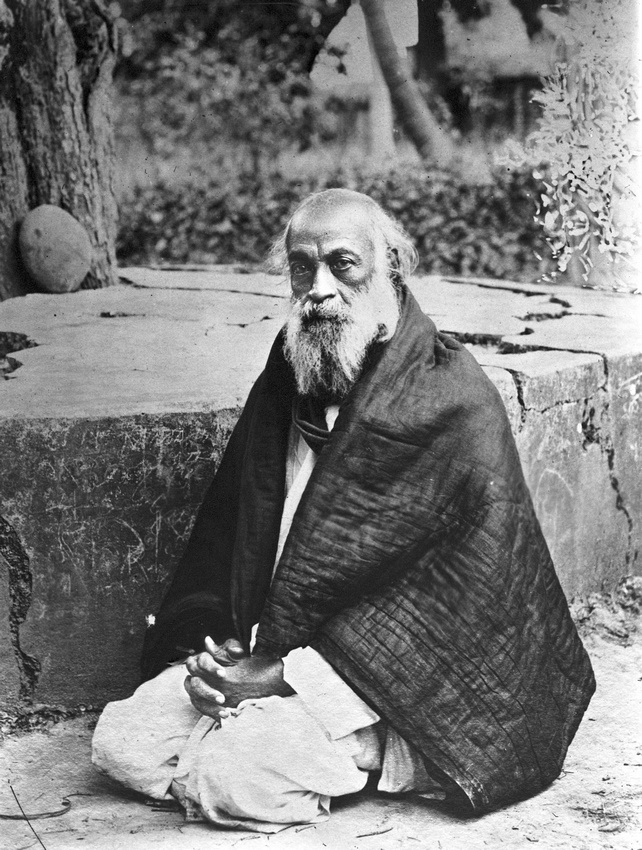
Mahendranath Gupta, a householder devotee and the author of Sri Sri Ramakrishna Kathamrita.

As his name spread, an ever-shifting crowd of all classes and castes visited Ramakrishna. Most of Ramakrishna's prominent disciples came between 1879 and 1885. Apart from the early members who joined the Ramakrishna Order, his chief disciples consisted of:

- Grihasthas or The householders—Mahendranath Gupta, Durga Charan Nag, Girish Chandra Ghosh, Mahendra Lal Sarkar, Akshay Kumar Sen and others.
- A small group of women disciples, including Gauri Ma and Yogin Ma. A few of them were initiated into sanyasa through mantra deeksha. Among the women, Ramakrishna emphasised service to other women rather than tapasya (practice of austerities). Gauri Ma founded the Saradesvari Ashrama at Barrackpur, which was dedicated to the education and upliftment of women.

In preparation for monastic life, Ramakrishna ordered his monastic disciples to beg their food from door to door without distinction of caste. He gave them the saffron robe, the sign of the Sanyasi, and initiated them with Mantra Deeksha.

=== Last days ===
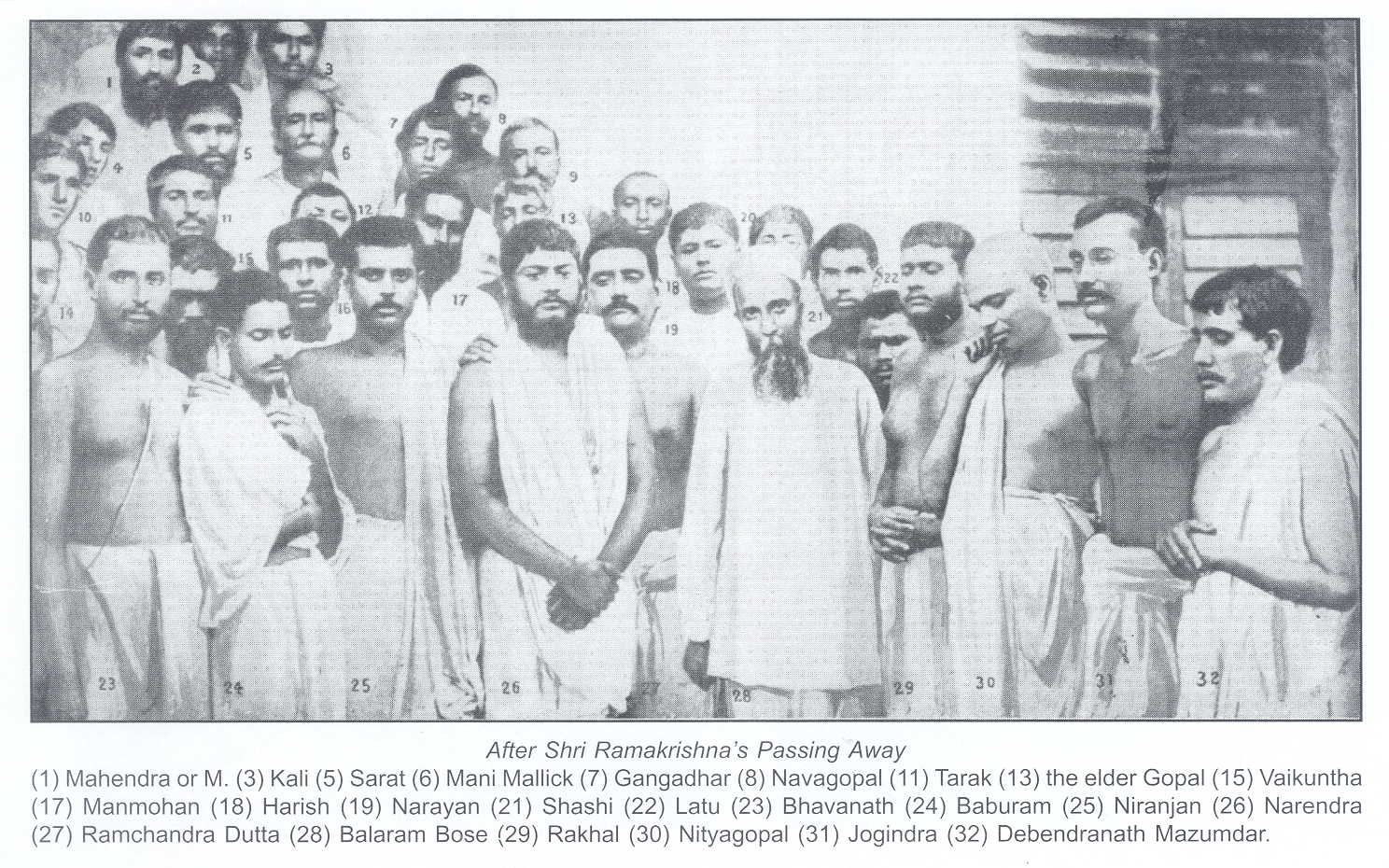
Various disciples and devotees of Ramakrishna at his funeral.

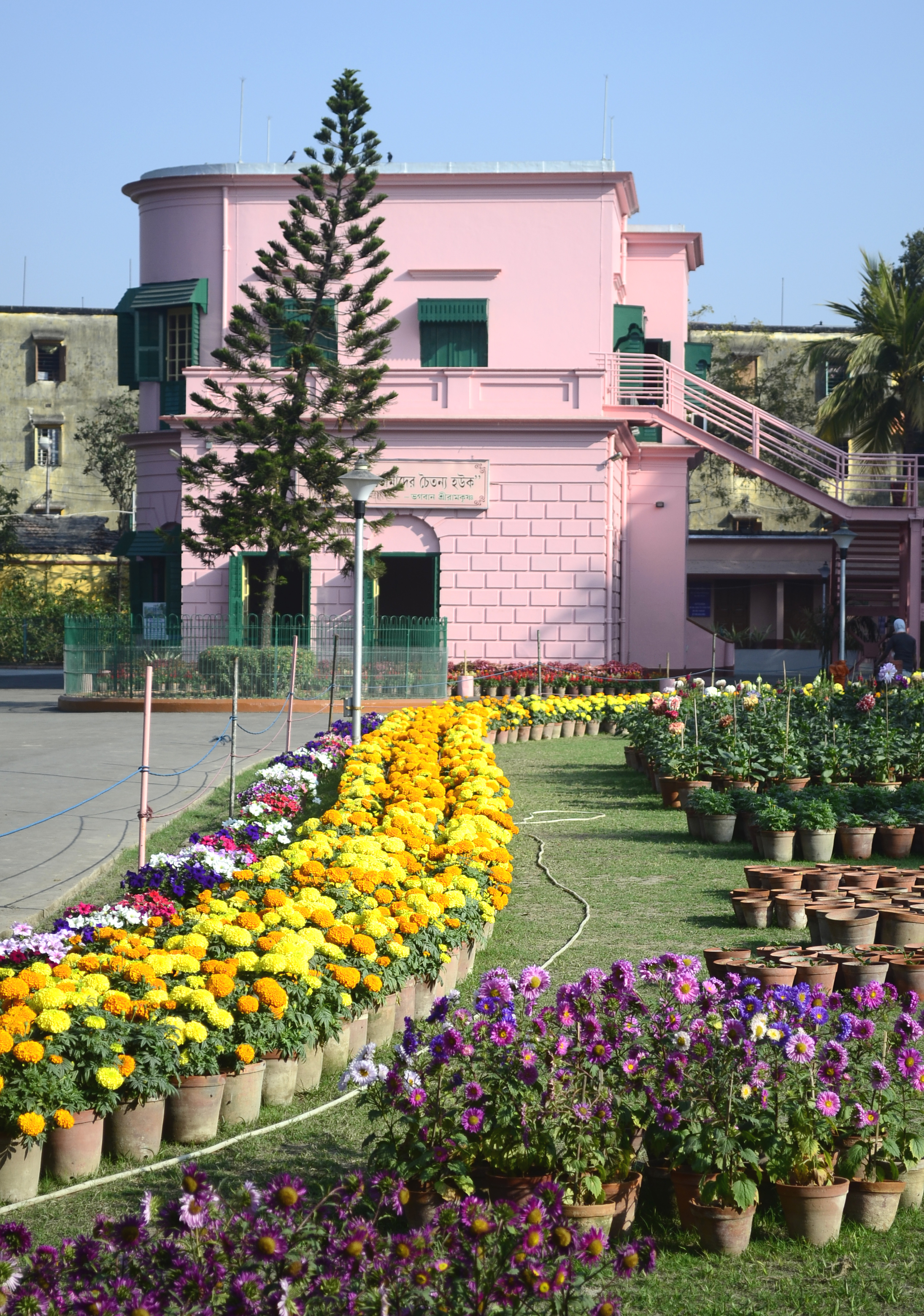
Cossipore Udyan Bari (Cossipore Garden House) where Ramakrishna died & spent last year of his life

In the beginning of 1885 Ramakrishna suffered from clergyman's throat, which gradually developed into throat cancer. He was moved to Shyampukur near Kolkata, where some of the best physicians of the time, including Dr. Mahendralal Sarkar, were engaged. When his condition aggravated, he was relocated to a large garden house at Cossipore on 11 December 1885.

During his last days, he was looked after by his monastic disciples and Sarada Devi. Ramakrishna was advised by the doctors to keep the strictest silence, but ignoring their advice, he incessantly conversed with visitors. According to traditional accounts, before his death, Ramakrishna transferred his spiritual powers to Vivekananda, and assured him of his avataric status. Requesting other monastic disciples to look upon Vivekananda as their leader, Ramakrishna asked Vivekananda to look after the welfare of the disciples, saying, "keep my boys together", and asked him to "teach them".

Ramakrishna's condition gradually worsened, and he died in the early morning hours of 16 August 1886 at the Cossipore garden house. According to his disciples, this was mahasamadhi. His last word, on one account was "ma", while another states he uttered "Kali" thrice before dying.

After the death of their master, the monastic disciples led by Vivekananda formed a fellowship at a half-ruined house at Baranagar near the river Ganges, with the financial assistance of the householder disciples. This became the first Math or monastery of the disciples who constituted the first Ramakrishna Order.

== Reception and teachings ==
In the Gospel of Ramakrishna, he spoke to two different classes of people seeking instruction from him. For monks and those on the monastic path, he spoke of non-dual Vedanta, but to householders, he advised that they not follow Advaita Vedanta, but rather the bhakti path:

For those who lead a householder's life, and those who identify with the body, the attitude of "I am He" is not good... householders should look on God as their master and themselves as His servant.

Max Müller (Note: In his influential 1896 essay "A real mahatma: Sri Ramakrishna Paramahansa Dev" and his 1899 book Râmakrishna: His Life and Sayings.) portrayed Ramakrishna as, "...a Bhakta, a worshipper or lover of the deity, much more than a Gñânin or a knower." Postcolonial literary theorist Gayatri Chakravorty Spivak wrote that Ramakrishna was a "Bengali bhakta visionary" and that as a bhakta, "he turned chiefly towards Kali."

Indologist Heinrich Zimmer was the first Western scholar to interpret Ramakrishna's worship of the Divine Mother as containing specifically Tantric elements. Neeval also argued that tantra played a main role in Ramakrishna's spiritual development.

=== Transformation into neo-Vedantin ===
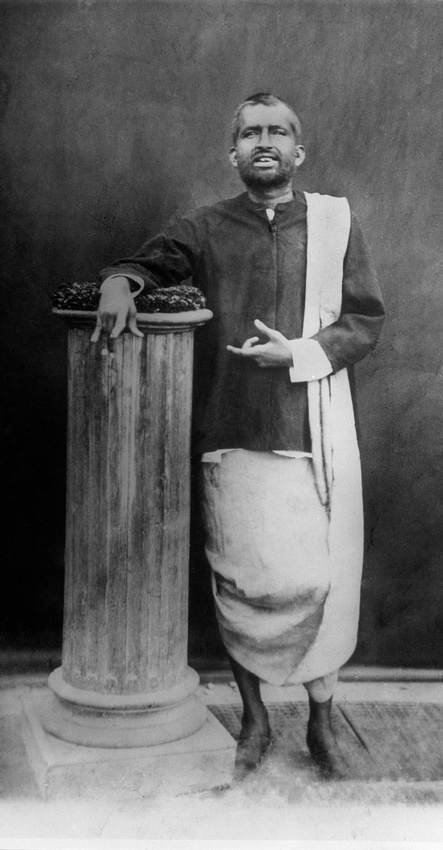
Photograph of Ramakrishna, taken on 10 December 1881 at the studio of "The Bengal Photographers" in Radhabazar, Calcutta (Kolkata).

Vivekananda portrayed Ramakrishna as an Advaita Vedantin. Vivekananda's approach can be located in the historical background of Ramakrishna and Calcutta during the mid-19th century. Neevel notes that the image of Ramakrishna underwent several transformations in the writings of his prominent admirers, who changed the 'religious madman' into a calm and well-behaving proponent of Advaita Vedanta. Narasingha Sil has argued that Vivekananda revised and mythologised Ramakrishna's image after Ramakrishna's death. McDaniel notes that the Ramakrishna Mission is biased towards Advaita Vedanta, and downplays the importance of Shaktism in Ramakrishna's spirituality. Malcolm McLean argued that the Ramakrishna Movement presents "a particular kind of explanation of Ramakrishna, that he was some kind of neo-Vedantist who taught that all religions lead to the same Godhead."

Another set of commentators suggest that his philosophy is best understood as a nonsectarian Vedanta, which reconciles various philosophical perspectives. Commentators such as Satis Chandra Chatterjee and Jeffery Long have described Ramakrishna's philosophy as a harmonising form of Vedanta, using terms like "Samanvayi Vedanta" or "Integral Vedanta". Ayon Maharaj, also known as Swami Medhananda, supports these scholars' view, proposing that Ramakrishna's teachings are best understood through a nonsectarian Vedantic framework, specifically characterising his philosophy as "Vijnana Vedanta".

Carl Olson argued that in his presentation of his master, Vivekananda had hid much of Ramakrishna's embarrassing sexual oddities from the public, because he feared that Ramakrishna would be misunderstood. Tyagananda and Vrajaprana argue that Oslon makes his "astonishing claim" based on Kripal's speculations in Kali's Child, which they argue are unsupported by any of the source texts.

Sumit Sarkar argued that he found in the Kathamrita traces of a binary opposition between unlearned oral wisdom and learned literate knowledge. He argues that all of our information about Ramakrishna, a rustic near-illiterate Brahmin, comes from urban bhadralok devotees, "...whose texts simultaneously illuminate and transform."

Amiya Prosad Sen criticises Neevel's analysis, and writes that "it is really difficult to separate the Tantrik Ramakrishna from the Vedantic", since Vedanta and Tantra "may appear to be different in some respects", but they also "share some important postulates between them".

=== Analysis of samadhi ===
From his 10th or 11th year of school, trances became a common part of his life, and by his final years Ramakrishna's samadhi periods occurred almost daily. Early on, these experiences have been interpreted as epileptic seizures, an interpretation which was rejected by Ramakrishna himself. (Note: According to Anil D. Desai, Ramakrishna suffered from psychomotor epilepsy, also called temporal lobe epilepsy. See Devinsky, J.; Schachter, S. (2009). "Norman Geschwind's contribution to the understanding of behavioral changes in temporal lobe epilepsy: The February 1974 lecture". Epilepsy & Behavior. 15 (4): 417–24. doi:10.1016/j.yebeh.2009.06.006. PMID 19640791. S2CID 22179745. for a description of characteristics of Temporal Lobe Epilepsy, including increased religiosity as "a very striking feature." See also Geschwind syndrome, for descriptions of behavioral phenomena evident in some temporal lobe epilepsy patients, and Jess Hill Finding God in a seizure: the link between temporal lobe epilepsy and mysticism for some first-hand descriptions of epilepsy-induced "visions and trance-like states.")

=== Psychoanalysis ===
In 1927 Romain Rolland discussed with Sigmund Freud the "oceanic feeling" described by Ramakrishna. Sudhir Kakar (1991), Jeffrey Kripal (1995), and Narasingha Sil (1998), analysed Ramakrishna's mysticism and religious practices using psychoanalysis, arguing that his mystical visions, refusal to comply with ritual copulation in Tantra, Madhura Bhava, and criticism of Kamini-Kanchana (women and gold) reflect homosexuality.

==== Romain Rolland and the "Oceanic feeling" ====
The dialogue on psychoanalysis and Ramakrishna began in 1927 when Sigmund Freud's friend Romain Rolland wrote to him that he should consider spiritual experiences, or "the oceanic feeling", in his psychological works. Rolland described the trances and mystical states experienced by Ramakrishna and other mystics as an "'oceanic' sentiment", one which Rolland had also experienced. Rolland believed that the universal human religious emotion resembled this "oceanic sense". In his 1929 book La vie de Ramakrishna, Rolland distinguished between the feelings of unity and eternity which Ramakrishna experienced in his mystical states and Ramakrishna's interpretation of those feelings as the goddess Kali.

==== The Analyst and the Mystic ====
In his 1991 book The Analyst and the Mystic, Indian psychoanalyst Sudhir Kakar saw in Ramakrishna's visions a spontaneous capacity for creative experiencing. Kakar also argued that culturally relative concepts of eroticism and gender have contributed to the Western difficulty in comprehending Ramakrishna. Kakar saw Ramakrishna's seemingly bizarre acts as part of a bhakti path to God.

==== Kali's Child ====
In 1995, Jeffrey J. Kripal in his controversial Kali's Child: The Mystical and the Erotic in the Life and Teachings of Ramakrishna, an interdisciplinary study of Ramakrishna's life "using a range of theoretical models", most notably psychoanalysis, argued that Ramakrishna's mystical experiences could be seen as symptoms of repressed homoeroticism, "legitimat[ing] Ramakrishna's religious visions by situating psychoanalytic discourse in a wider Tantric worldview". Jeffrey J. Kripal argued that Ramakrishna rejected Advaita Vedanta in favour of Shakti Tantra.

Kripal also argued in Kali's Child that the Ramakrishna Movement had manipulated Ramakrishna's biographical documents and that they published them in incomplete and bowdlerised editions (claiming, among other things, hiding Ramakrishna's homoerotic tendencies), and that the Movement had suppressed Ram Chandra Datta's Srisriramakrsna Paramahamsadever Jivanavrttanta.

These views were disputed by several authors, scholars, and psychoanalysts, including Alan Roland, Kelly Aan Raab, Somnath Bhattacharyya, J.S. Hawley, and Swami Atmajnanananda, who wrote that Jivanavrttanta had been reprinted nine times in Bengali as of 1995.

Jeffrey Kripal translates the phrase kamini-kanchana as lover and gold. The literal translation is women and gold. In Ramakrishna's view, lust and greed are obstacles to God-realisation. Kripal associates his translation of the phrase with Ramakrishna's alleged disgust for women as lovers. Swami Tyagananda considered this to be a "linguistic misconstruction." Ramakrishna also cautioned his women disciples against purusa-kanchana ("man and gold") and Tyagananda writes that Ramakrishna used Kamini-Kanchana as "cautionary words" instructing his disciples to conquer the "lust inside the mind". (Note: Partha Chatterjee wrote that the figure of a woman stands for concepts or entities that have "little to do with women in actuality" and "the figure of woman-and-gold signified the enemy within: that part of one's own self which was susceptible to the temptations of ever-unreliable worldly success". Carl T. Jackson interprets kamini-kanchana to refer to the idea of sex and the idea of money as delusions which prevent people from realising God.)

The application of psychoanalysis has further been disputed by Tyagananda and Vrajaprana as being unreliable in understanding Tantra and interpreting cross-cultural contexts in Interpreting Ramakrishna: Kali's Child Revisited (2010).

=== Teachings ===
The principal source for Ramakrishna's teaching is Mahendranath Gupta's Sri Sri Ramakrishna Kathamrita, which is regarded as a Bengali classic and "the central text of the tradition". Gupta used the pen name "M", as the author of the Gospel. The text was published in five volumes from 1902 to 1932. Based on Gupta's diary notes, each of the five volumes purports to document Ramakrishna's life from 1882 to 1886.

The most popular English translation of the Kathamrita is The Gospel of Sri Ramakrishna by Swami Nikhilananda. Nikhilananda's translation rearranged the scenes in the five volumes of the Kathamrita into a linear sequence. Swami Nikhilananda worked with Margaret Woodrow Wilson, daughter of President Woodrow Wilson, who helped the swami to refine his literary style into "flowing American English". The mystic hymns were rendered into free verse by the American poet John Moffitt. Wilson and American mythology scholar Joseph Campbell helped edit the manuscript. Aldous Huxley wrote in his Forward to the Gospel, "...'M' produced a book unique, so far as my knowledge goes, in the literature of hagiography. Never have the casual and unstudied utterances of a great religious teacher been set down with so minute detail." Philosopher Lex Hixon writes that The Gospel of Ramakrishna is "spiritually authentic" and a "powerful rendering of the Kathamrita". Malcolm Mclean and Jeffrey Kripal both argue that the translation is unreliable, though Kripal's interpretation is criticised by Hugh Urban.

Ramakrishna's teachings were imparted in rustic Bengali, using stories and parables. These teachings made a powerful impact on Kolkata's intellectuals, despite the fact that his ideas were far removed from issues of modernism or national independence. According to contemporary reports, Ramakrishna's linguistic style was unique, even to those who spoke Bengali. It contained obscure local words and idioms from village Bengali, interspersed with philosophical Sanskrit terms and references to the Vedas, Puranas, and Tantras. For that reason, according to philosopher Lex Hixon, his speeches cannot be literally translated into English or any other language. Scholar Amiya P. Sen argued that certain terms that Ramakrishna may have used only in a metaphysical sense are being improperly invested with new, contemporaneous meanings.

Ramakrishna's primary biographers describe him as talkative and would reminisce for hours about his own eventful spiritual life, tell tales, explain Vedantic doctrines with humorous, and at times colorful illustrations, raising questions and answering them himself, crack jokes, sing songs, and mimic the ways of all types of worldly people, keeping the visitors enthralled. As an example of Ramakrishna's teachings and fun with his followers, here's a quote about his visit to an exhibition,

“I once visited the MUSEUM (Note: The word MUSEUM is in all caps to indicate it was said in English.) There was a display of fossils: living animals had turned into stone. Just look at the power of association! Imagine what would happen if you constantly kept the company of the holy.” Mani Mallick replied (laughing): “If you would go there again we could have ten to fifteen more years of spiritual instructions.”

Ramakrishna's views of other religions and sects were very liberal. He believed all paths led to God, as demonstrated in this exchange from the Gospel:

Master: “You see how many opinions there are about God. Each opinion is a path. There are innumerable opinions and innumerable paths leading to God.”

Bhavanath: “Then what should we do?”

Master: “You must stick to one path with all your strength. A man can reach the roof of a house by stone stairs or ladder or a rope-ladder or a rope or even by a bamboo pole. But he cannot reach the roof if he sets foot now on one and now on another. He should follow one path. Likewise, in order to realise God a man must follow one path with all his strength.

And here is an example of his using off-color language to make a point. On Tuesday December 18, 1883, Ramakrishna and a few of his close followers made a visit to the Kolkata home of a very wealthy devotee.

From the temple the Master went to Jadu Mallick's house. Jadu was surrounded by admirers, well-dressed dandies. He welcomed the master.

Master (with a smile): "Why do you keep so many clowns and flatterers with you?"

Jadu (smiling): "That you may liberate them." (Laughter.)

Master: "Flatters think that the rich man will loosen his purse-strings for them. But it is very difficult to get anything from him. Once a jackal saw a bullock and would not give up his company. The bullock roamed about and the jackal followed him. The jackal thought, 'There hang the bullock's testicles. Some time or other they will drop to the ground and I shall eat them.' When the bullock slept on the ground, the jackal lay down too, and when the bullock moved about, the jackal followed him. Many days passed in this way, but the bullock's testicles still clung to his body. The jackal went away disappointed. (All laugh.) That also happens to flatterers."

Ramakrishna was skilled with words and had an extraordinary style of preaching and instructing, which may have helped convey his ideas to even the most skeptical temple visitors. His speeches reportedly revealed a sense of joy and fun, but he was not at a loss when debating with intellectual philosophers. Philosopher Arindam Chakrabarti contrasted Ramakrishna's talkativeness with the Buddha's legendary reticence, and compared his teaching style to that of Socrates.

Ramakrishna's religious practice and worldview, contained elements of Bhakti, Tantra and Vedanta. Ramakrishna emphasised God-realisation, stating that "To realise God is the one goal in life." Ramakrishna found that Hinduism, Christianity and Islam all move towards the same God or divine, though using different ways: "So many religions, so many paths to reach one and the same goal," namely to experience God or Divine. Ramakrishna further said, "All scriptures – the Vedas, the Puranas, the Tantras – seek Him alone and no one else." The Vedic phrase "Truth is one; only It is called by different names," (Note: Referring to Rig Veda Samhita 1.164.46: "They call him Indra, Mitra, Varuna, Agni, and he is heavenly nobly-winged Garutman. To what is One, sages give many a title. They call it Agni, Yama, Matarisvan.". Compare William A. Graham, who states that "the one" in verse 1.164.46 refers to Vāc, goddess of speech, appearing as "the creative force and absolute force in the universe." In later Vedic literature, "Speech or utterance is also identified with the supreme power or transcendent reality," and "equated with Brahman in this sense.") became a stock phrase to express Ramakrishna's inclusivism.

Ramakrishna preferred "the duality of adoring a Divinity beyond himself to the self-annihilating immersion of nirvikalpa samadhi, and he helped "bring to the realm of Eastern energetics and realisation the daemonic celebration that the human is always between a reality it has not yet attained and a reality to which it is no longer limited." Ramakrishna is quoted in the Nikhilananda Gospel, "The devotee of God wants to eat sugar, and not to become sugar."

Ramakrishna taught that yatra jiv tatra Shiv (wherever there is a living being, there is Shiva). His teaching, "Jive daya noy, Shiv gyane jiv seba" (not kindness to living beings, but serving the living being as Shiva Himself) is considered the inspiration for the philanthropic work carried out by his chief disciple Vivekananda.

In the Kolkata scene of the mid to late nineteenth century, Ramakrishna was opinionated on the subject of Chakri. Chakri can be described as a type of low-paying servitude done by educated men—typically government or commerce-related clerical positions. On a basic level, Ramakrishna saw this system as a corrupt form of European social organisation that forced educated men to be servants not only to their bosses at the office, but also to their wives at home. What Ramakrishna saw as the primary detriment of Chakri, however, was that it forced workers into a rigid, impersonal clock-based time structure. He saw the imposition of strict adherence to each second on the watch as a roadblock to spirituality. Despite this, however, Ramakrishna demonstrated that Bhakti could be practised as an inner retreat to experience solace in the face of Western-style discipline and often discrimination in the workplace.

His spiritual movement indirectly aided nationalism, as it rejected caste distinctions and religious prejudices.

== Influence and legacy ==
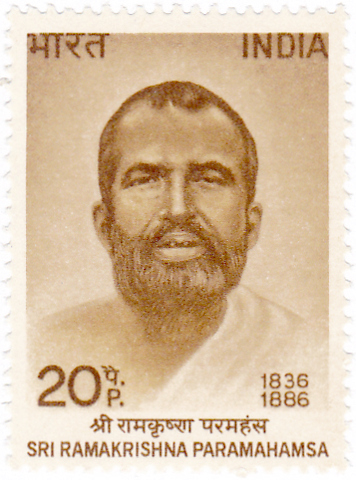
Ramakrishna Paramahamsa 1973 stamp of India

Ramakrishna is considered an important figure in the Bengali Renaissance of 19th–20th century. In 2006, minimalist American composer wrote The Passion of Ramakrishna for Chorus and Orchestra. Commissioned by the Pacific Symphony and the Nashville Symphony Orchestra, it was published by Dunvagen Music Publishers Inc., Glass' publishing and management company.

Several organisations have been established in his name. The Ramakrishna Math and Mission is the main organisation founded by Swami Vivekananda in 1897. The Mission conducts extensive work in health care, disaster relief, rural management, tribal welfare, elementary and higher education. The movement is considered one of the revitalisation movements of India. Amiya Sen writes that Vivekananda's "social service gospel" stemmed from direct inspiration from Ramakrishna and rests substantially on the "liminal quality" of the Master's message.

Other organisations include the Ramakrishna Vedanta Society founded by Swami Abhedananda in 1923, the Ramakrishna Sarada Math founded by a rebel group in 1929, the Ramakrishna Vivekananda Mission formed by Swami Nityananda in 1976, and the Sri Sarada Math and Ramakrishna Sarada Mission founded in 1959 as a sister organisation by the Ramakrishna Math and Mission.

== See also ==
- List of Hindu gurus and saints
