= Lex Hixon =

American spiritualist (1941–1995)

- Born: December 25, 1941; Pasadena, California, US
- Died: November 1, 1995 (aged 53); Riverdale, New York, US

Lex Hixon (born Alexander Paul Hixon Junior, also known as Nur al-Anwar al-Jerrahi in the Sufi community; 1941–1995) was an American Sufi author, poet, and spiritual teacher. He practiced and held membership in several religious traditions. He believed that all religions are true, which was sparked by his study of the life and teachings of Ramakrishna.

== Life and education ==
Hixon was born on December 25, 1941, in Pasadena, California, one of three sons of Alexander and Adelaide Hixon. He married his second wife, Sheila, in 1965. They had two daughters Shanti, India, and one son, Dylan. Hixon also had a daughter, Alexandra, from a previous marriage to Margaret Taylor. He graduated from Yale University in 1963, where he majored in philosophy, and he received a PhD in comparative religion from Columbia University in 1976. His doctoral thesis was on the Gaudapada Karika, a Sanskrit scripture of the very early Advaita Vedanta school of Hindu philosophy.

== Early spiritual training ==
Hixon first studied prayer and meditation at the age of nineteen with Vine Deloria, Senior, a Lakota Sioux elder and Episcopal priest in Pierre, South Dakota. In 1966 he began his discipleship with Swami Nikhilananda of the Ramakrishna Mission, who headed the Ramakrishna-Vivekananda Center of New York. He simultaneously remained involved in various religions, calling them "parallel sacred worlds".

== Radio ==
From 1971 to 1984, Lex Hixon hosted a weekly 2-hour interview show in New York City called "In The Spirit," where he interviewed hundreds of spiritual leaders and teachers from different traditions, including Alan Wilson Watts,philosopher, writer and speaker known for interpreting and popularizing Indian and Chinese traditions of Buddhist, Taoist, and Hindu philosophy for a Western audience. Buddhism — the Dalai Lama, the 16th Karmapa, Kalu Rinpoche, Lama Ole Nydahl, Zen teacher Maezumi Roshi and Sensei Bernie Glassman; Ch'an Master, Ven. Sheng Yen; Christianity — Brother David Steindl-Rast, Father Thomas Keating, Mother Teresa of Calcutta; Hinduism —Hilda Charlton, J. Krishnamurti, Swami Satchidananda, Swami Muktananda; Islam — Sheikh Muzaffer Ozak, Pir Vilayat Inayat Khan, Bawa Muhaiyaddeen; Judaism — Rabbi Shlomo Carlebach, Rabbi Gedaliah Kenig, Rabbi Dovid Din, Rabbi Aryeh Kaplan and Rabbi Meyer Fund. These were later published by his wife as a stand-alone book.

== Religious traditions ==
=== Islam and Sufism ===
On one of the shows, he met Sheikh Muzaffer Özak Âșkî al-Jerrahi, who became his master and guide in the Sufi path. He embraced Lex as his spiritual son, and gave him the name Nur, divine light. Sheikh Muzaffer appointed him as the head of the community of American dervishes who gathered in the Masjid al-Farah in New York City.

=== Christianity ===
Hixon and his wife Sheila entered the Eastern Orthodox Church through the inspiration of Father Alexander Schmemann and studied at St. Vladimir's Seminary in Crestwood, New York, for three years. He also traveled to Mount Athos.

=== Buddhism ===
Hixon and his wife received guidance in meditation from Venerable Lama Domo Geshe Rimpoche. Hixon studied Zen koans with Tetsugen Bernard Glassman, and Glassman posthumously ordained him as a Zen sensei.

=== Hinduism ===
Hixon studied meditation with Swamis Prabhavananda and Aseshananda.

== Arts ==
Hixon studied flamenco guitar with Carlos Montoya and studied classical Indian music with Vasant Rai, the sarod master.

== Books ==
- Coming Home: The Experience of Enlightenment in Sacred Traditions, 1978, 1989, 1995. ISBN 0-943914-74-4
- The Heart of the Qur'an: An Introduction to Islamic Spirituality, 1988, 2003. ISBN 0-8356-0822-0
- Recolección de la Miel (Gathering Honey), 1989. ISBN
- Great Swan: Meetings with Ramakrishna, 1992, 2002. ISBN 81-208-1297-2
- Atom from the Sun of Knowledge, 1993. ISBN 978-1-879708-05-1
- Illahis of Shaykh Nur al-Jerrahi, 1993. ISBN
- Mother of the Buddhas: Meditation on the Prajnaparamita Sutra, 1993. ISBN 0-8356-0689-9
- Mother of the Universe: Visions of the Goddess and Tantric Hymns of Enlightenment, 1994. ISBN 0-8356-0702-X
- Living Buddha Zen, 1995. ISBN 0-943914-75-2
- Sufi Meditation, 1997. ISBN 1-879708-10-8
- 101 Diamonds: From the Oral Tradition of the Glorious Messenger Muhammad (translator, with Fariha al-Jerrahi), 2001. ISBN 1-879708-17-5
- Hixon, Sheila, ed. (2016). Conversations In the Spirit: Lex Hixon's WBAI "In the Spirit" interviews: a chronicle of the seventies spiritual revolution (1st [edition] ed.). Rhinebeck, New York: Monkfish Book Publishing Company. ISBN 978-1-939681-53-9.

== Death ==
Hixon died of cancer at his home in Riverdale, New York, on November 1, 1995, at the age of 53.

== Sources ==
- New York Times obituary, November 9, 1995
- Yoga Journal Interview, Jan/Feb 1991
- Zen Peacemakers website
- Coming Home, 1989 & 1995 (2nd & 3rd Editions) biographical note (note differs in each edition).
- Free Spirit Journal, April & May 1996: Article by Cassia Berman. (reproduced online here)
