= Who Are We? (album) =

Live album (lecture) by Aldous Huxley
- Released: 2008
- Recorded: 1955, Hollywood Temple of the Vedanta Society of Southern California
- Genre: Spoken word
- Label: GemsTone distributed by mondayMEDIA

Who Are We? is a 1955 recording of Aldous Huxley giving a lecture at the Vedanta Society of Southern California's Hollywood temple. The lecture was originally recorded on a wire recorder and digitally transferred to CD. Huxley was a student of Swami Prabhavananda, who founded the Society. Along with Christopher Isherwood and other notable disciples of the Swami, Huxley would occasionally give lectures at the society's temples in Hollywood and Santa Barbara.

In the lecture, Huxley goes into some depth about core issues about human existence, asking the primal question: what is our true nature. Included in the CD is a recording of a question and answer session between Huxley and the audience held after the lecture. The lecture was given just a year after the publication of Huxley's book, The Doors of Perception, and he discusses the significance of the drug experience.

In 1955, the same year as the lecture recording, an article with the same title based on the lecture was published in Vedanta and the West, the bi-monthly magazine produced by the Vedanta Society of Southern California.

The recording was licensed by mondayMEDIA from Vedanta Press and released on the GemsTone label.
