= Who Are We? =

Who Are We? may refer to:

- Who are we?, one of the more typical questions about the meaning of life
- Who Are We? The Challenges to America's National Identity, a 2004 book by Samuel P. Huntington
- Who Are We? (album), a 1955 recording of Aldous Huxley giving a lecture
