= Swami Swahananda =

Personal life
- Born: 29 June 1921
- Died: 19 October 2012 (aged 91)
- Education: B.A. from Murari Chand College, Sylhet, in 1943, and a double M.A. in English Literature and English Language from the University of Calcutta, in 1945 and 46

Religious life
- Religion: Hinduism
- Philosophy: Advaita Vedanta

Religious career
- Teacher: Swami Vijnanananda

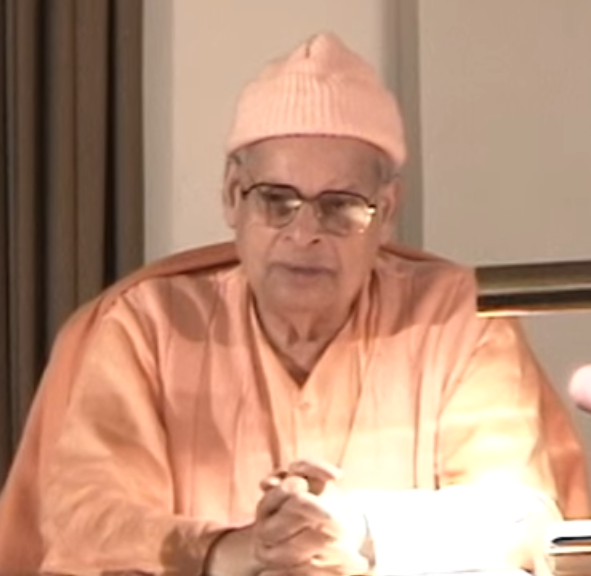
Swami Swahananda

Swami Swahananda (29 June 1921 – 19 October 2012) was a senior monk of the Ramakrishna Order, and the minister and spiritual leader of the Vedanta Society of Southern California from 1976 to 2012. He also led the Vivekananda Retreat, Ridgely, and the Vedanta Center of Greater Washington, D.C. He joined the Ramakrishna Order in 1947 and received sannyasa, full monastic ordination, in 1956.

== Early life and education ==
Swami Swahananda was born on 29 June 1921 in a village near Habiganj in British India, now in Bangladesh, the youngest of three boys. His father, Nirmal Chandra Goswami, died in April 1921 at the age of 32, just two months before Swahananda was born. His mother, Pramilabala, was only 19 at that time. Swahananda's grandmother named him "Bipadbhanjan". Nirmal Chandra had been a disciple of Sarada Devi, and had received initiation from her in 1908. Swahananda received a B.A. from Murari Chand College, Sylhet, in 1943, and a double M.A. in English Literature and English Language from the University of Calcutta, in 1945 and 46.

== Religious life ==
He received initiation in February 1937 from Swami Vijnanananda, a direct disciple of Sri Ramakrishna, and subsequently joined the Ramakrishna Order in 1947. He remained a lecturer at the Vidyamandir at Belur Math for two years, before being sent to the Ramakrishna Math, Madras (now Chennai). He was ordained a brahmacharin in 1952, and was called Brahmachari Durgachaitanya. In 1954, he joined the Mysore Study Circle. He received sannyasa, full ordination, in 1956, from Swami Shankarananda.

At the Madras Math he served first as pujari, and as editor of the Vedanta Kesari from August 1956 to April 1962. In 1961, he went on pilgrimage in the Himalayas, and stayed at Uttarkashi to practice spiritual austerities for some months. In 1962, he was made the head of the Ramakrishna Mission center in New Delhi, an important centre of the Ramakrishna Order. He came to the United States on 5 August 1968, to be the Assistant Minister of the San Francisco Vedanta Society, where he served for two years; later he was appointed head of the Vedanta Society of Berkeley, California, where he stayed for six years. In December 1976, after the death of spiritual leader and author Swami Prabhavananda, he was transferred to Hollywood, the headquarters of the Vedanta Society of Southern California, where he remained the minister until his death. He also supervised the Vedanta Society of Greater Washington, D.C., since 1997, and Vivekananda Retreat, Ridgely, since 1998. In the late 1980s, he lectured and gave spiritual guidance in Moscow. As a spiritual leader, Swahananda encouraged westerners to take leadership roles in the Vedanta movement.

Swami Swahananda ji died on 19 October 2012, at the age of 91 at 2:52 pm, PST. He suffered a brain stem stroke. After several tests and consultations with doctors, it was determined that his condition was irreversible, and life support was removed per his wishes.

== Author ==
Swami Swahananda authored a number of books and translations. His translations into English include the Chandogya Upanishad and Panchadasi of Vidyaranya from Sanskrit, and Go Forward: Letters of Swami Premeshananda and Mahapurush Maharaj as We Knew Him from Bengali. Books include Hindu Symbology and Other Essays, Meditation and Other Spiritual Disciplines, Mother Worship: A Collection of Essays on Mother Worship in India, Service and Spirituality, Vedanta and Ramakrishna, Vedanta and Holy Mother, Vedanta and Vivekananda, and Vedanta Sadhana and Shakti Puja.
