= Vedanta Society Of Southern California, Ramakrishna Monastery =

Ramakrishna Monastery
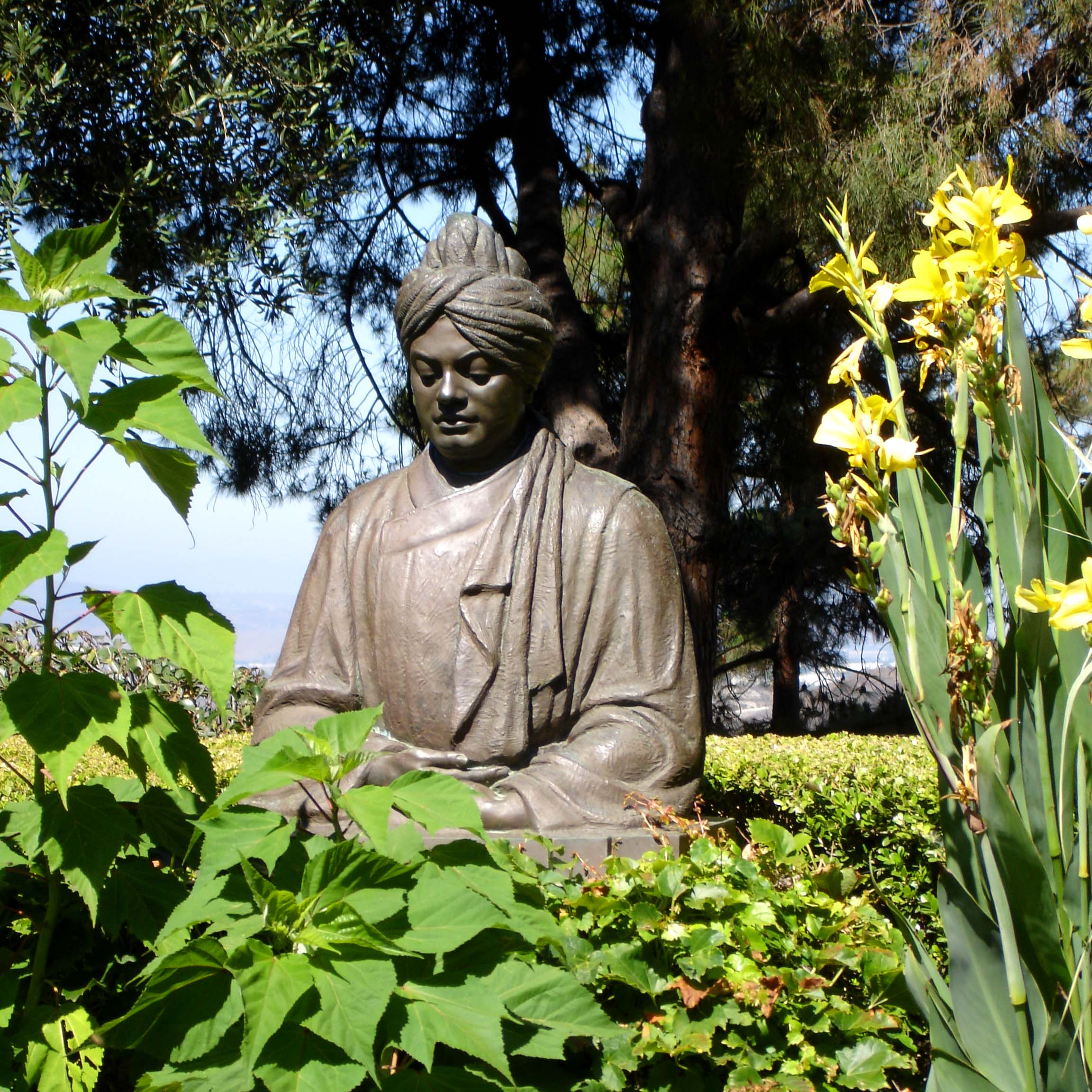
- Swami Vivekananda statue at the Ramakrishna Monastery, California

Religion
- Affiliation: Ramakrishna Order
- Region: Orange County
- Ecclesiastical or organizational status: Active
- Year consecrated: 1949

Location
- Location: 19961 Live Oak Canyon Road, Trabuco Canyon, California
- State: California
- Interactive map of Ramakrishna Monastery
- Coordinates: 33.6734°N 117.6101°W

Architecture
- Architect: Felix Greene
- Style: 18th Century Mediterranean Monastery

Website
- vedanta.org/trabuco-canyon-monastery

The monastery was originally developed in 1942 during WWII by Gerald Heard, a disciple of Swami Prabhavananda of the Vedanta Society of Southern California an American branch of the Ramakrishna Order of India. Established as Trabuco College, it was originally meant to be a religious, non-sectarian, co-ed monastery, unaffiliated with any particular religious organization. Aldous Huxley, a close friend of Heard, spent 6 weeks there working on his book The Perennial Philosophy.

Heard's attempt to make an unaffiliated monastery failed, and he donated the land and buildings to the Vedanta Society of Southern California for use as a monastery for men. It was consecrated on September 7, 1949, by Swami Prabhavananda, as the Ramakrishna Monastery. It is located on a 40-acre property in the rolling hills of Trabuco Canyon, California. It bears the name of the great Indian mystic, Sri Ramakrishna, founder of the Ramakrishna Order of India.
