= Swami Satprakashananda =

Indian philosopher, monk, and religious teacher

- Born: April 1888; Dhaka, Indian Empire
- Died: 15 November 1979
- Education: University of Calcutta
- Occupations: Monk, writer, and teacher

Swami Satprakashananda (April 1888 – 15 November 1979) was an Indian philosopher, monk of the Ramakrishna Order, and religious teacher.

== Biography ==
Swami Satprakashananda was born in Dhaka (now in Bangladesh) in April 1888 in what has been described as a "pious Hindu family". His premonastic name was Harish, and his father died when he was young. Harish joined the Ramakrishna Order in 1924 in Dhaka after postgraduate work at the University of Calcutta. He had been initiated by Swami Brahmananda in 1908, later receiving monastic orders (Sannyasa) from Swami Shivananda in 1927. Satprakashananda served for a time as an associate editor of Prabuddha Bharata, an English-language monthly journal of the Ramakrishna Order published since 1896, and for six years directed the Ramakrishna Mission Center in New Delhi.

In 1937, Satprakashananda was sent to the United States of America. He gave lectures for a summer in Washington, D.C., but decided not to start a center in that city "for two reasons: the central focus of the city is political, not spiritual, and its population is transient."

Satprakashananda subsequently went to Saint Louis, Missouri where in 1938 he established a permanent Vedanta Society which he directed for the next forty years.

Satprakashananda was a scholar and wrote a number of books on Vedanta and Indian religious scriptures and commentary. He taught Huston Smith, an influential writer and religious studies scholar. Smith stated that "Swami Satprakashananda first introduced me to Hindu psychology... [and] was perhaps the only person I know who was truly a saint".

In American Veda, Philip Goldberg reported that after moving into the area, Huston Smith sought out the Saint Louis Vedanta Society, "took up a meditation practice and probed deeply into Vedanta, meeting with Satprakashananda for tutorials virtually every week for ten straight years." When the St. Louis Vedanta Society grew and was ready to purchase its own building, Smith placed the deed in his own name, having served "as front man for the transaction," because "someone—the owner, the realtors, or the city—refused to sell to a dark-skinned heathen like Satprakashananda," an incident described by the American Vedantist as an occasion when Swami Satprakashananda "faced racial discrimination."

== Thought ==
Historian Carl Jackson noted the similarity of Satprakashananda's presentation of seven principles of Vedanta with a presentation almost fifty years earlier by the Vedanta Society of San Francisco, remarking that "there is a uniformity... that suggests that in nearly a century there has been almost no deviation from Swami Vivekananda's original formulations"

Goldberg reported that when Satprakashananda was asked whether Vedanta would take root in America, he replied "Yes, but the source will not be recognized" — a reply that Goldberg described as "prescient."

== Written works, selected ==
- Satprakashananda, Swami (2001). Vedanta for All. Chennai, India: Sri Ramakrishna Math. ISBN 9788171209347. OCLC 489436180. (compiled and edited by Ray Ellis; republished by Lulu Press, 2015, ISBN 9781329356078)
- Satprakashananda, Swami (1977). The goal and the way: the Vedantic approach to life's problems. Vedanta Society of St. Louis. ISBN 9780916356569. OCLC 3608069.
  - Reviewed in Philosophy East and West
- Satprakashananda, Swami (1965). Methods of Knowledge: Perceptual, Non-perceptual, and Transcendental. London: George Allen and Unwin. OCLC 912068500.
  - Reviewed in Philosophy East and West, The Middle Way
