= VSSC (disambiguation) =

Vikram Sarabhai Space Centre is a major space research centre of the Indian Space Research Organisation.

VSSC may also refer to:

- Voltage-sensitive sodium channels
- Vedanta Society of Southern California, a branch of the Ramakrishna Math
