= Spiritual Heritage of India (book) =

1962 book by Swami Prabhavananda

The Spiritual Heritage of India
- (cover of the 1979 edition)
- Author: Swami Prabhavananda
- Language: English
- Genre: Philosophy; Spirituality
- Publisher: Vedanta Press
- Publication date: 1962; 1979; others
- Pages: 374
- ISBN: 0-87481-035-3

The Spiritual Heritage of India is a book written by Swami Prabhavananda (1893–1976), founder and head of the Vedanta Society of Southern California from 1930 until his death. Originally published in 1962 by Doubleday, the book has been republished with the same title in several later editions, including hardcover, paperback, and sound recording. It has been reviewed in magazines and professional journals. A foreword by Huston Smith was first included in a 1979 edition.

== Overview ==
Following an eight-page introduction, The Spiritual Heritage of India is divided into five major sections or "books":

I. The Vedas and the Upanishads. This contains chapters on general aspects of the Vedas; On the Samhitas, Brahmanas, and Aranyakas; and a lengthy chapter on the Upanishads.

II. The Auxiliary Scriptures. Chapters on the conceptual status of the auxiliary scriptures, including summaries of Ramayana, Mahabharata, and Yoga Vasistha; on the Bhagavad Gita; and on the Smritis, Puranas, and Tantras.

III. Jainism and Buddhism. A chapter on each of these traditions.

IV. The Six Systems of Thought. Chapters include general remarks on the six orthodox (astika) schools of Hindu philosophy; Nyaya and Vaisheshika; Samkhya; Yoga system of Patanjali; Purva Mimamsa; and the Brahma Sutras (also known as the Vedanta Sutras)

V. Vedanta and Its Great Exponents. Chapters are included on Gaudapada; Shankara; Bhaskara; Yamuna; Ramanuja; Nimbarka; Madhwa; Vallabha; Sri Caitanya; and Sri Ramakrishna.

The book concludes with a bibliography and index. In the foreword, Smith wrote that one of the book's

many virtues is the way it integrates the variety in the Indian heritage which, left to itself, can be bewildering. Even Buddhism and Jainism, technically considered by Hindus to be unorthodox, are here shown to be authentic expressions of the basic Indian vision. Or the Six Systems of Indian Philosophy; often regarded as competitors, they are here shown to complement one another.... Indian thought as it emerges in the reading of this book is... pre-disciplinary in the rich and holistic way that Biblical, Chinese and early Greek thought are. (p. 9)

== Influence ==
=== Reviews ===
A reviewer in the magazine Books Abroad (later renamed as World Literature Today) stated that "The Spiritual Heritage of India offers a clear Indian view of a subject that currently suffers from too much Western commentary," and that "Prabhavananda treats India's spiritual heritage in terms of 'immediate perception,' as opposed to abstract speculation.... his own translations, though limited in this volume, embody unusual poetic power".

Christian Century wrote that "As India seeks to define herself as a secular state it becomes ever more important for us to be informed about the kinds of theisms and nontheisms that go into her religious philosophy. [Prabhavananda's book] is a comprehensive survey; little previous familiarity is necessary on the reader's part." Publishers Weekly, stated that in this book "Swami Prabhavananda, [who is] a recognized authority on the subject of Indian religion and philosophy [and] whose books are used as texts at Indian universities, explains in detail the various schools of religious thought that have developed in India."

A reviewer in the academic journal Philosophy stated that "Swami Prabhavananda has written a charming and authoritative book on the spiritual heritage of India, by which he means that heritage in consonance with the Vedic tradition and its culmination in Vedanta." The reviewer stated that "throughout the book breathes an air of relaxed simplicity and conviction.... I was particularly refreshed by the absence of attacks on science, materialism, naturalism, and other such means to spiritual fulfilment." A reviewer in the Hibbert Journal stated that "True to the spirit of Ramakrishna to whose Order of Monks he belongs, he is extremely catholic in his spiritual outlook, which makes his book imbued with wide sympathies and understanding. The non-specialist reader will find it a good and reliable introduction to the spiritual heritage of India. But it will be useful also to the more serious student of Indian philosophy and religion, since it covers almost the whole field of spiritual thought and practice in that ancient land".

=== Other ===
The Spiritual Heritage of India was discussed in Antony Copley's (2006) book about Prabhavananda's disciple Christopher Isherwood, a well-known literary figure. Copley noted that Prabhavananda wrote two overviews of Indian philosophy, Vedic Religion and Philosophy (1937) and The Spiritual Heritage of India (1962). According to Copley, in the later book, "more space is given to the heterodox while trying to incorporate them within the orthodox. He saw the teachings of the Tantras as compatible with those of the Upanishads. Here the role of the eternal feminine is introduced; the power of shakti, of God the mother, inseparable from the Absolute.... He also sets out more fully an account of the psychology of yoga. Intriguingly, he tries to demonstrate that Freud's two basic instincts, Eros and Thanatos, translated here as the will to live and the will to death - and quite clearly in America with its cult of psychoanalysis Prabhavananda could not continue to ignore Freud - can be incorporated into yoga psychology."

== Editions ==
The original edition was published by in London by Allen and Unwin in 1962. Editions include:

- London: George Allen & Unwin (1962), hardcover, OCLC 67572212, OCLC 460779291, OCLC 1907182 (374 pages)
- Garden City, NY: Doubleday (1963), hardcover, OCLC 269556, ASIN B001OMOO2I, ASIN B000NW9XI0
- Garden City, NY: Anchor (1964), paperback, OCLC 7496498, OCLC 80147018, ASIN B001RQXVTS (374 pages)
- Hollywood, CA: Vedanta Press (1969), paperback, ISBN 978-0-87481-022-6 (short ISBN 0-87481-022-1) (374 pages)
- Madras, India: Sri Ramakrishna Math (1977), paperback, OCLC 500503758, ISBN 978-81-7120-145-7 (short ISBN 81-7120-145-8) (374 pages)
- Hollywood, CA: Vedanta Press (1979), paperback, ISBN 978-0-87481-035-6 (book itself lists only 10-digit ISBN 0-87481-035-3) (374 pages)
- Enfield, NSW, Australia: Royal Blind Society Student and Special Transcriptions (1996), sound recording, OCLC 221972992
