= Ramakrishna Mission, Delhi =

Spiritual organisation established by Swami Vivekananda

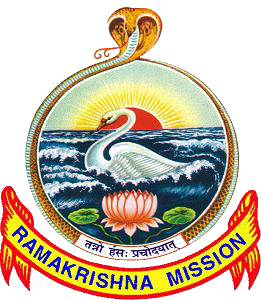
- Emblem
- Type: Religious organisation
- Headquarters: Belur Math, West Bengal, India
- Location: Delhi
- Coordinates: 11.144140°N 76.946197°E
- Affiliations: Neo-Vedanta
- Website: https://rkmdelhi.org/

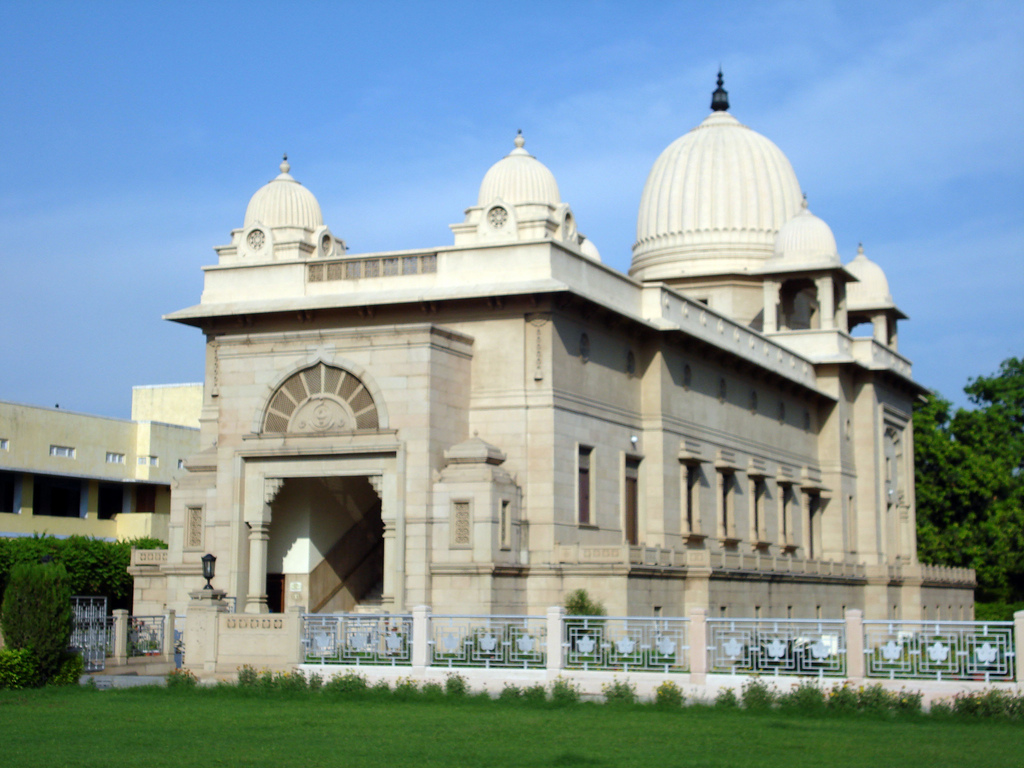
Ramakrishna Math, Delhi.

Ramakrishna Mission, Delhi is the Delhi branch of Ramakrishna Mission, a spiritual organisation established by Swami Vivekananda in 1897. The Delhi branch was established at Ramakrishna Ashram Marg on 4 May 1927.

== History ==
The Delhi mission has its origins in the Ramakrishna Math, which was opened in a rented house on 966, Garstin Baston Road in 1927. The construction work on the present premises started in 1934 after the first foundation brick was brought in from Belur Math to Delhi, and consecrated by Swami Shivananda, a direct disciple of Sri Ramakrishna and the second President of the Ramakrishna Math and the Ramakrishna Mission. Thereafter, the Delhi Centre was formally opened in 1935. Swami Ranganathananda, who later became the 13th president of the Ramakrishna Math and Mission and was awarded the Padma Vibhushan, served as the secretary at the Delhi Mission from 1949 to 1962. Swamis Sharvananda, Satprakashananda, Swahananda, Budhananda, Vandanananda and Gokulananda were also associated with the Delhi Mission.

In 2013, the Mission started working with CBSE to provide value-based education to students of classes VII, VIII and IX.

== Transport ==
The mission is accessible by the Ramakrishna Ashram Marg metro station of Delhi Metro.
