= Bhagavad Gita: The Song of God =

Translation of the Bhagavad Gītā Hindu scripture

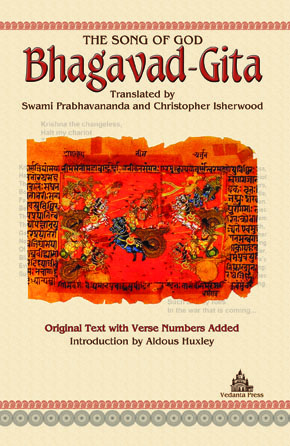
- Cover of the 2023 edition
- Author: Vyasa
- Original title: Bhagavad Gita
- Translator: Swami Prabhavananda and Christopher Isherwood
- Language: English
- Subject: Hindu scripture
- Publisher: The Marcel Rodd Co.
- Publication date: 1944
- Publication place: United States
- Pages: 187
- OCLC: 1361150392

Bhagavad Gita: The Song of God is the title of the Swami Prabhavananda and Christopher Isherwood's translation of the Bhagavad Gītā (Sanskrit: भगवद्गीता, "Song of God"), an important Hindu scripture. It was first published in 1944 with an Introduction by Aldous Huxley. This translation is unusual in that it is a collaboration between a world-renowned English language author and an adept in Vedanta Philosophy and Hindu scripture. With this translation, "...the very purpose of life in Hindu terms becomes luminously clear." The 2023 edition includes the standardized verse markings that were left out from the original, published in 1944.

Aldous Huxley wrote the introduction and gave advice during the translation process, "Forget that Krishna is speaking to the Hindus in Sanskrit. Forget that this is a translation. Think that Krishna is speaking to an American audience in English."

Despite the translation's merits, it has been criticized for not including the standard verse numbers, making it difficult to compare to other translations and some critics take issue with the translation of particular verses. However, "To preserve the everlasting simplicity of the Gita's words… Isherwood…and his teacher [Swami Prabhavananda] have collaborated on this latest translation… the result is a distinguished literary work… simpler and freer than other English translations… It may help U.S. readers to understand not only the Gita itself, but also its influence on American letters through one of its greatest U.S. admirers, Ralph Waldo Emerson."

The translation was well received in the U.S. and earned reviews in the New York Times, Time Magazine, and was adopted as a text book in many colleges and universities, for comparative religion studies. It sold over 1,000,000 copies since its first publication in 1944.

== Origin of translation ==
Swami Vivekananda, the founder of the Ramakrishna Order in India, brought Vedanta to the West beginning with his appearance at the 1893 Chicago Parliament of Religions and establishing the first Vedanta Societies in America. From his early days in the US, a priority was placed on translating the great scriptures of India into English. Vivekananda wrote:

No foreigner will ever write the English language as well as the native Englishman, and the ideas, when put in good English, will spread farther than in Hindu English.

Swami Prabhavananda, a monk of the Ramakrishna Order and founder and head of the Vedanta Society of Southern California, first came to the US in 1923, assigned to the Vedanta Society of San Francisco. In 1930, he founded the Vedanta Society of Southern California, and within the decade he had attracted many notable literary disciples, including English authors, Gerald Heard, Aldous Huxley, and Christopher Isherwood.

While the Swami was on vacation in Palm Springs, he was reading an English translation of the Gita and felt the meaning was lost. After consulting with his literary disciples, he decided to take on the effort to produce a new translation.

== Translators' preface ==
Prabhavananda and Isherwood explain how the Gita is actually just a small part of the epic poem, the Mahabharata (chapters 23–40 of book 6). It's also explained why the original is in all verse, but they decided to be more flexible with the writing, "...we have translated the Gita in a variety of styles, partly prose, partly verse. There is, of course, no justification for this experiment in the text itself. The transitions from one style to another are quite arbitrary. They can be judged from one standpoint only: have we made the book more readable?"

The translators also explains why they were more free with their translation, compared to others, "Extremely literal translations of the Gita already exist. We have aimed, rather, at an interpretation. Here is one of the greatest religious documents of the world: let us not approach it too pedantically as an archaic text which must be jealously preserved by university professors. It has something to say, urgently, to every one of us."

== Introduction by Aldous Huxley ==
In Huxley's introduction, he takes a sweeping view of the Perennial Philosophy and touches on the history of the concept that there is an underlying reality that all the traditional religions acknowledge - the Godhead, Clear Light of the Void, and Brahman. He also provides a version of his Minimum Working Hypothisis, instructions for how to seek the experience of the highest reality.

== Gita and Mahabharata ==
The translators give an in-depth description of the events leading up to the plot of the Gita. As the name suggest it is the story of the great (Maha) King Bharata. All of India is drawn into a war, which is used as a metaphor for the battle that we face inside ourselves; the battle of good vs. evil, right conduct vs. failing to act. The principal actors in the poem are Sri Krishna, an incarnation of God, and Arjuna, a "high-souled prince" who falters on the battlefield after seeing friends and family in the enemy's ranks, who Arjuna is called to kill. Arjuna drops his weapons and declares he will not fight.

The rest of the book has Krishna, Arjuna's friend and advisor, explaining duty, the meaning of life, and describes a life of right conduct, through the various Yogas (paths). In the end, Arjuna realizes it is his duty and purpose to fight in the righteous war, and wins.

== Chapters ==
There are a total of 18 chapters and 700 verses in Gita. These are:

| Chapter | Traditional Title | Title in Prabhavananda/Isherwood Translation | Total Verses |
|---|---|---|---|
| 1 | Arjuna Vishada Yoga | The Sorrow of Arjuna | 47 |
| 2 | Sankhya Yoga | The Yoga of Knowledge | 72 |
| 3 | Karma Yoga | Karma Yoga | 50 |
| 4 | Jnana-Karma-Sanyasa Yoga | Renunciation Through Knowledge | 42 |
| 5 | Karma-Sanyasa Yoga | The Yoga of Renunciation | 29 |
| 6 | Atma-Samyama Yoga | The Yoga of Meditation | 47 |
| 7 | Jnana-Vijnana Yoga | Knowledge and Experience | 30 |
| 8 | Aksara-ParaBrahma Yoga | The Way to Eternal Brahman | 28 |
| 9 | Raja-Vidya-Raja-Guhya Yoga | The Yoga of Mysticism | 34 |
| 10 | Vibhuti Yoga | Divine Glory | 42 |
| 11 | Viswarupa-Darsana Yoga | The Vision of God in His Universal Form | 55 |
| 12 | Bhakti Yoga | The Yoga of Devotion | 20 |
| 13 | Ksetra-Ksetrajna-Vibhaga Yoga | The field and Its Knower | 34 |
| 14 | Gunatraya-Vibhaga Yoga | The Three Gunas | 27 |
| 15 | Purushottama Yoga | Devotion to the Supreme Spirit | 20 |
| 16 | Daivasura-Sampad-Vibhaga Yoga | Divine and Demonic Tendencies | 24 |
| 17 | Shraddhatraya-Vibhaga Yoga | Three Kinds of Faith | 28 |
| 18 | Moksha-Sanyasa Yoga | The Yoga of Renunciation | 78 |
| | Total | = | 700 |

== Cosmology of the Gita ==
After the 18 Chapters of the Gita itself, there is an Appendix where the translators explain how the Gita fits into the overall philosophy of Hindu religious literature. They also give a summary of Vedic cosmology and descriptions of the various deities in Hindu culture.

Prabhavananda and Isherwood felt it was more important to incorporate the commentaries into the text itself, rather than have the story of the Gita interrupted by explanations. They also decided not to include the verse numbers.

== Gita and War ==
Christopher Isherwood was a pacifist and Conscientiousness Objector in WWII, having suffered his father's death in WWI and seeing no effort by the allies to avoid plunging head-long into the next war. In England he was a member of the Peace Pledge Union, and during the war while in the US, he did alternative service with the Quakers.

In this Appendix, Isherwood explains that the Gita is neither pro- nor anti- war. In certain circumstances, it would be quite alright to refuse to fight. In Arjuna's position, since it's a righteous war, and he's a warrior by birth and trade - he must fight.

In the purely physical sphere of action, Arjuna is, indeed, no longer a free agent. The act of war is upon him; it has evolved out of his previous actions. At any given moment in time, we are what we are; and we have to accept the consequences of being ourselves. Only through this acceptance can we begin to evolve further. We may select the battleground. We cannot avoid the battle.

== Preface to the 2023 edition ==
In the preface to the new edition, a more detailed description of the origin of the translation is given. It also explains why this translation does not have the traditional commentary, that is usually given after each verse. Two foundational Swamis of the Ramakrishna Order had this advice: Swami Brahmananda, Prabhavananda's guru, said, "Let your first reading of the Gita be without commentary." And Swami Saradananda says in his book The Essence of the Gita, "It is not necessary for you to study all those commentaries… It is enough to understand the meaning as it reveals itself to you spontaneously."

The 2023 edition also added standard verse number, "...sole purpose of this [2023] edition is to include those standardized chapter and verse markings to facilitate comparisons to other translations. Otherwise, this edition is faithful to the Prabhavananda-Isherwood Gita."

== Editions ==
- Bhagavad Gita: The Song of God. Hollywood: The Marcel Rodd Co. 1944. OCLC 1361150392.
- Hardback edition by Vedanta Press, 1945
- Mentor Religious Classics, Harper & Row, NY, 1951
- Published in England by Phoenix House Ltd.
- Vedanta Press, Hollywood, CA, 1945–2023
