= Dana Sawyer =

American writer

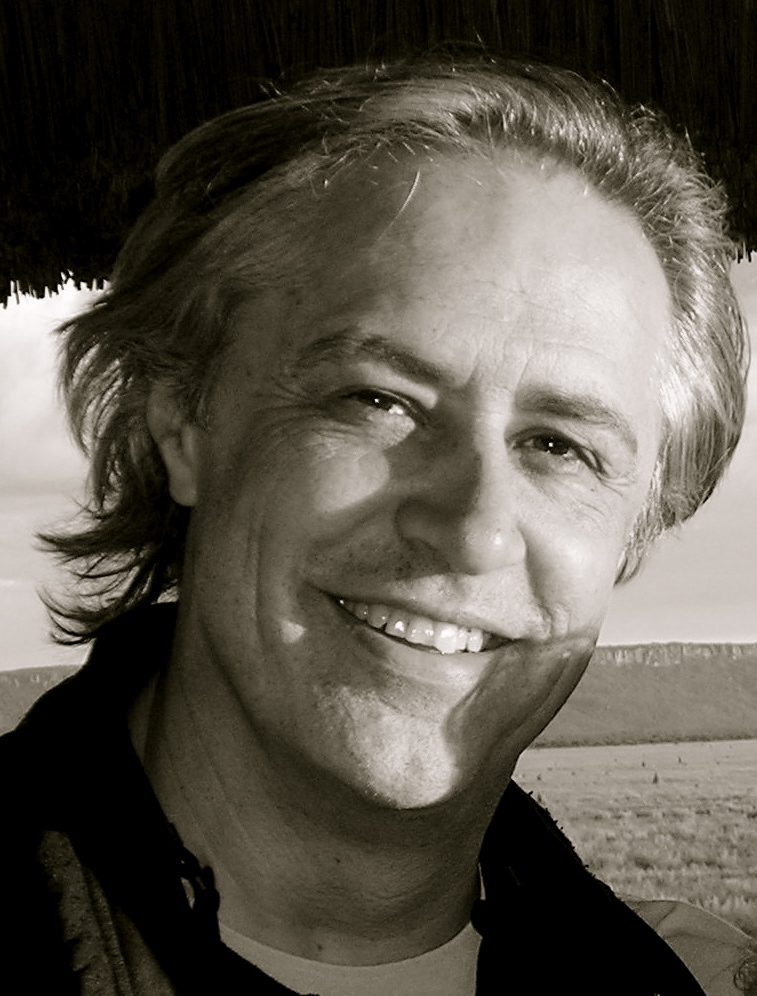
- Dana Sawyer
- Born: July 4, 1951; Jonesport, Maine, United States
- Occupation: Professor of Religion
- Known for: Author of Aldous Huxley: A Biography, author of the authorized biography Huston Smith: Wisdomkeeper: Living The World's Religions
- Spouse: Stephani Briggs
- Children: (from previous marriage) Sophie Sawyer and Emma Sawyer

Dana Sawyer is professor emeritus of religious studies and world religions at the Maine College of Art & Design and an adjunct professor in Asian Religions at the Chaplaincy Institute of Maine. He is the author of numerous published papers and books, including Aldous Huxley: A Biography, which Laura Huxley described as, "Out of all the biographies written about Aldous, this is the only one he would have actually liked."

He also wrote, Huston Smith, Wisdomkeeper, Sawyer's authorized biography of world religion scholar Huston Smith, which was published in 2014.

Huxley and Smith were close friends and were leading advocates of the perennial philosophy, which describes an underlying reality to material existence. Huxley's 1945 book, The Perennial Philosophy, argues that the concept is revealed in the mystical branches of all the world's religions. Sawyer's updated account of the perennial philosophy, The Perennial Philosophy Reloaded was published in July, 2024.

== Biography ==
Dana Sawyer was born in Jonesport, Maine in 1951 to Waide and Joanne Sawyer, and after the age of nine grew up with a younger sister, Cynthia, and brother, Paul, in the nearby village of Milbridge, where his father was a wholesale lobster buyer.

He has been involved in fund-raising activities for the Siddhartha School Project in Stok, Ladakh, north India, for more than ten years. This project has resulted in the construction of an elementary/ middle/high school for underprivileged Buddhist children that has been visited twice by the Dalai Lama, who holds it as a model for blending traditional and Western educational ideals. Much of his work for this project has involved translating at lectures for (and teaching with) the school's founder, Khen Rinpoche Lobzang Tsetan, who is the abbot of the Panchen Lama's monastery near Mysore, India.

Sawyer's interest in the phenomenon of Neo-Hindu and Buddhist groups in America led him to become a popular lecturer on topics of interest to these groups. He has taught at the Kripalu Center (Lenox, Massachusetts), the Barre Center for Buddhist Studies (Barre, Massachusetts), the Vedanta Society of Southern California (Hollywood, California), the Esalen Institute in Big Sur, California, and other such venues. This work has also brought him into contact with several important figures in this field, including Stanislav Grof, Andrew Harvey, Huston Smith, Laura Huxley, Stephen Cope, Jeffery Kripal, and Alex Grey.

Sawyer has been to India eighteen times, most recently while leading the study abroad program in India for the Maine College of Art & Design in 2019, and has traveled extensively throughout the subcontinent: Nepal, Pakistan, Sikkim, Thailand, Cambodia, Hong Kong, and Japan.

Related to academic work Sawyer has lectured at the Kyoto University of Foreign Studies, Banaras Hindu University, the University of Riga, Latvia, the Huntington Library, and at colleges and conferences throughout the United States (interview footage of Sawyer from the Riga conference was featured in a British documentary, "Brand New World," on the dangers of consumer culture). In August, 2005, Sawyer was a participant in the by-invitation-only conference on "Government, Education, and Religion" at the Oxford Roundtable, Lincoln College, Oxford University. He is a member of two academic societies: the Society for Asian and Comparative Philosophy (SACP) and the International Aldous Huxley Society, centered at the University of Munster in Germany.

== Selected publications ==
- The Transcendental Meditation Movement (Elements in New Religious Movements), Cambridge University Press 2023. Co-authored with C. Humes.
- Advaita Vedanta and Monistic Tantra: two sides of the same coin in Hindu tradition, TARKA: the Journal of Embodied Philosophy no.7, spring, 2023.
- What Is the ‘Unitive Mystical Experience’ Triggered by Psychedelic Medicines an Experience of? An Exploration of Aldous Huxley’s Viewpoint in Light of Current Data. MDPI 2022.
- Redressing a Straw Man: Correcting Critical Misunderstandings of Aldous Huxley’s Perennial Philosophy, Journal of Humanistic Psychology, 2021.
- Aldous Huxley and Self-Realization: His Concept of Human Potentialities, His Techniques for Actualizing Them, and His Views of Their Social Consequences, chief editor. The book includes Sawyer’s chapter: A Gratuitous Grace: An Up-to-date Assessment of Aldous Huxley’s Psychedelic Mysticism. Munster, Germany: LIT Verlag Publishing, 2020.
- Two Young Graduates Return to Ladakh, Looking to Give Back, Tricycle September, 2020 article about Siddhartha School in Ladakh, India in Tricycle.
- Religious Scholar Huston Smith has Died at 97, Obituary for Huston Smith, Tricycle, January 2017.
- Huston Smith: Wisdomkeeper: Living The World's Religions, the authorized biography (Fons Vitae, 2014).
- How Hinduism Seeped into American Soil, Article for Tricycle, Summer 2011.
- Downeast Roshi, a feature article on Zen Master Walter Nowick, Tricycle, the Buddhist Review (New York, Spring 2008)
- Edited, and wrote the preface, for Khen Rinpoche Lbzang Tsetan, Peaceful Mind, Compassionate Heart. Freeport, ME: Siddhartha School Project Press, 2008.
- Aldous Huxley as Environmental Prophet, in Aldous Huxley in America, a book of essays based on the Fourth International Symposium on Aldous Huxley, at Pasadena, California, August 2008. Muenster, Germany: the Centre for Aldous Huxley Studies, 2008.
- The Ersatz of Suchness, Aldous Huxley and the Spiritual Importance of Art in Essays on Aldous Huxley, a book based on the Third International Symposium on Aldous Huxley, at Riga, Latvia, Aug. 2004. Muenster, Germany: the Centre for Aldous Huxley Studies, 2007.
- Interview footage, discussing Huxley's theories regarding the dangers of consumer culture, appears in the British documentary film, Brand New World, by Ewan Jones-Morris and Andrzej Wojcik (London, 2004). This film won several awards and was featured at the British Museum in August 2007.
- Essays on Aldous Huxley and Brave New World for The Encyclopedia of Literature and Politics, M. Keith Booker, ed., London: Greenwood Press, 2005.
- Aldous Huxley, a Biography (New York: Crossroad Publishing, 2002).
- Aldous Huxley’s Truth Beyond Tradition, Tricycle: the Buddhist Review, New York, fall 2003.
- What kind of a mystic was Aldous Huxley Anyway? - A brief appraisal of his mysticism, in Aldous Huxley Annual (volume II, pp. 207–218), Bernfried Nugel, ed., published by the Centre for Aldous Huxley Studies, University of Munster, Munster, Germany, 2002.
- The Monastic Structure of Banarsi Dandi Sadhus, in Living Banaras: Hindu Religion in Cultural Context, Bradley Hertel and Cynthia Humes, eds. Wendy Doniger, chief editor of series (Buffalo, New York: State University of New York Press, 1993, and republished, Delhi: Manohar, 1998).
- Edited the Sanskrit and standardized the transliteration for Ananda Coomaraswamy's, Yakshas: Essays in the Water Cosmology (Delhi: Oxford University Press, 1994).

== Interviews with Dana Sawyer ==
- Spirit Matters - Talk on the perennial philosophy, February 2022
- Buddha at the Gas Pump - Dana Sawyer on Huston Smith, May 2016
- The Indie Spiritualist with Chris Grosso - Interview with Dana Sawyer

== Education ==
Ph.D. candidate, University of Iowa, School of Religion, Iowa City, Iowa (comprehensive examinations, May 1988). Major: History of Asian Religions with a primary focus on religion in modern India. Dissertation unfinished, though much of it has been published.

M.A., University of Iowa, School of Religion, History of Asian Religions, 1993.

Oxford University, Oxford, England. Accepted by the Oriental faculty to study for the Department of Philosophy, with Richard Gombrich as advisor. Attended during the Michelmas term, 1980.

University of Toronto, Toronto, Ontario. Graduate courses in Sanskrit and Indian Philosophy (with Bimal Motilal), Fall 1978.

M.A., University of Hawaiʻi, Department of Asian Studies, Honolulu, Hawaii, 1978. Major: The Religions of India.

B.A., Western Connecticut State University, Danbury, Connecticut 1973. Major: World Literature. Minor: philosophy.
