= Aldous Huxley =

English writer and philosopher (1894–1963)

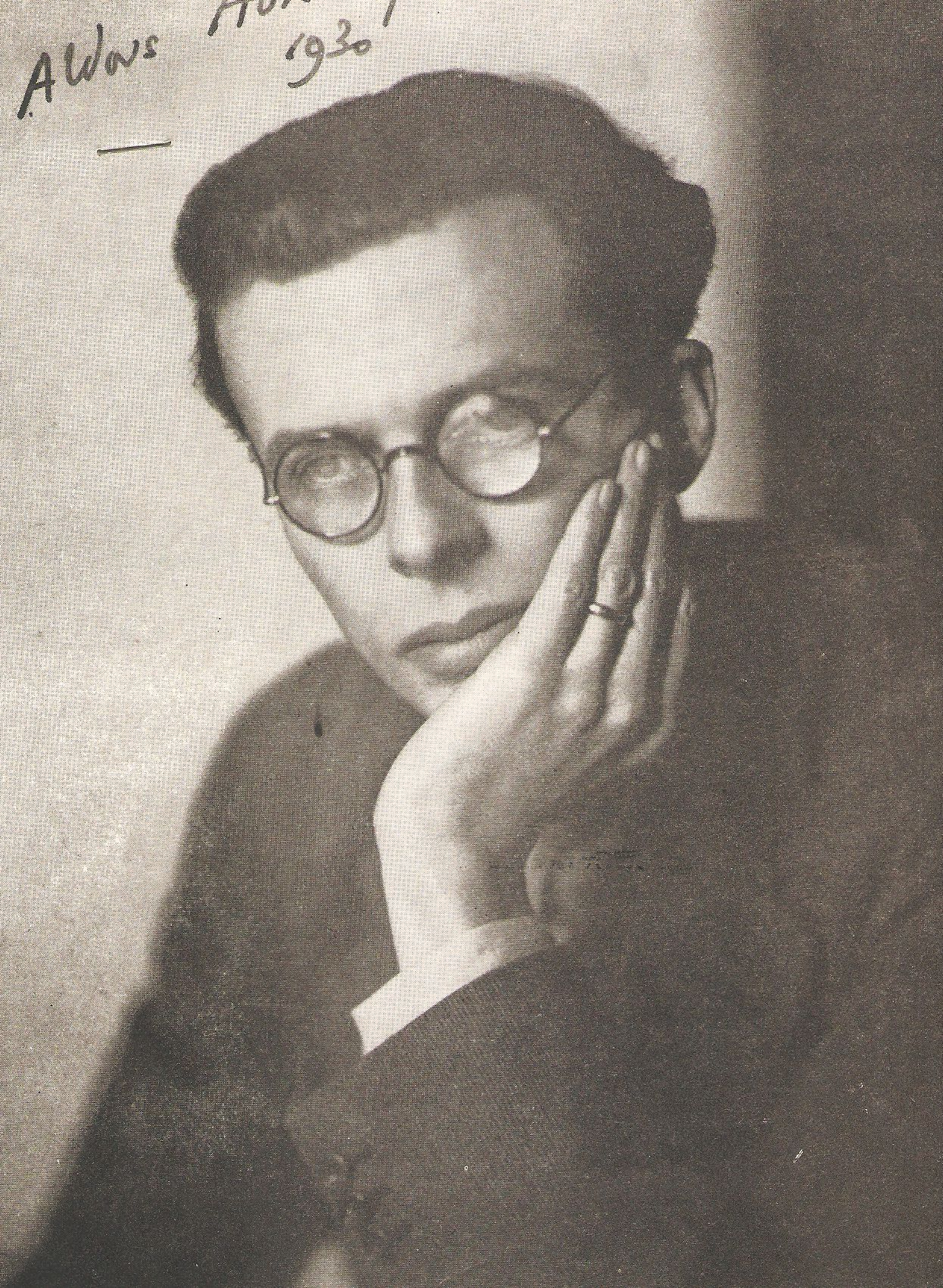
- Huxley in 1930
- Born: Aldous Leonard Huxley; 26 July 1894; Godalming, Surrey, England
- Died: 22 November 1963 (aged 69); Los Angeles County, California, U.S.
- Resting place: Compton, Guildford, Surrey
- Education: University of Oxford (BA)
- Occupations: Writer; philosopher
- Spouses: Maria Nys (m. 1919; died 1955); Laura Archera (m. 1956)
- Children: Matthew Huxley
- Relatives: Thomas Henry Huxley (grandfather); Leonard Huxley (father); Julia Arnold (mother); Andrew Huxley (half-brother); Julian Huxley (brother); Peter Eckersley (cousin)
- Writing career
- Notable works: Brave New World; Island; Point Counter Point; The Doors of Perception; The Perennial Philosophy; The Devils of Loudun

Aldous Leonard Huxley (/ˈɔːldəs/ AWL-dəs; 26 July 1894 – 22 November 1963) was an English writer and philosopher. His bibliography spans nearly 50 books, including non-fiction works, as well as essays, narratives and poems.

Born into the prominent Huxley family, he graduated from Balliol College, Oxford, with a degree in English literature. Early in his career, he published short stories and poetry and edited the literary magazine Oxford Poetry, before going on to publish novels (witty social-satirical novels and grimly serious ones), travel writing, and screenplays. He spent the latter part of his life in the United States, living in Los Angeles from 1937 until his death. By the end of his life, Huxley was widely acknowledged as one of the foremost intellectuals of his time. He was nominated for the Nobel Prize in Literature nine times, and was elected Companion of Literature by the Royal Society of Literature in 1962.

Huxley was a pacifist. He grew interested in philosophical mysticism, as well as universalism, addressing these subjects in his works such as The Perennial Philosophy (1945), which illustrates commonalities between Western and Eastern mysticism, and The Doors of Perception (1954), which interprets his own psychedelic experience with mescaline. In his most famous novel, Brave New World (1932), and his final novel, Island (1962), he presented his visions of dystopia and utopia, respectively.

== Early life ==
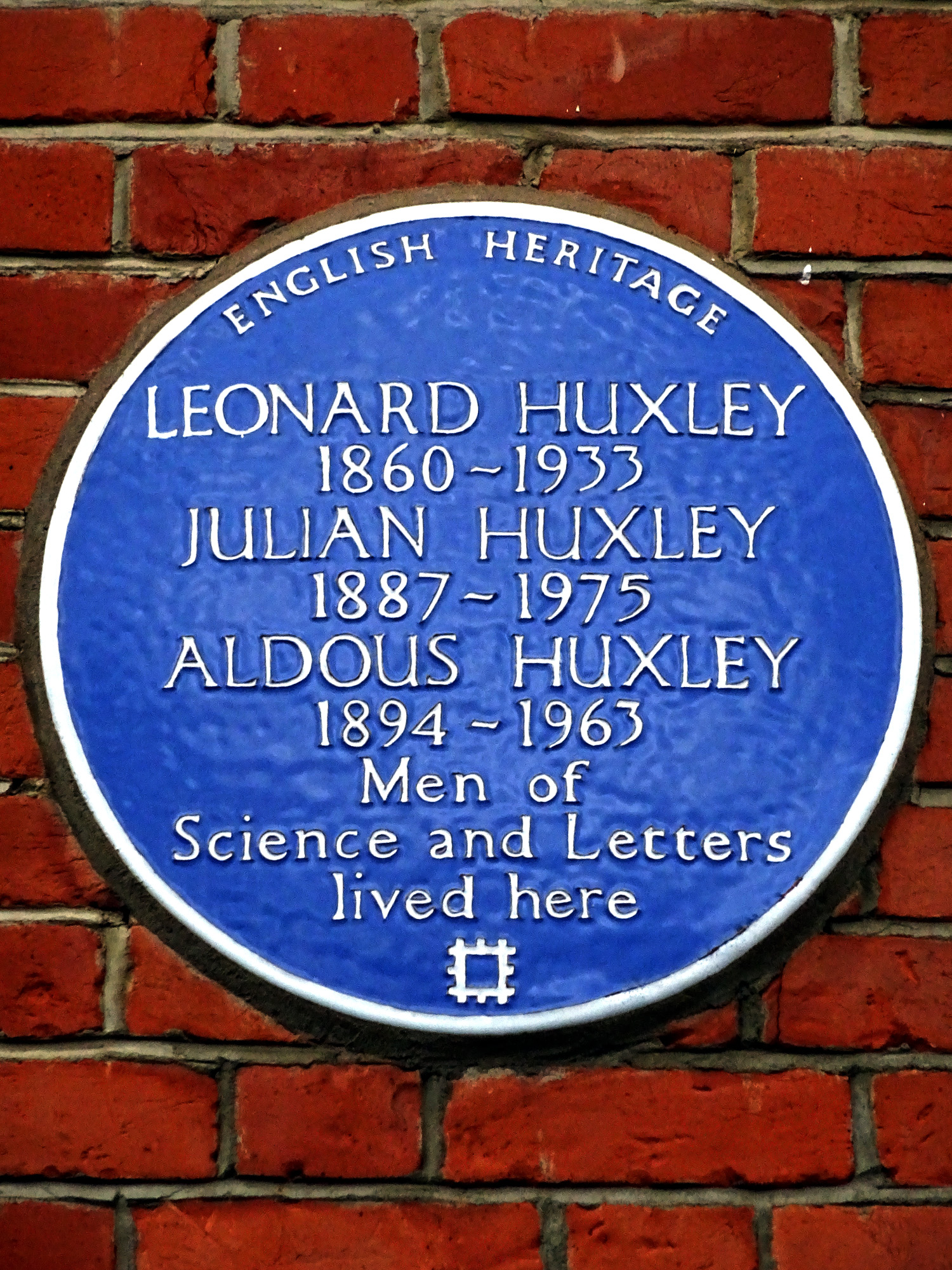
English Heritage blue plaque at 16 Bracknell Gardens, Hampstead, London, commemorating Aldous, his brother Julian, and his father Leonard

Huxley was born in Godalming, Surrey, England, on 26 July 1894. He was the third son of the writer and schoolmaster Leonard Huxley, who edited The Cornhill Magazine, and his first wife, Julia Arnold, who founded Prior's Field School. Julia was the niece of the poet and critic Matthew Arnold and the sister of the novelist Mrs Humphry Ward. Julia named him Aldous after a character in one of her sister's novels. Aldous was the grandson of Thomas Henry Huxley, the zoologist, agnostic and controversialist who had often been called "Darwin's Bulldog". His brother Julian Huxley and half-brother Andrew Huxley also became outstanding biologists. Aldous had another brother, Noel Trevenen Huxley (1889–1914), who took his own life after a period of clinical depression.

As a child, Huxley's nickname was "Ogie", diminutive for "Ogre". He was described by his brother Julian as someone who frequently contemplated "the strangeness of things". According to his cousin and contemporary Gervas Huxley, he had an early interest in drawing.

Huxley's education began in his father's well-equipped botanical laboratory, after which he enrolled at Hillside School near Godalming. He was taught there by his own mother for several years until she became terminally ill. After Hillside he went on to Eton College. His mother died in 1908, when he was 14 (his father later remarried). He contracted the eye disease keratitis punctata in 1911; this "left [him] practically blind for two to three years" and "ended his early dreams of becoming a doctor". In October 1913, Huxley entered Balliol College, Oxford, where he studied English literature. He volunteered for the British Army in January 1916 amidst the First World War; however, he was rejected on health grounds, being half-blind in one eye. His eyesight later partly recovered. He edited Oxford Poetry in 1916, and in June of that year graduated BA with first class honours. His brother Julian wrote:

I believe his blindness was a blessing in disguise. For one thing, it put paid to his idea of taking up medicine as a career ... His uniqueness lay in his universalism. He was able to take all knowledge for his province.

Following his years at Balliol, Huxley, being financially indebted to his father, decided to find employment. He taught French for a year at Eton College, where Eric Blair (who was to take the pen name George Orwell) and Steven Runciman were among his pupils. He was mainly remembered as being an incompetent schoolmaster unable to keep order in class. Nevertheless, Blair and others spoke highly of his excellent command of language.

Huxley also worked for a time during the 1920s at Brunner and Mond, an advanced chemical plant in Billingham in County Durham, northeast England. According to an introduction to his science fiction novel Brave New World (1932), the experience he had there of "an ordered universe in a world of planless incoherence" was an important source for the novel.

== Career ==
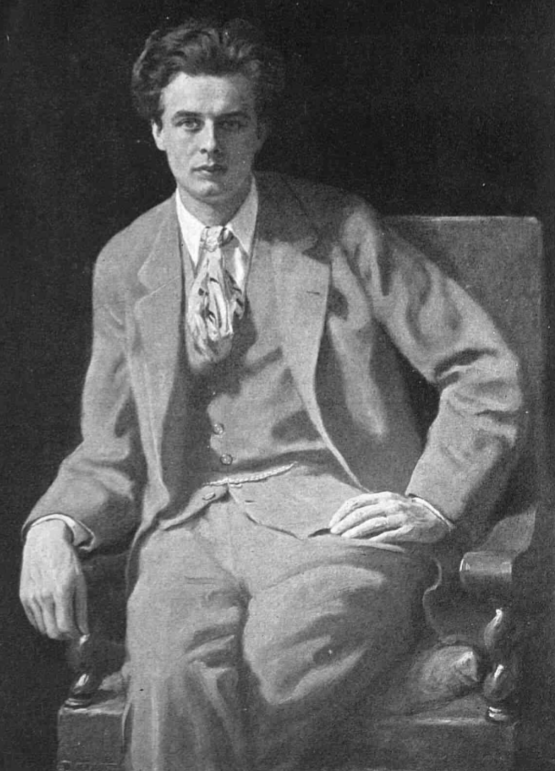
Painting of Huxley (at age 32) by John Collier (1927)

Huxley completed his first (unpublished) novel at the age of 17 and began writing seriously in his early twenties, establishing himself as a successful writer and social satirist. His first published novels were social satires, Crome Yellow (1921), Antic Hay (1923), Those Barren Leaves (1925) and Point Counter Point (1928). Brave New World (1932) was his fifth novel and first dystopian work. In the 1920s, he was also a contributor to Vanity Fair and British Vogue magazines.

=== Contact with the Bloomsbury Group ===
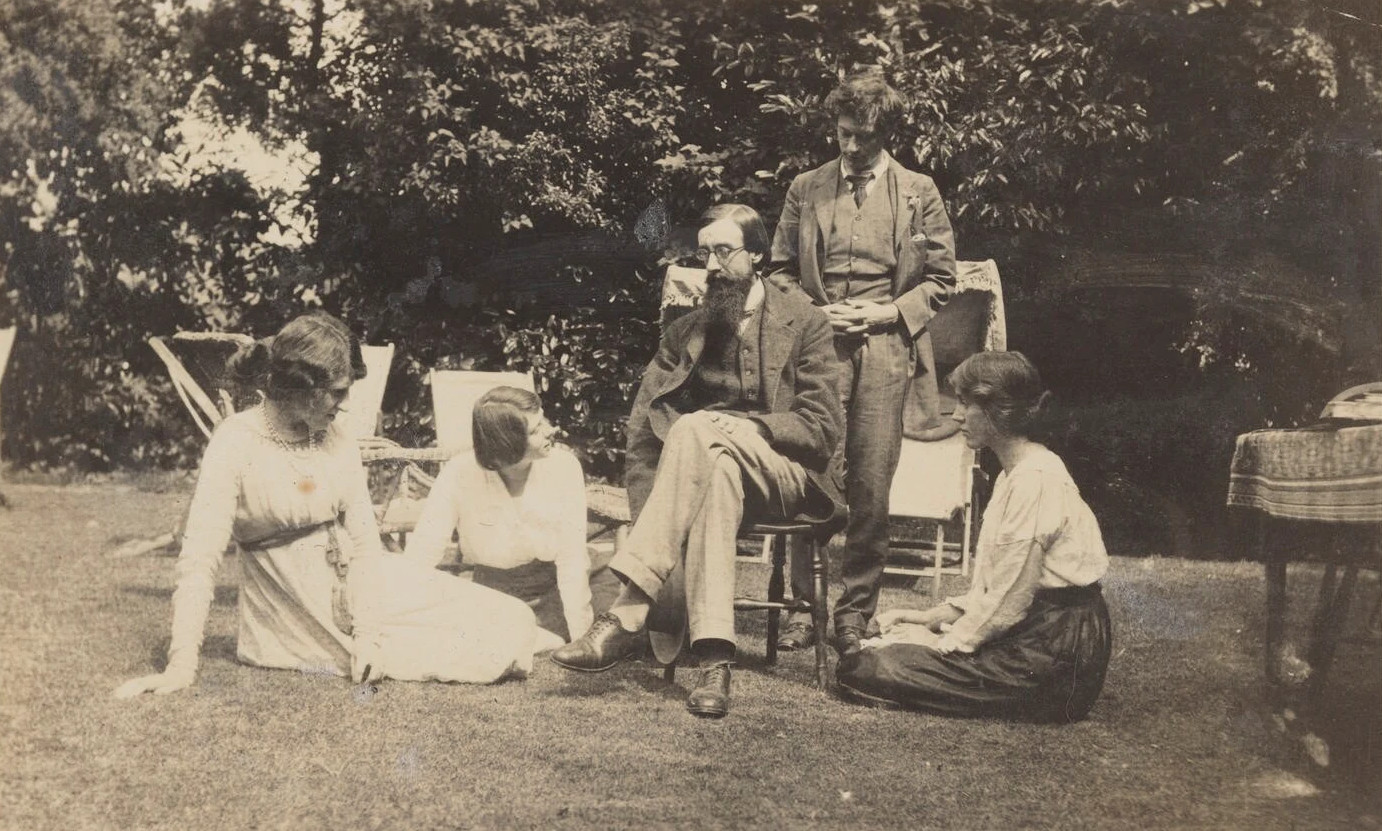
Bloomsbury Group members (July 1915). Left to right: Lady Ottoline Morrell (age 42); Maria Nys (age 15), who would become Mrs Huxley; Lytton Strachey (age 35); Duncan Grant (age 30); and Vanessa Bell (age 36)

During the First World War Huxley spent much of his time at Garsington Manor near Oxford, home of Lady Ottoline Morrell, working as a farm labourer. While at the Manor, he met several Bloomsbury Group figures, including Bertrand Russell, Alfred North Whitehead and Clive Bell. Later, in Crome Yellow (1921), he caricatured the Garsington lifestyle. Jobs were very scarce, but in 1919 John Middleton Murry was reorganising the Athenaeum and invited Huxley to join the staff. He accepted immediately, and quickly married the Belgian refugee Maria Nys (1899–1955), also at Garsington. They lived with their young son in Italy part of the time during the 1920s, where Huxley would visit his friend D. H. Lawrence. Following Lawrence's death in 1930 (he and Maria were present at his death in Provence), Huxley edited Lawrence's letters (1932). Very early in 1929, in London, Huxley met Gerald Heard, a writer and broadcaster, philosopher and interpreter of contemporary science. Heard was nearly five years older than Huxley, and introduced him to a variety of profound ideas, subtle interconnections, and various emerging spiritual and psychotherapy methods.

Works of this period included novels about the dehumanising aspects of scientific progress, (his magnum opus Brave New World), and on pacifist themes (Eyeless in Gaza). In Brave New World, set in a dystopian London, Huxley portrays a society operating on the principles of mass production and Pavlovian conditioning. Huxley was strongly influenced by F. Matthias Alexander, on whom he based a character in Eyeless in Gaza.

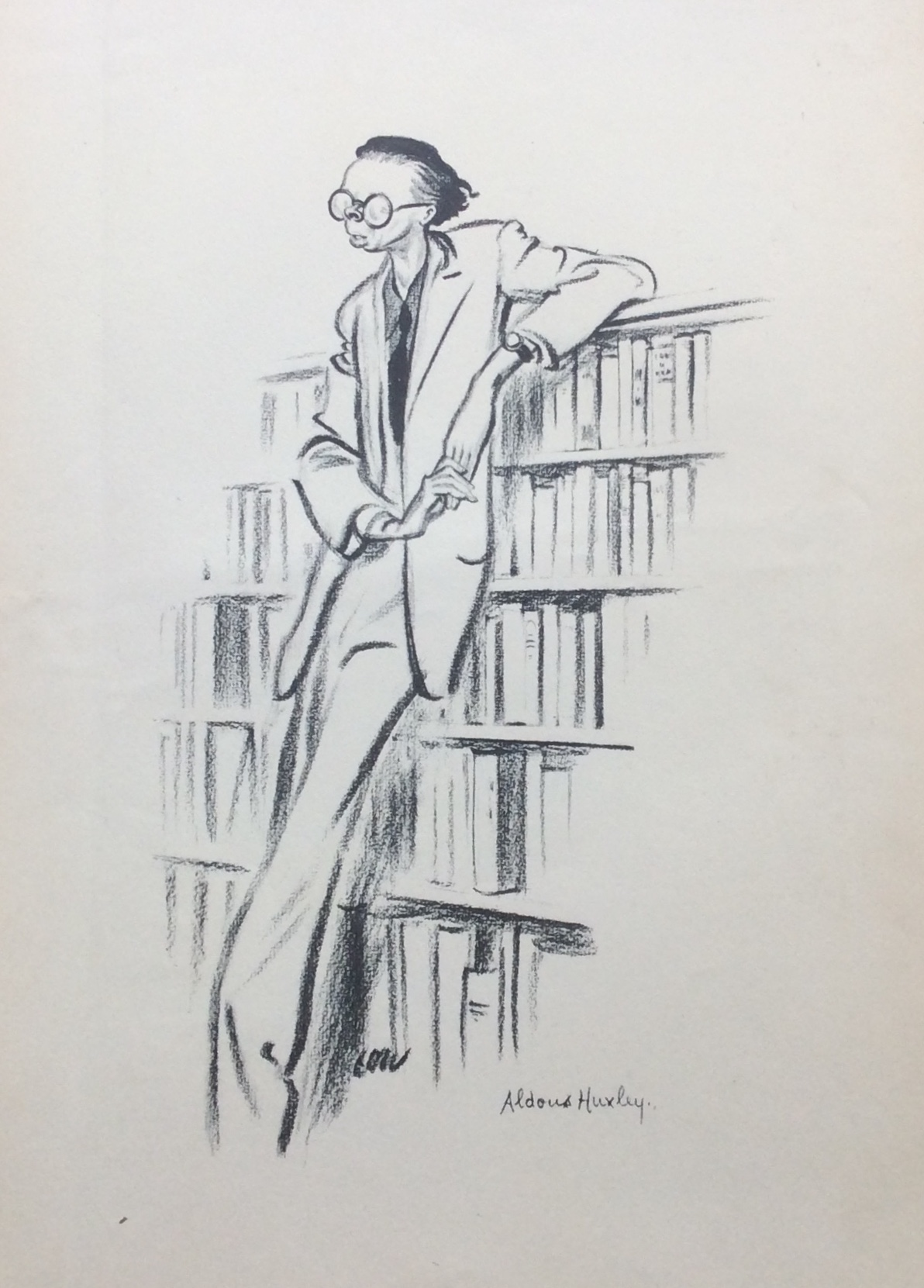
Aldous Huxley by Low (1933)

During this period, Huxley began to write and edit non-fiction works on pacifist issues, including Ends and Means (1937), An Encyclopedia of Pacifism and Pacifism and Philosophy, and was an active member of the Peace Pledge Union (PPU).

=== Life in the United States ===
In 1937 Huxley moved to Hollywood, Los Angeles, United States, with his wife Maria, son Matthew Huxley, and friend Gerald Heard. Cyril Connolly wrote, of the two intellectuals (Huxley and Heard) in the late 1930s, "all European avenues had been exhausted in the search for a way forward – politics, art, science – pitching them both toward the US in 1937." Huxley lived in the U.S., mainly southern California, until his death, and for a time in Taos, New Mexico, where he wrote Ends and Means (1937). The book contains tracts on war, inequality, religion and ethics.

Heard introduced Huxley to Vedanta (Upanishad-centered philosophy), meditation and vegetarianism through the principle of ahimsa. In 1938 Huxley befriended Jiddu Krishnamurti, whose teachings he greatly admired. Huxley and Krishnamurti entered into an enduring exchange (sometimes edging on debate) over many years, with Krishnamurti representing the more rarefied, detached, ivory-tower perspective and Huxley, with his pragmatic concerns, the more socially and historically informed position. Huxley wrote a foreword to Krishnamurti's quintessential statement, The First and Last Freedom (1954).

Huxley and Heard became Vedantists in the group formed around Hindu Swami Prabhavananda, and subsequently introduced Christopher Isherwood to the circle. Not long afterwards, Huxley wrote his book on widely held spiritual values and ideas, The Perennial Philosophy, which discussed the teachings of renowned mystics of the world.

Huxley became a close friend of Remsen Bird, president of Occidental College. He spent much time at the college in the Eagle Rock neighbourhood of Los Angeles. The college appears as "Tarzana College" in his satirical novel After Many a Summer (1939). The novel won Huxley a British literary award, the 1939 James Tait Black Memorial Prize for fiction. Huxley also incorporated Bird into the novel.

During this period Huxley earned a substantial income as a Hollywood screenwriter; Christopher Isherwood, in his autobiography My Guru and His Disciple, states that Huxley earned more than US$3,000 per week (approximately $50,000 in 2020 dollars) as a screenwriter, and that he used much of it to transport Jewish and left-wing writer and artist refugees from Hitler's Germany to the US. In March 1938 Huxley's friend Anita Loos, a novelist and screenwriter, put him in touch with Metro-Goldwyn-Mayer (MGM), which hired him for Madame Curie which was originally to star Greta Garbo and be directed by George Cukor. (Eventually, the film was completed by MGM in 1943 with a different director and cast.) Huxley received screen credit for Pride and Prejudice (1940) and was paid for his work on a number of other films, including Jane Eyre (1944). He was commissioned by Walt Disney in 1945 to write a script based on Alice's Adventures in Wonderland and the biography of the story's author, Lewis Carroll. The script was not used, however.

Huxley wrote an introduction to the posthumous publication of J. D. Unwin's 1940 book Hopousia or The Sexual and Economic Foundations of a New Society.

On 21 October 1949 Huxley wrote to George Orwell, a former student of Huxley at Eton and author of Nineteen Eighty-Four, congratulating him on "how fine and how profoundly important the book is". In his letter he predicted:

"Within the next generation I believe that the world's leaders will discover that infant conditioning and narcohypnosis are more efficient, as instruments of government, than clubs and prisons, and that the lust for power can be just as completely satisfied by suggesting people into loving their servitude as by flogging them and kicking them into obedience."

In 1953 Huxley and Maria applied for United States citizenship and presented themselves for examination. When Huxley refused to bear arms for the US and would not state that his objections were based on religious ideals, the only excuse allowed under the McCarran Act, the judge had to adjourn the proceedings. He withdrew his application. Nevertheless, he remained in the US. In 1959, Huxley turned down an offer to be made a Knight Bachelor by the Macmillan government without giving a reason; his brother Julian had been knighted in 1958, while his brother Andrew would be knighted in 1974.

In the autumn semester of 1960 Huxley was invited by Professor Huston Smith to be the Carnegie Visiting professor of humanities at the Massachusetts Institute of Technology (MIT). As part of the MIT centennial program of events organised by the Department of Humanities, Huxley presented a series of lectures titled, "What a Piece of Work is a Man" which concerned history, language, and art.

Robert S. de Ropp (scientist, humanitarian, and author), who had spent time with Huxley in England in the 1930s, connected with him again in the US in the early 1960s and wrote that "the enormous intellect, the beautifully modulated voice, the gentle objectivity, all were unchanged. He was one of the most highly civilized human beings I had ever met."

== Late-in-life perspectives ==
Biographer Harold H. Watts wrote that Huxley's writings in the "final and extended period of his life" are "the work of a man who is meditating on the central problems of many modern men". Huxley had deeply felt apprehensions about the future the developed world might make for itself. From these, he made some warnings in his writings and talks. In a 1958 televised interview conducted by journalist Mike Wallace, Huxley outlined several major concerns: the difficulties and dangers of world overpopulation; the tendency towards distinctly hierarchical social organisation; the crucial importance of evaluating the use of technology in mass societies susceptible to persuasion; the tendency to promote modern politicians to a naive public as well-marketed commodities. In a December 1962 letter to brother Julian, summarizing a paper he had presented in Santa Barbara, he wrote, "What I said was that if we didn't pretty quickly start thinking of human problems in ecological terms rather than in terms of power politics we should very soon be in a bad way."

Huxley's engagement with Eastern wisdom traditions was entirely compatible with a strong appreciation of modern science. Biographer Milton Birnbaum wrote that Huxley "ended by embracing both science and Eastern religion". In his last book, Literature and Science, Huxley wrote that "The ethical and philosophical implications of modern science are more Buddhist than Christian...." In "A Philosopher's Visionary Prediction", published one month before he died, Huxley endorsed training in general semantics and "the nonverbal world of culturally uncontaminated consciousness", writing that "We must learn how to be mentally silent, we must cultivate the art of pure receptivity.... [T]he individual must learn to decondition himself, must be able to cut holes in the fence of verbalized symbols that hems him in."

== Spiritual views ==
For much of his life Huxley described himself as agnostic, a word coined by his grandfather Thomas Henry Huxley, a scientist who championed the scientific method and was a major supporter of Darwin's theories. This is the definition he gave, "…it is wrong for a man to say that he is certain of the objective truth of any proposition unless he can produce evidence which logically justifies that certainty." Aldous Huxley's agnosticism, together with his speculative propensity, made it difficult for him to fully embrace any form of institutionalised religion. Over the last 30 years of his life, he accepted and wrote about concepts found in Vedanta and was a leading advocate of the Perennial Philosophy, which holds that the same metaphysical truths are found in all the major religions of the world.

In the 1920s Huxley was sceptical of religion. "Earlier in his career he had rejected mysticism, often poking fun at it in his novels..." according to his biographer Dana Sawyer. Gerald Heard became an influential friend of Huxley, and since the mid-1920s had been exploring Vedanta, as a way of understanding individual human life and the individual's relationship to the universe. Heard and Huxley both saw the political implications of Vedanta, which could help bring about peace, specifically that there is an underlying reality that all humans and the universe are a part of. In the 1930s, Huxley and Gerald Heard both became active in the effort to avoid another world war, writing essays and eventually publicly speaking in support of the Peace Pledge Union. But, they remained frustrated by the conflicting goals of the political left – some favouring pacifism (as did Huxley and Heard), while other wanting to take up arms against fascism in the Spanish Civil War.

After joining the PPU, Huxley expressed his frustration with politics in a letter from 1935, "…the thing finally resolves itself into a religious problem — an uncomfortable fact which one must be prepared to face and which I have come during the last year to find it easier to face." Huxley and Heard turned their attention to addressing the big problems of the world through transforming the individual, "[...] a forest is only as green as the individual trees of the forest is green [...]" This was the genesis of the Human Potential Movement, that gained traction in the 1960s.

In the late 1930s Huxley and Heard emigrated to the United States, and beginning in 1939 and continuing until his death in 1963, Huxley had an extensive association with the Vedanta Society of Southern California, founded and headed by Swami Prabhavananda. Together with Heard, Isherwood and other followers, he was initiated by the Swami and was taught meditation and spiritual practices. From 1941 until 1960, Huxley contributed 48 articles to Vedanta and the West, published by the society. He also served on the editorial board with Isherwood, Heard, and playwright John Van Druten from 1951 through 1962.

In 1942 The Gospel of Ramakrishna was published by the Ramakrishna-Vivekananda Center in New York. The book was translated by Swami Nikhilananda, with help from Joseph Campbell and Margaret Woodrow Wilson, a daughter of Woodrow Wilson, the 28th president of the United States. Huxley wrote in the foreword, "...a book unique, so far as my knowledge goes, in the literature of hagiography. Never have the small events of a contemplative's daily life been described with such a wealth of intimate detail. Never have the casual and unstudied utterances of a great religious teacher been set down with so minute a fidelity."

In 1944 Huxley wrote the introduction to the Bhagavad Gita – The Song of God, translated by Swami Prabhavananda and Christopher Isherwood, which was published by the Vedanta Society of Southern California. As an advocate of the perennial philosophy, Huxley was drawn to the Gita, as he explained in the Introduction, written during the Second World War, when it was still not clear who would win:

The Bhagavad Gita is perhaps the most systematic scriptural statement of the Perennial Philosophy. To a world at war, a world that, because it lacks the intellectual and spiritual prerequisites to peace, can only hope to patch up some kind of precarious armed truce, it stands pointing, clearly and unmistakably, to the only road of escape from the self–imposed necessity of self–destruction.

As a means of personally realizing the "divine Reality", he described a "Minimum Working Hypothesis" in the Introduction to Swami Prabhavananda's and Christopher Isherwood's translation of the Bhagavad Gita and in a free-standing essay in Vedanta and the West, a publication of Vedanta Press. This is the outline, that Huxley elaborates on in the article:

For those of us who are not congenitally the members of an organized church, who have found that humanism and nature-worship are not enough, who are not content to remain in the darkness of ignorance, the squalor of vice or the other squalor of respectability, the minimum working hypothesis would seem to run to about this:

That there is a Godhead, Ground, Brahman, Clear Light of the Void, which is the unmanifested principle of all manifestations.

That the Ground is at once transcendent and immanent.

That it is possible for human beings to love, know and, from virtually, to become actually identical with the divine Ground.

That to achieve this unitive knowledge of the Godhead is the final end and purpose of human existence.

That there is a Law or Dharma which must be obeyed, a Tao or Way which must be followed, if men are to achieve their final end.

For Huxley, one of the attractive features of Vedanta is that it provided a historic and established philosophy and practice that embraced the Perennial Philosophy; that there is a commonality of experiences across all the mystical branches of the world's religions. Huxley wrote in the introduction of his book The Perennial Philosophy:

The Perennial Philosophy is primarily concerned with the one, divine Reality substantial to the manifold world of things and lives and minds. But the nature of this one Reality is such that it cannot be directly and immediately apprehended except by those who have chosen to fulfill certain conditions, making themselves loving, pure in heart, and poor in spirit.

Huxley also occasionally lectured at the Hollywood and Santa Barbara Vedanta temples. Two of those lectures have been released on CD: Knowledge and Understanding and Who Are We? from 1955.

Many of Huxley's contemporaries and critics were disappointed by Huxley's turn to mysticism; Isherwood describes in his diary how he had to explain the criticism to Huxley's widow, Laura:

[December 11, 1963, a few weeks after Aldous Huxley's death] The publisher had suggested John Lehmann should write the biography. Laura [Huxley] asked me what I thought of the idea, so I had to tell her that John disbelieves in, and is aggressive toward, the metaphysical beliefs that Aldous held. All he would describe would be a clever young intellectual who later was corrupted by Hollywood and went astray after spooks.

== Psychedelic drug use and mystical experiences ==
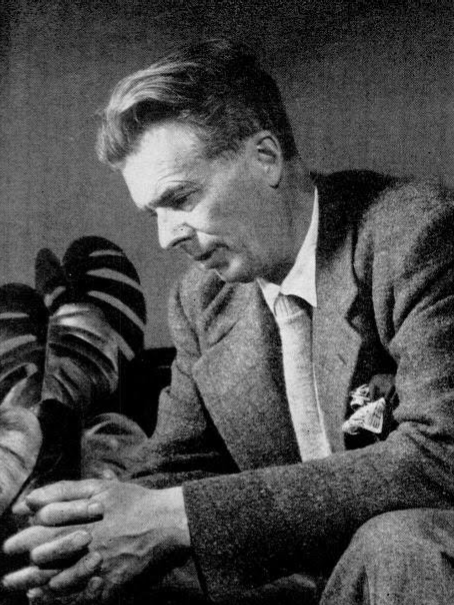
Aldous Huxley in 1954

In early 1953 Huxley had his first experience with the psychedelic drug mescaline. Huxley had initiated a correspondence with Humphry Osmond, a British psychiatrist then employed in a Canadian institution, and eventually asked him to supply a dose of mescaline; Osmond obliged and supervised Huxley's session in southern California. After the publication of The Doors of Perception, in which he recounted this experience, Huxley and Swami Prabhavananda disagreed about the meaning and importance of the psychedelic drug experience, which may have caused the relationship to cool, but Huxley continued to write articles for the society's journal, lecture at the temple, and attend social functions. Huxley later had an experience on mescaline that he considered more profound than those detailed in The Doors of Perception.

Huxley wrote that "The mystical experience is doubly valuable; it is valuable because it gives the experiencer a better understanding of himself and the world and because it may help him to lead a less self-centered and more creative life."

Having tried LSD under the supervision of Oscar Janiger in the 1950s, he became an advisor to Timothy Leary and Richard Alpert in their early-1960s research work with psychedelic drugs at Harvard University. Personality differences led Huxley to distance himself from Leary, when Huxley grew concerned that Leary had become too keen on indiscriminately promoting the drugs.

== Eyesight ==
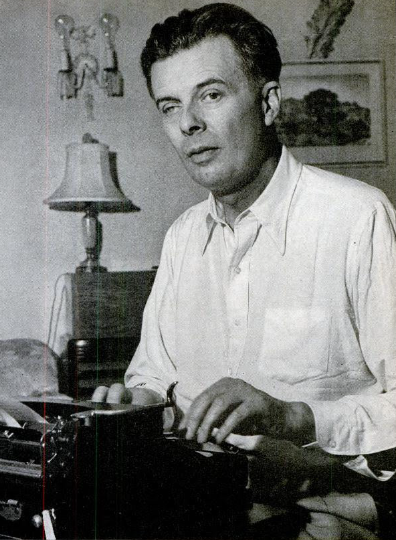
Huxley (age 52) in 1947, his right eye affected by keratitis, which he had contracted in 1911

Differing accounts exist about the details of the quality of Huxley's eyesight at specific points in his life. Circa 1939 Huxley encountered the Bates method, in which he was instructed by Margaret Darst Corbett. In 1940 Huxley relocated from Hollywood to a 40-acre (16 ha) ranchito in the high desert hamlet of Llano, California, in northern Los Angeles County. Huxley then said that his sight improved dramatically with the Bates method and the extreme and pure natural lighting of the southwestern American desert. He reported that, for the first time in more than 25 years, he was able to read without glasses and without strain. He even tried driving a car along the dirt road beside the ranch. He wrote a book about his experiences with the Bates method, The Art of Seeing, which was published in the US in 1942 and in Britain in 1943. The book contained some generally disputed theories, and after its publication there was a growing popular controversy about Huxley's eyesight.

It was, and is, widely believed that Huxley was nearly blind since the illness in his teens, despite the partial recovery that had enabled him to study at Oxford. For example, some ten years after publication of The Art of Seeing, in 1952, Bennett Cerf was present when Huxley spoke at a Hollywood banquet, wearing no glasses and apparently reading his paper from the lectern without difficulty:

Then suddenly he faltered—and the disturbing truth became obvious. He wasn't reading his address at all. He had learned it by heart. To refresh his memory he brought the paper closer and closer to his eyes. When it was only an inch or so away he still couldn't read it, and had to fish for a magnifying glass in his pocket to make the typing visible to him. It was an agonising moment.

The Brazilian author João Ubaldo Ribeiro, who as a young journalist spent several evenings in the Huxleys' company in the late 1950s, wrote that Huxley had said to him, with a wry smile: "I can hardly see at all. And I don't give a damn, really."

On the other hand, Huxley's second wife Laura later emphasised in her biographical account, This Timeless Moment: "One of the great achievements of his life: that of having regained his sight." After revealing a letter she wrote to the Los Angeles Times disclaiming the label of Huxley as a "poor fellow who can hardly see" by Walter C. Alvarez, she tempered her statement:

Although I feel it was an injustice to treat Aldous as though he were blind, it is true there were many indications of his impaired vision. For instance, although Aldous did not wear glasses, he would quite often use a magnifying lens.

Laura Huxley proceeded to elaborate a few nuances of inconsistency peculiar to Huxley's vision. Her account, in this respect, agrees with the following sample of Huxley's own words from The Art of Seeing:

The most characteristic fact about the functioning of the total organism, or any part of the organism, is that it is not constant, but highly variable.

Nevertheless, the topic of Huxley's eyesight has continued to endure similar, significant controversy. The American popular science author Steven Johnson, in his book Mind Wide Open, quotes Huxley about his difficulties with visual encoding:

I am and, for as long as I can remember, I have always been a poor visualizer. Words, even the pregnant words of poets, do not evoke pictures in my mind. No hypnagogic visions greet me on the verge of sleep. When I recall something, the memory does not present itself to me as a vividly seen event or object. By an effort of the will, I can evoke a not very vivid image of what happened yesterday afternoon ...

== Personal life ==
Huxley was married on 10 July 1919 to Maria Nys (10 September 1899 – 12 February 1955), a Belgian refugee from Bellem, a village near Aalter, whom he met at Garsington, Oxfordshire, in 1919. They had one child, Matthew Huxley (19 April 1920 – 10 February 2005), who had a career as an author, anthropologist and a prominent epidemiologist. Maria died of cancer in 1955.

In 1956 Huxley married Laura Archera (1911–2007), also an author, as well as a violinist and psychotherapist. She wrote This Timeless Moment, a biography of Huxley. She told the story of their marriage through Mary Ann Braubach's 2010 documentary, Huxley on Huxley.

Huxley was diagnosed with laryngeal cancer in 1960; in the years that followed, with his health deteriorating, he wrote the utopian novel Island, and gave lectures on "Human Potentialities" both at the UCSF Medical Center and at the Esalen Institute. These lectures were fundamental to the beginning of the Human Potential Movement.

Huxley was a close friend of Jiddu Krishnamurti and Rosalind Rajagopal, and was one of the original trustees of the Happy Valley School (now Besant Hill School) of Happy Valley, in Ojai, California.

The most substantial collection of Huxley's few remaining papers, following the destruction of most in the 1961 Bel Air Fire, is at the Library of the University of California, Los Angeles. Some are also at the Stanford University Libraries.

On 9 April 1962 Huxley was informed he had been elected Companion of Literature by the Royal Society of Literature, the senior literary organisation in Britain, and he accepted the title via letter on 28 April 1962. The correspondence between Huxley and the society is kept at the Cambridge University Library. The society invited Huxley to appear at a banquet and give a lecture at Somerset House, London, in June 1963. Huxley wrote a draft of the speech he intended to give at the society; however, his deteriorating health meant he was not able to attend.

== Death ==
In 1960 Huxley was diagnosed with oral cancer, and for the next three years his health steadily declined. On 4 November 1963, less than three weeks before Huxley's death, the author Christopher Isherwood, a friend of 25 years, visited him at Cedars Sinai Hospital and wrote his impressions:

I came away with the picture of a great noble vessel sinking quietly into the deep; many of its delicate marvelous mechanisms still in perfect order, all its lights still shining.

At home on his deathbed, unable to speak owing to cancer that had metastasized, Huxley made a written request to his wife Laura for "LSD, 100 μg, intramuscular." According to her account of his death in This Timeless Moment, she obliged with an injection at 11:20 am and a second dose an hour later; Huxley died aged 69, at 5:20 pm PST on 22 November 1963.

Media coverage of Huxley's death, along with that of the writer C. S. Lewis, was overshadowed by the assassination of John F. Kennedy on the same day, less than seven hours before Huxley's death. In a 2009 article for New York magazine titled "The Eclipsed Celebrity Death Club", Christopher Bonanos wrote:

The championship trophy for badly timed death, though, goes to a pair of British writers. Aldous Huxley, the author of Brave New World, died the same day as C. S. Lewis, who wrote the Chronicles of Narnia series. Unfortunately for both of their legacies, that day was November 22, 1963, just as John Kennedy's motorcade passed the Texas School Book Depository. Huxley, at least, made it interesting: At his request, his wife shot him up with LSD a couple of hours before the end, and he tripped his way out of this world.

This coincidence served as the basis for the philosopher Peter Kreeft's book Between Heaven and Hell: A Dialog Somewhere Beyond Death with John F. Kennedy, C. S. Lewis, & Aldous Huxley, which imagines a conversation among the three men taking place in Purgatory following their deaths. The main theme of the book is a philosophical debate on the nature and identity of Jesus Christ.

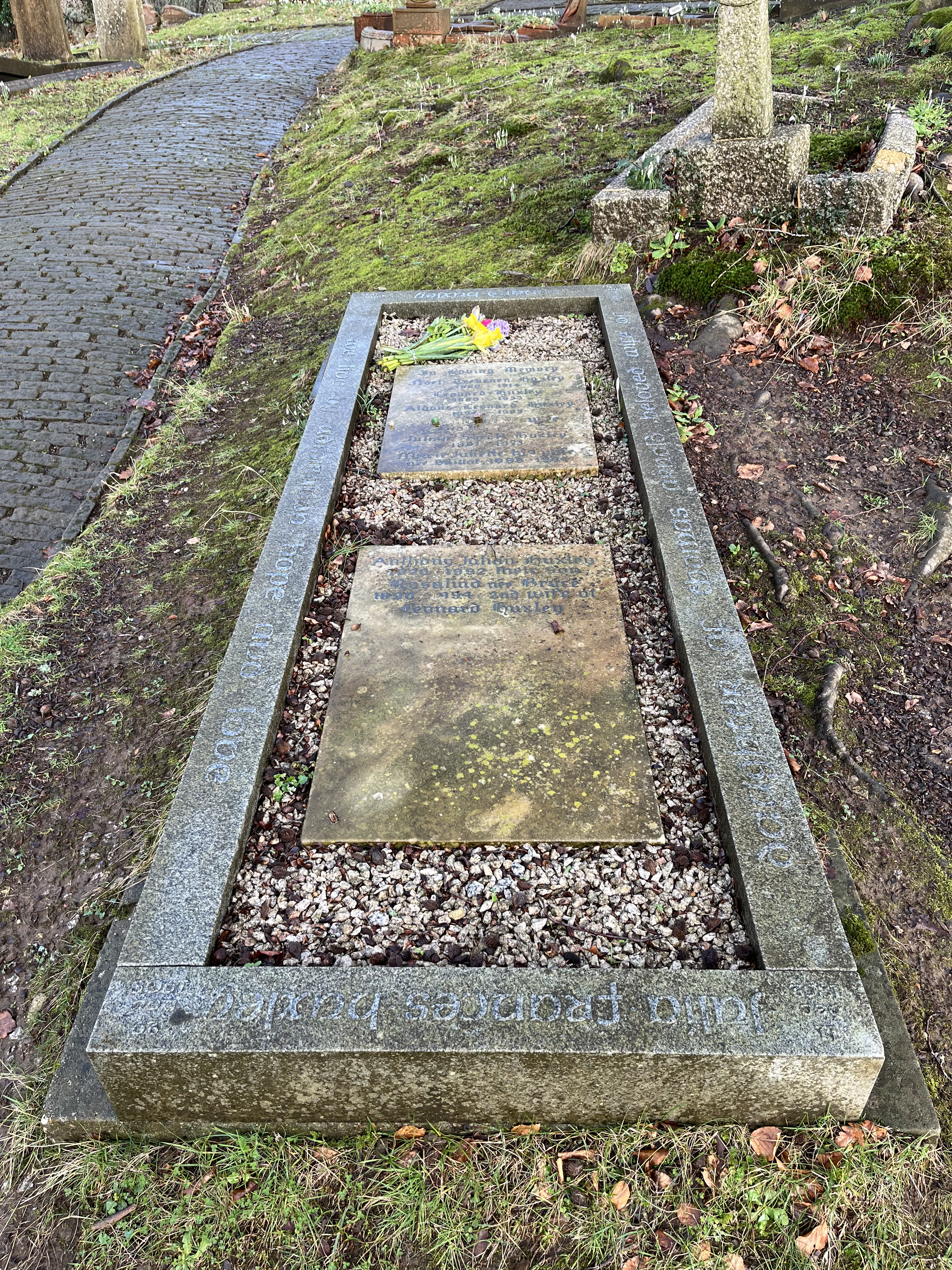
The grave of Aldous Huxley in the cemetery at the Watts Cemetery Chapel in Compton in Surrey in 2026

Huxley's memorial service took place in London in December 1963; it was led by his elder brother Julian. On 27 October 1971, his ashes were interred in the family grave at the Watts Cemetery, home of the Watts Mortuary Chapel in Compton, Guildford, Surrey, England.

Huxley had been a long-time friend of the Russian composer Igor Stravinsky, who dedicated his last orchestral composition to Huxley. What became Variations: Aldous Huxley in memoriam was begun in July 1963, completed in October 1964, and premiered by the Chicago Symphony Orchestra on 17 April 1965.

== Awards ==
- 1939: James Tait Black Memorial Prize (for After Many a Summer Dies the Swan).
- 1959: American Academy of Arts and Letters Award of Merit (for Brave New World).
- 1962: Companion of Literature (Royal Society of Literature)

== Commemoration ==
In 2021 Huxley was one of six British writers commemorated on a series of British postage stamps issued by Royal Mail to celebrate British science fiction. One classic science fiction novel from each author was depicted; Brave New World was chosen to represent Huxley.

== See also ==
- List of peace activists
