= Vedanta Press =

- Parent company: Vedanta Society of Southern California
- Founded: 1940s
- Founder: Swami Prabhavananda
- Country of origin: United States
- Headquarters location: Hollywood
- Distribution: Worldwide
- Nonfiction topics: Spirituality, Philosophy, Vedanta, Hinduism
- Official website: vedanta.com

Vedanta Press is the publishing wing of the Vedanta Society of Southern California, founded in 1930 by Swami Prabhavananda. It publishes a number of important books in Indian philosophy and the Vedanta tradition, both original works and translations of Sanskrit scriptures. Vedanta Press published collaborations, original articles, and books by leading intellectuals of the 1940s to the present, including Aldous Huxley, Christopher Isherwood, Fredrick Manchester, among others.

After its establishment in the late 1940s, Publishers Weekly reported that "Vedanta Press, the recently established Hollywood firm.... has received considerable publicity in articles appearing in Time, Life, Holiday, and Vogue." It also noted that

Vedanta Press... plans six titles for its first list of books about the Vedanta philosophy, which is currently reflected in the writings of Aldous Huxley, Christopher Isherwood, and others. [These are] the "Wisdom of God," "The Eternal Companion," "Vedanta— Its Philosophy," and "What is Vedanta?" [and translations of] "Crest-Jewel of Discrimination,"... and... the "Upanishads"

== Selected publications ==
Several of the Vedanta Press books were adopted by Colleges and Universities as a standard textbook for comparative religion and Eastern Philosophy courses. They also major reviews in leading newspapers and journals:

=== Bhagavad Gita – The Song of God ===
Through a collaboration between noted English author, Christopher Isherwood and Vedanta Scholar, Swami Prabhavananda this literary translation earned strong reviews and became one of the best selling English translations of the Hindu scripture. Aldous Huxley and Isherwood were students of Prabhavananda. Isherwood worked closely with the Swami, getting the meaning from the Swami and putting it into literary English verse and prose. Huxley wrote the introduction, in which he traces the origins and dissemination of the Perennial Philosophy through all the major religions of the world; a favorite theme of the author, "The Bhagavad Gita is perhaps the most systematic scriptural statement of the Perennial Philosophy."

- Spiritual Heritage of India (see article) by Swami Prabhavananda
- The Eternal Companion: Brahmananda, his Life and Teachings
- How to Know God: The Yoga Aphorisms of Patanjali
- Ramakrishna and his Disciples
- Vedanta for the Western World
- Vedanta for Modern Man
- Living Wisdom: Vedanta in the West
- Upanishads: Breath of the Eternal
- Bhagavad Gita – The Song of God
- Vedanta: A Simple Introduction
- Sermon on the Mount according to Vedanta
- Shankara's Crest-jewel of Discrimination
- Narada's Way of Divine Love: The Narada Bhakti Sutras
- Vedanta: A Religion, a Philosophy, a Way of Life
- Seeing God Everywhere: A Practical Guide to Spiritual Living
- Six Lighted Windows: Memories of Swamis in the West

== Vedanta and the West ==
Vedanta Press published the bimonthly Vedanta and the West from 1941 to 1970. From 1951 to 1962, Aldous Huxley, Christopher Isherwood, and Gerald Heard were editorial advisors for the journal. Karl Jackson in his book, Vedanta for the West said, "The journal is arguably the best edited Eastern spiritual periodical published in the West...

Altogether nearly 1,000 articles were published, including 47 by Aldous Huxley, 41 by Christopher Isherwood, 35 by Gerald Heard, and hundreds by senior swamis of the Ramakrishna Order.
