= Swami Prabhavananda =

Indian Philosopher (1893–1976)

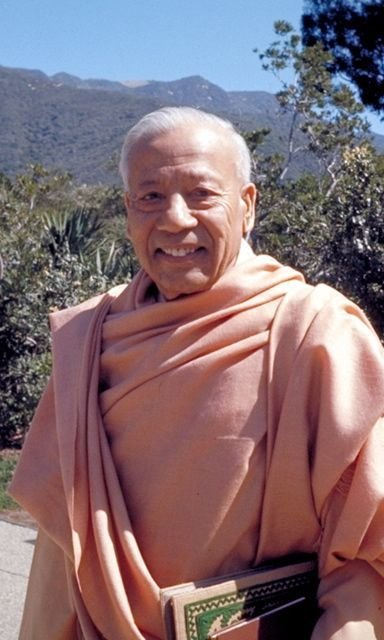
- At the Santa Barbara Vedanta Temple c. 1972

Personal life
- Born: 26 December 1893 Surmanagar Village, Bankura district, Bengal Presidency, British Raj
- Died: 4 July 1976 (aged 82) Vedanta Temple, Vedanta Place, Hollywood
- Known for: Translator of the Bhagavad Gita (with Christopher Isherwood) and the Upanishads (with Fredrick Manchester), author of the Spiritual Heritage of India
- Occupation: Monk, writer, and teacher

Religious life
- Religion: Hinduism
- Founder of: Vedanta Society of Southern California

Religious career
- Teacher: Swami Brahmananda
- Disciples: Aldous Huxley and Christopher Isherwood

Swami Prabhavananda (26 December 1893 – 4 July 1976) was an Indian philosopher, monk of the Ramakrishna Order, and religious teacher. He moved to America in 1923 to take up the role of assistant minister in the San Francisco Vedanta Society. In 1928 he was the minister of a small group in Portland, OR, but in 1930 he founded the Vedanta Society of Southern California. The Swami spent the rest of his life there, writing and collaborating with some of the most distinguished authors and intellectuals of the time, including Aldous Huxley, Christopher Isherwood, and Gerald Heard.

== Biography ==
Born in India, he joined the Ramakrishna Order after graduating from Calcutta university in 1914. He was initiated by Swami Brahmananda, the spiritual son of Sri Ramakrishna, and the first president of the Ramakrishna Order, headquartered in Belur, West Bengal.

In 1923, he was sent to the United States of America. Initially, he worked as an assistant minister of the Vedanta Society of San Francisco. After two years, he established the Vedanta Society of Portland. In December 1929, he moved to Los Angeles, where he founded the Vedanta Society of Southern California in 1930.

Under his administration, the Vedanta Society of Southern California grew over the years to become the largest Vedanta Society in the West, with monasteries in Hollywood and Trabuco Canyon and convents in Hollywood and Santa Barbara.

Prabhavananda was a scholar who wrote a number of books on Vedanta and Indian religious scriptures and commentary. He was assisted on several of the projects by Christopher Isherwood and Frederick Manchester. His comprehensive knowledge of philosophy and religion attracted such disciples as Aldous Huxley and Gerald Heard.

Prabhavananda died on the bicentennial of America's independence, 4 July 1976, and on the 74th anniversary of the death, or mahasamadhi, of Swami Vivekananda, the founder of the Ramakrishna Order in India and many of the Vedanta centers in America and Europe.

== Influence ==
Prabhavananda's book The Spiritual Heritage of India was reviewed in the academic journal Philosophy. The review stated that "Swami Prabhavananda has written a charming and authoritative book on the spiritual heritage of India, by which he means that heritage in consonance with the Vedic tradition and its culmination in Vedanta" (p. 376). The reviewer stated that "throughout the book breathes an air of relaxed simplicity and conviction.... I was particularly refreshed by the absence of attacks on science, materialism, naturalism, and other such means to spiritual fulfilment" (pp. 376–377).

Prabhavananda and Isherwood's translation of the ’’Bhagavad Gita – The Song of God’’ was reviewed by Time Magazine in 1945. Time described the translation as "a distinguished literary work" that was "simpler and freer than other English translations (three of which have been published in the past year).... It may help U.S. readers to understand not only the Gita itself, but also its influence on American letters through one of its greatest U.S. admirers, Ralph Waldo Emerson" (pp. 98, 100).

== Written works ==
=== Original works ===
- Dynamic Religion (1927)
- Wisdom of God (Srimad Bhagavatam) (1943)
- The Spiritual Heritage of India (1963).
  - Editions: Doubleday, 1962 (original); Anchor, 1964; Sri Ramakrishna Math, 1977, ISBN 81-7120-145-8; Vedanta Press, 1979, ISBN 0-87481-035-3; Vedanta Press, 1980; Cosmos, 2003, ISBN 81-7755-746-7
- Vedic Religion and Philosophy
- The Eternal Companion (Life and teachings of Swami Brahmananda)
- The Sermon on the Mount according to Vedanta
- Religion in Practice
- Yoga and Mysticism

=== Translations ===
- The Wisdom of God (Srimat Bhagavatam), ISBN 81-7823-315-0
- Shankara's Crest-jewel of discrimination (Viveka Choodamani) - with Christopher Isherwood, ISBN 0-87481-038-8
- The Upanishads - with Frederick Manchester, ISBN 0-451-52848-4
- Bhagavad Gita – The Song of God - with Christopher Isherwood, ISBN 0-451-52844-1
- How to know God, the Yoga aphorisms of Patanjali (Patanjala Yogasutra) - with Christopher Isherwood, ISBN 0-87481-041-8
- Memories of a Loving Soul: Swami Premananda, Teachings and Reminiscences
- Narada's Way of Divine Love (Narada Bhakti Sutras)

== Audio and video works ==
- What is Religion? - CD
- Eight Limbs of Yoga - DVD
- Blessed Are the Pure In Heart and Be Still - DVD

== See also ==
- Vedanta Society
- Bhagavad Gita – The Song of God
- Yoga in America
- Vedanta Society Of Southern California, Ramakrishna Monastery
- Ramakrishna Order
- Santa Barbara Vedanta Temple
