= Vedanta Society =

Religious organisation

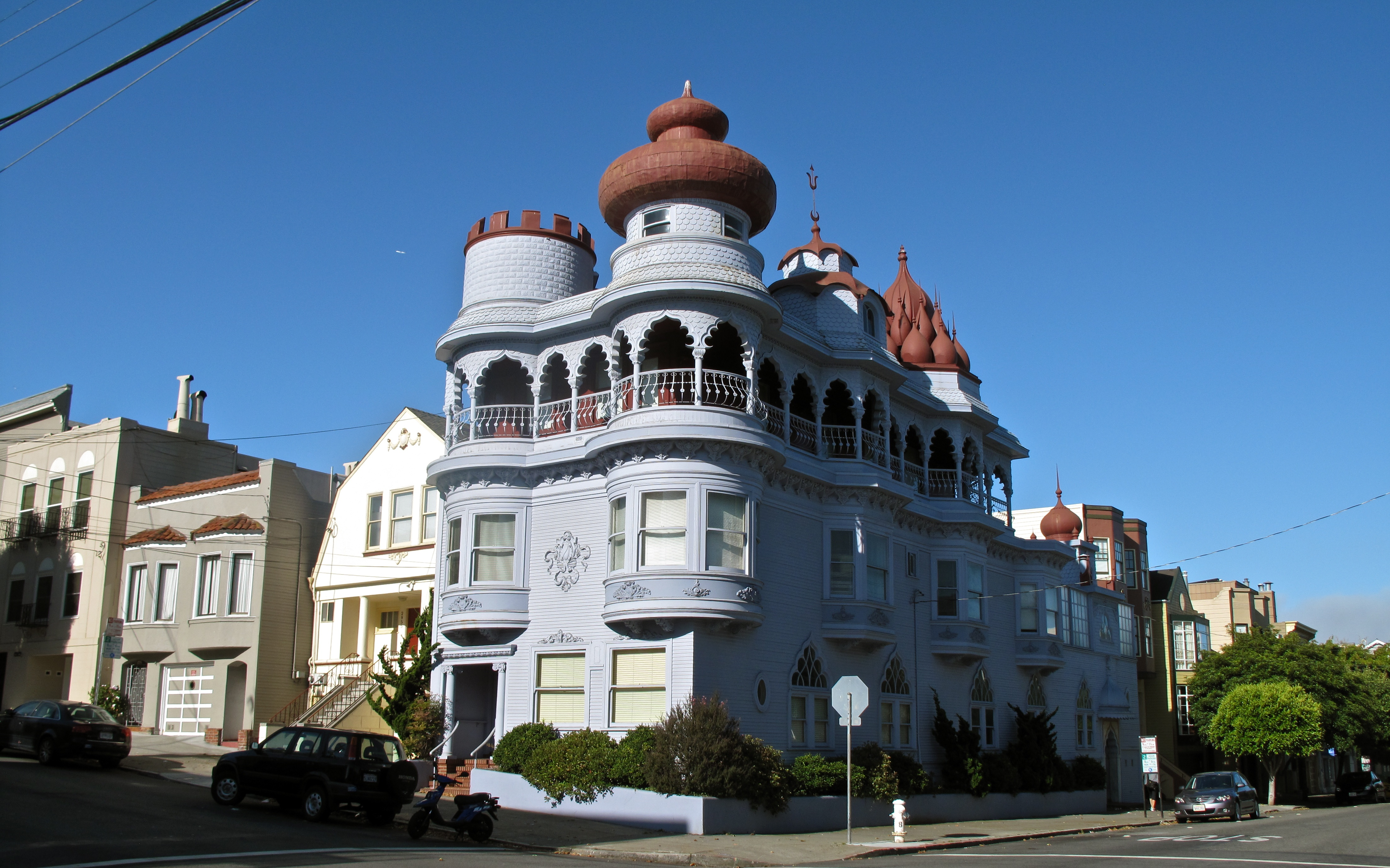
The first temple of the Vedanta Society of San Francisco

Vedanta Societies are organizations formed for the study, practice, and propagation of Vedanta, specifically Advaita Vedanta. Primarily located outside of India, Vedanta Societies serve as the Western branches of the Ramakrishna Mission.

Branches of the Ramakrishna Order located outside India are under the spiritual guidance of the Ramakrishna Order. Many of the Western Vedanta societies have resident monks, and several centers have resident nuns. Carl Jackson writes that the Vedanta Societies first brought the teachings of Vedanta to America.

The work of the Vedanta Societies in the west has primarily been devoted to spiritual and pastoral activities, though many of them do some form of social service. The first Vedanta Society outside India was founded by the Indian Hindu monk Swami Vivekananda in New York in November 1894. In 1900, on Swami Vivekananda's second trip to the west, he established the San Francisco Center.

In the mid-20th century, the societies became intellectual centers in the United States, attracting figures including Aldous Huxley, Gerald Heard, Christopher Isherwood, Huston Smith, J.D. Salinger, and Joseph Campbell.

== History ==
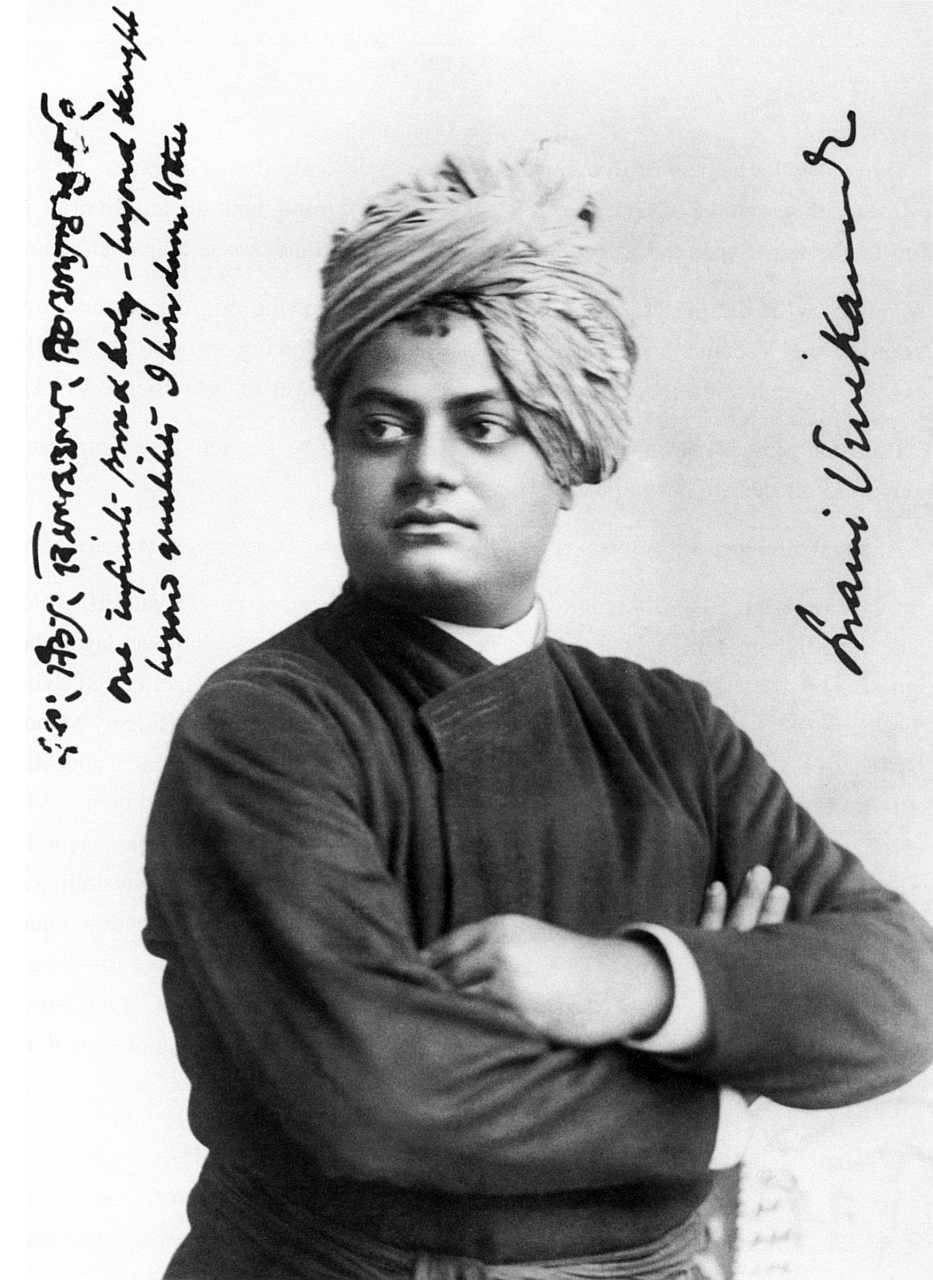
Swami Vivekananda, the founder of the first Vedanta Society in the West, in New York City

The Vedanta Society was founded by Swami Vivekananda on his first trip to the West. Swami Vivekananda, whose guru was the spiritual leader Ramakrishna, came to the United States to represent Hinduism at the 1893 Parliament of the World's Religions in Chicago. Although his primary intent for the journey was to raise money for humanitarian reform work in India, the reception he received inspired him to establish a separate Western mission.

After the 1893 Parliament of Religions in Chicago, Swami Vivekananda went on a speaking tour of the Midwest and the East Coast, including Chicago, Detroit, Boston, and New York. In November 1894, he established the first Vedanta Society in New York, and the group gained a physical location in January 1895.

In 1895, Vivekananda broke off his speaking tour and held a six-week retreat at Thousand Island Park, where he trained and initiated his first disciples to continue the work after his return to India. Vivekananda focused on establishing an American Vedanta that emphasized practical spiritual teachings, adapting the tradition to Western audiences.

On Vivekananda's second trip to the West (1899-1900), he expanded the movement to the West Coast, founding the Vedanta Society of Northern California and lecturing extensively in the San Francisco Bay Area.

Before returning to India, Vivekananda assigned his fellow disciples from the Ramakrishna Order, including Abhedananda, Turiyananda, and Saradananda, to lead the growing network of American centers.

== Major centers ==
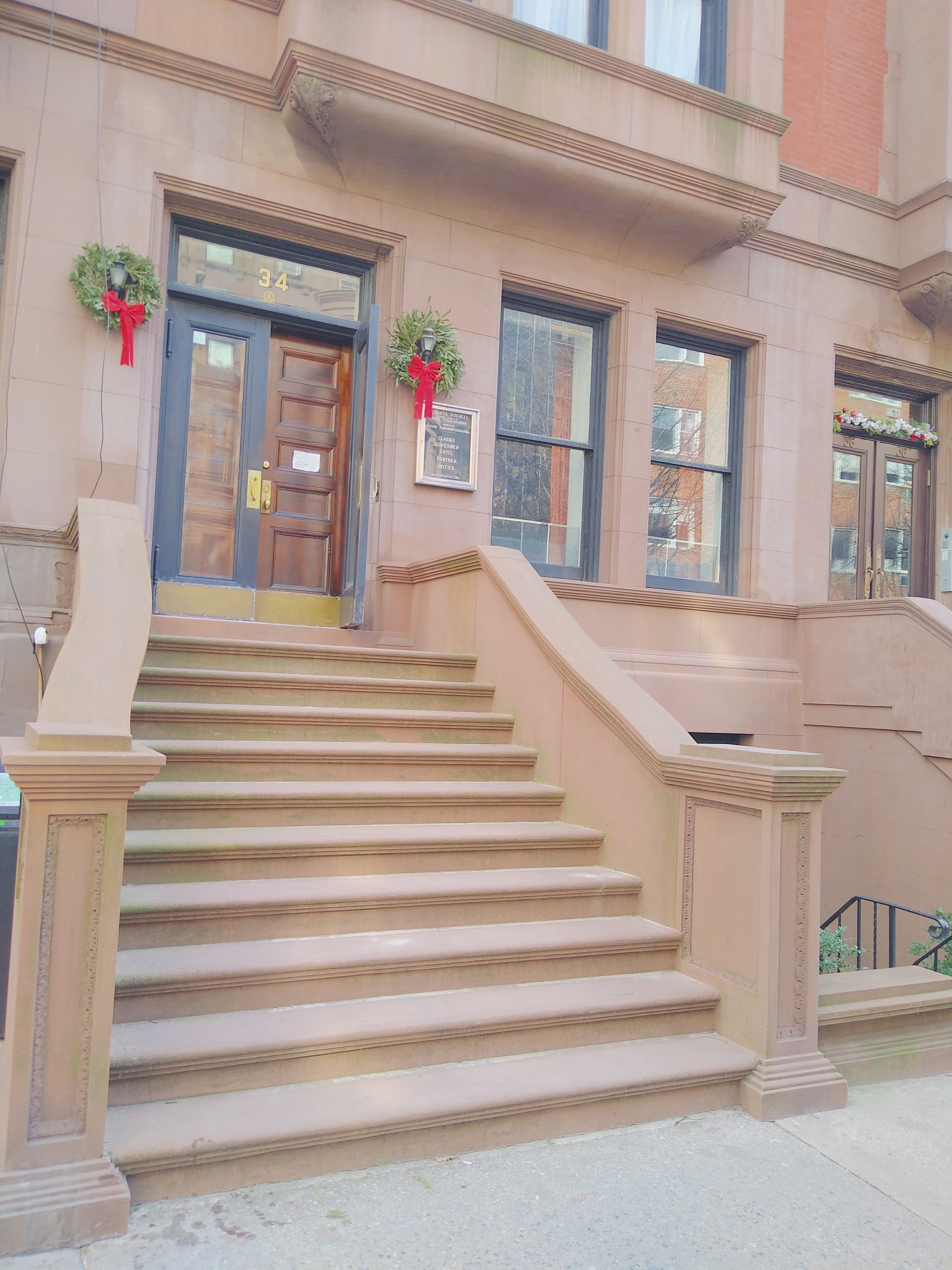
Vedanta Society of New York

=== Vedanta Society of New York ===
The Vedanta Society in New York was the first Vedanta society. It was established by Swami Vivekananda in 1894, on his first trip to the United States. It is currently led by Swami Sarvapriyananda.

In 1897, Vivekananda appointed Swami Abhedananda to lead the New York branch. According to Jackson, for the first two decades of the 20th century, Swami Abhedananda was the "best-known Asian religious teacher in the United States." Other notable swamis who have led the center include Swami Paramananda, Swami Bodhananda (1906–1950), Swami Pavitrananada (1951–1977), and Swami Tathagatananda (1977–2016).

In 1921, the Society acquired its permanent headquarters at 34 West 71st Street through a gift from Mary Morton, daughter of Levi P. Morton, former Vice President and a former governor of New York.

=== Vedanta Society of Northern California ===
Founded in 1900 by Swami Vivekananda during his second visit to the United States, the San Francisco society was initially led by Swami Trigunatitananda. In 1905, the society completed a building often described as "the first Hindu Temple in the Whole Western World." The temple, built out of a large Victorian house, incorporated elements of traditional Hindu temple architecture, and architectural historian Arjit Sen describes the ornamental facade of the temple as having been designed to present Hinduism to local audiences.

The building survived the 1906 San Francisco Earthquake. In 1914, Swami Trigunatitananda was fatally injured when a homemade bomb was detonated during a service by a former student.

There was a series of swamis in charge until Swami Ashokananda led the society from 1932 until his death in 1969. Ashokananda expanded the Northern California center to include a retreat in Olema, Marin County, California, as well as temples in Berkeley, Sacramento, and convents in San Francisco and San Rafael. In 1948, the society was renamed from the Vedanta Society of San Francisco to the Vedanta Society of Northern California. In 1959, Ashokananda dedicated the "New Temple" (at Fillmore and Vallejo) to serve as its headquarters.

The current minister-in-charge is Swami Tattwamayananda.

=== Vedanta Society of Southern California ===
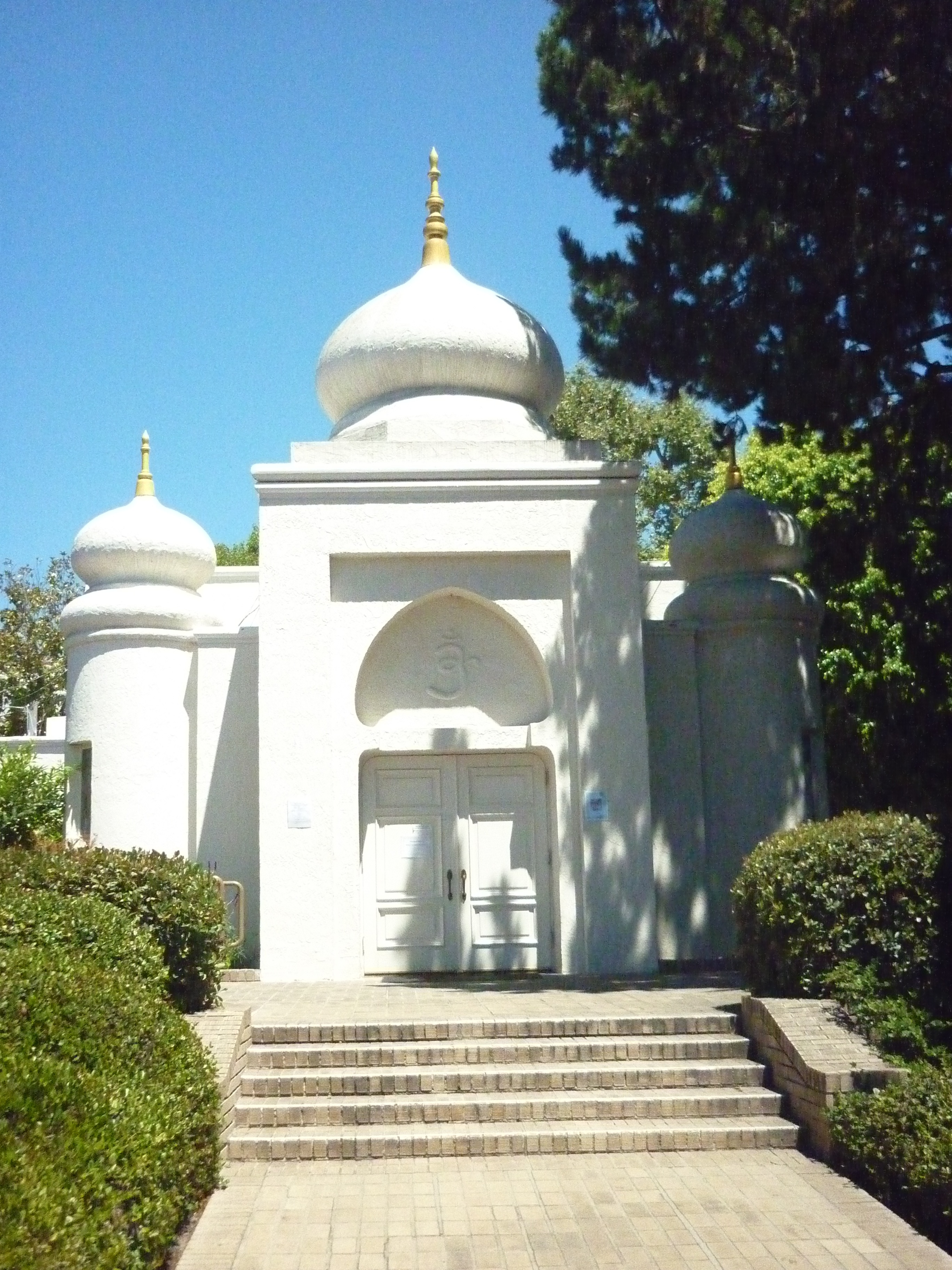
Hollywood Vedanta Temple

The Vedanta Society of Southern California was founded by Swami Prabhavananda in 1930, originally located in the home of a disciple, that became the future Hollywood Vedanta Temple. The society struggled in the early years, but by the late 1930s, the Swami started to attract notable authors and intellectuals, who were curious about the ancient Vedanta philosophy, and wanted to hear more from an adept. In 1938 a formal temple was built on the former rose garden of the home.

Prabhavananda was head of the center until his death on July 4, 1976. Swami Swahananda, who had been the head of the Berkeley Society took over and was head of the center until his death in 2010. Swami Sarvadevananda continues as the spiritual leader to the present.

==== Ramakrishna Monastery, Trabuco Canyon ====
In the early 1940s, Gerald Heard decided to establish his own monastery in Trabuco Canyon, in Orange County, Southern California, to practice intense spiritual exercises with a strict and physically demanding schedule, feeling that Prabhavananda was too lax. Aldous Huxley spent six weeks there working on his Perennial Philosophy. However, there were not enough followers to support the effort, so in 1949 he donated the entire property, buildings and furnishing to the Vedanta Society of Southern California, which became the Ramakrishna Monastery.

=== Vedanta Center of Greater Washington DC, Maryland ===
The center was established in April 1997 as part of the Vedanta Society of Southern California under the guidance of Swami Swahananda and Ramakrishna Math and Mission in Belur Math.

Swami Atmajnanananda is the resident minister at the Maryland center.

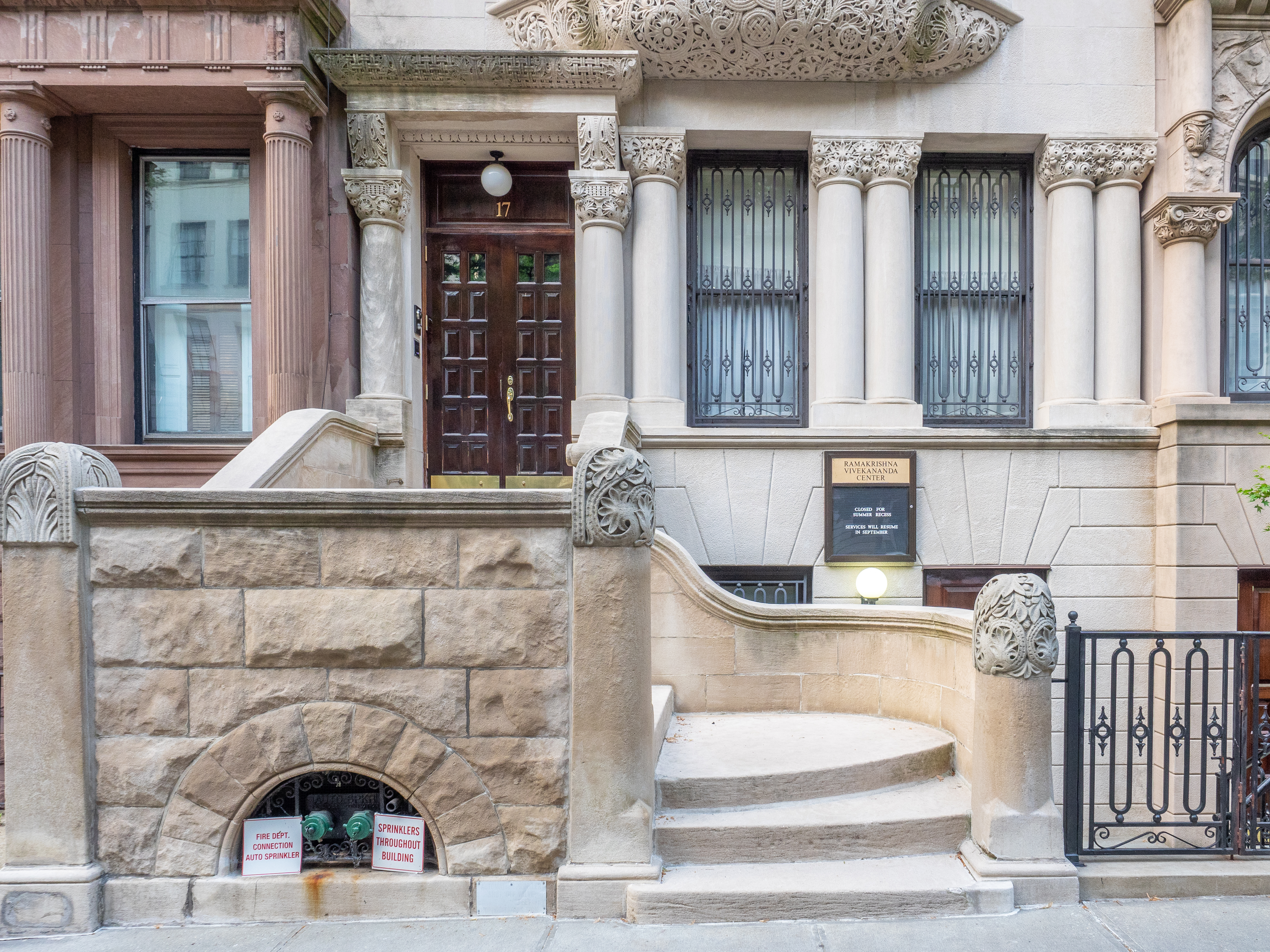
Ramakrishna-Vivekananda Center Temple

=== Ramakrishna-Vivekananda Center, New York ===
The Ramakrishna-Vivekananda Center located on the upper East Side of Manhattan Island was founded in 1933 by Swami Nikhilananda, when he and a group of followers broke off from the Vedanta Society of New York, while still maintaining its affiliation with the Ramakrishna Order in India.

The center has a main temple and monastery in New York City and a retreat property at Thousand Island Park on the Hudson, where Swami Vivekananda stayed for 7 weeks in the summer of 1895.

After Nikhilananda's death in 1973, Swami Adiswarananda took over, until his death in 2007. Currently, Swami Yuktatmananda heads the center.

=== Vedanta Society of St. Louis ===
The St. Louis Vedanta Society was founded in 1938 by Swami Satprakashananda (1888–1979). The Swami was a monk of the Ramakrishna Order and a disciple of Swami Brahmananda (considered to be the spiritual son of Ramakrishna) and first president of the Ramakrishna Order. The swami was a sought-after scholar and wrote several books on Vedanta. He was recommended by Aldous Huxley to a young Huston Smith who was moving to St. Louis in 1947, as someone who could teach Vedanta philosophy in depth. Huston Smith took weekly tutorial sessions with the Swami for a decade, which became the foundation of the course, the TV Series and Book, all titled, The Religions of Man.

When the Society wanted to buy a building in a prominent and prestigious Church Row neighborhood in St. Louis, the swami was denied, as he had "brown skin", so Huston Smith and his wife Kendra bought the property and then turned it over to the society.

Swami Chetanananda was the assistant minister under Swami Prabhavananda at the Vedanta Society of Southern California from 1971 to 1979. As Satprakashananda's health declined, Chetanananda was assigned to St. Louis as the assistant there.

After Satprakashananda died, Swami Chetanananda became the head of the center. Chetanananda continued the St. Louis Center's tradition of writing and translating important books on Vedanta and the early founders of the Ramakrishna Order.

=== Ramakrishna Vedanta Society, Boston ===
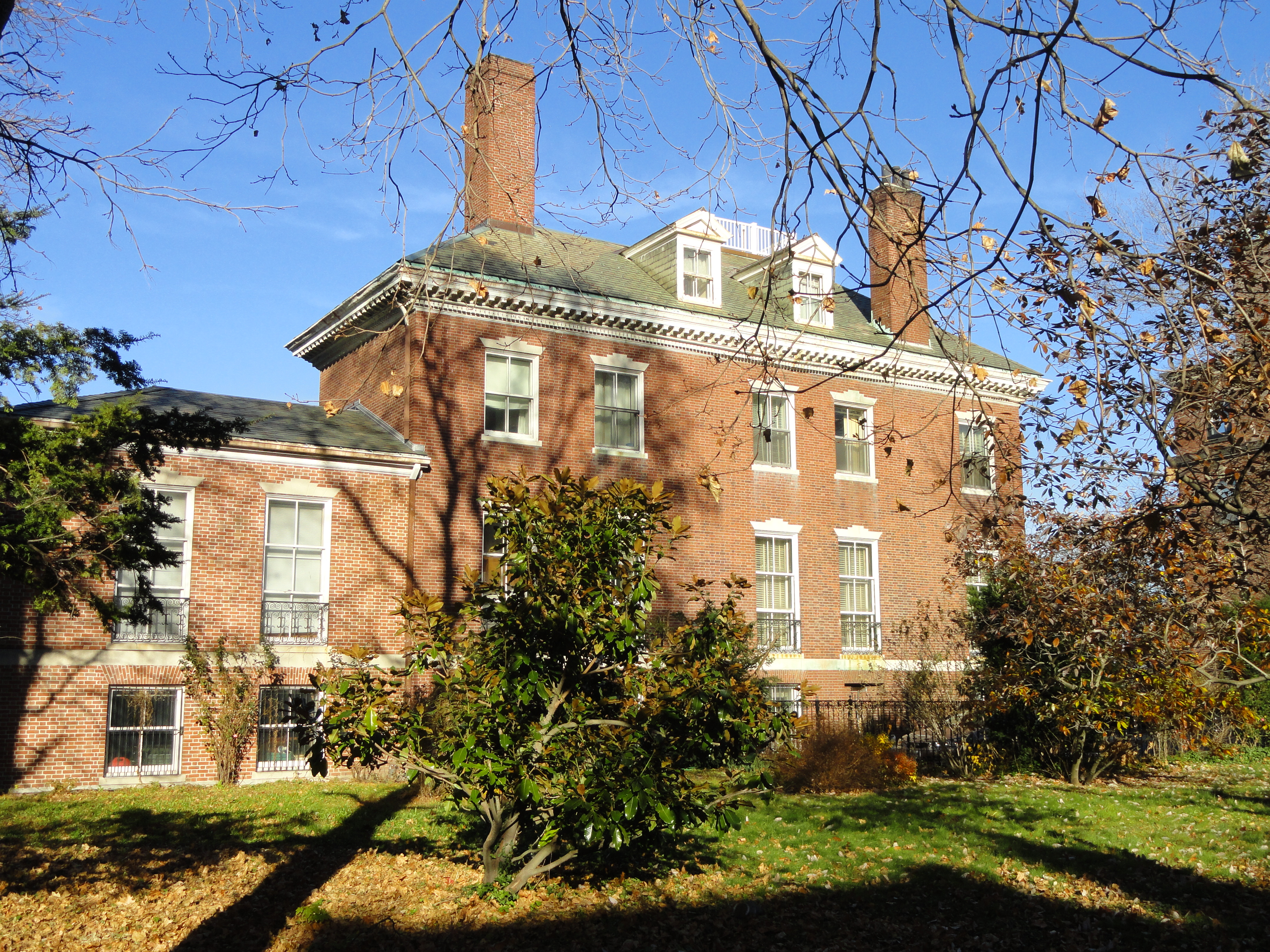
Ramakrishna Vedanta Society, Boston

The Ramakrishna Vedanta Society, Boston was founded in 1909 by Swami Paramananda.

In 1941 it was moved to its present location at 58 Deerfield Street, Boston, MA, under the leadership of Swami Akhilananda. After Akhilananda died in 1962, Swami Sarvagatananda led the Vedanta Society for forty years until his formal retirement in 2002.

Swami Tyagananda became the head of the Society in 2002, after the retirement of Swami Sarvagatananda. The Society provides spiritual seekers and students from local colleges and universities, participates in interfaith gatherings and promotes coexistence of the various religious traditions of the world.

=== Vedanta Society of Portland ===
After an early attempt to start a Portland Vedanta study group in 1925 by Swami Prabhavananda, the center was established in 1932 by Swami Devatmananda. Devatmananda also acquired the large retreat property 20 miles outside of Portland.

Swami Aseshananda, who had been the assistant minister under Swami Prabhavananda in Hollywood, took over in 1955 and remained in charge until his death in 1996. In Aseshananda's later years, he was the most senior monk in the Ramakrishna Order and the last living monastic disciple of Sarada Devi, the wife of Ramakrishna.

== Publications ==
The magazine Voice of Freedom was published through the Vedanta Society using a printing press at the Northern California center. It commenced publication in 1909.

In 1930, Swami Prabhavananda established Vedanta Press, which oversaw the publication of books that would become standard textbooks for college-level courses, including The Spiritual Heritage of India and the Bhagavad Gita – The Song of God, translated by the Swami and Christopher Isherwood, with an introduction by Aldous Huxley. By the early 1950s Aldous Huxley, Christopher Isherwood, and Gerald Heard had joined the editorial board of the Society's journal, Vedanta In the West.

The swamis of the tradition have written and translated a variety of texts on Vedanta. Swami Nikhilananda produced some of the most important English translations of Vedanta scripture and literature including, The Gospel of Ramakrishna. Notable students of Nikhilananda include Joseph Campbell, who helped edit the Gospel, and J.D. Salinger, who began his association with the Swami shortly after returning from WWII. Swami Chetanananda's books include the teachings of the Ramakrishna Order's most important leaders, as well as biographies of many of the Direct Disciples of Ramakrishna. Swami Atmajnanananda is a scholar in Indian philosophy who contributed various articles and translations to some of the books and magazines of the Ramakrishna Order. One of his articles was published in the edited volume Living Wisdom: Vedanta in the West. Atmajnanananda also authored Jiva Gosvamin's Tattvasandarbha: A Study on the Philosophical and Sectarian Development of the Gaudiya Vaisnava Movement, published by Motilal Banarsidass in 1986.

== See also ==
- Advaita Vedanta

== Sources ==
- Jackson, Carl (1994). Vedanta for the West. Indiana University Press. ISBN 0-253-33098-X.
- Vrajaprana, Pravrajika (1994). Living Wisdom: Vedanta in the West. Vedanta Press. ISBN 978-0-874-810-554.
- Chetanananda, Swami (1997). God Lived with Them. Vedanta Society of St. Louis. ISBN 978-8-175051-98-0.
- Sawyer, Dana (2002). Aldous Huxley: A Biography. Crossroads Publishing Company. ISBN 0-8245-1987-6.
- Murray, Nicholas (2003). Aldous Huxley: A Biography. St. Martin's Press. ISBN 0-312-30237-1.
- Davis, Erik (2006). The Visionary State. Chronicle Books. ISBN 978-0-8118-4835-0.
- Goldberg, Phillip (2010). American Veda. Harmony Books. ISBN 978-0-385-52134-5.
- Sawyer, Dana (2014). Huston Smith: Wisdom Keeper. Fons Vital. ISBN 978-1891785-290.
