= Fads and Fallacies in the Name of Science =

1957 book by Martin Gardner

- Cover of the 1957 revised edition
- Author: Martin Gardner
- Language: English
- Subjects: Science, pseudoscience, skepticism, quackery
- Publisher: Dover Publications
- Publication date: June 1, 1957, 2nd. ed.
- Publication place: United States
- Media type: Print (Paperback)
- Pages: 373
- ISBN: 978-0-486-20394-2
- OCLC: 18598918
- Followed by: Science: Good, Bad and Bogus (1981); Order and Surprise (1983)

Fads and Fallacies in the Name of Science (1957)—originally published in 1952 as In the Name of Science: An Entertaining Survey of the High Priests and Cultists of Science, Past and Present—was Martin Gardner's second book. A survey of what it described as pseudosciences and cult beliefs, it became a founding document in the nascent scientific skepticism movement. Michael Shermer said of it: "Modern skepticism has developed into a science-based movement, beginning with Martin Gardner's 1952 classic".

The book debunks what it characterises as pseudoscience and the pseudo-scientists who propagate it.

== Contents ==
=== Synopsis ===
Fads and Fallacies in the Name of Science starts with a brief survey of the spread of the ideas of "cranks" and "pseudo-scientists", attacking the credulity of the popular press and the irresponsibility of publishing houses in helping to propagate these ideas. Cranks often cite historical cases where ideas were rejected which are now accepted as right. Gardner acknowledges that such cases occurred, and describes some of them, but says that times have changed: "If anything, scientific journals err on the side of permitting questionable theses to be published". Gardner acknowledges that "among older scientists ... one may occasionally meet with irrational prejudice against a new point of view", but adds that "a certain degree of dogma ... is both necessary and desirable" because otherwise "science would be reduced to shambles by having to examine every new-fangled notion that came along."

Gardner says that cranks have two common characteristics. The first "and most important" is that they work in almost total isolation from the scientific community. Gardner defines the community as an efficient network of communication within scientific fields, together with a co-operative process of testing new theories. This process allows for apparently bizarre theories to be published—such as Einstein's theory of relativity, which initially met with considerable opposition; it was never dismissed as the work of a crackpot, and it soon met with almost universal acceptance. But the crank "stands entirely outside the closely integrated channels through which new ideas are introduced and evaluated. He does not send his findings to the recognized journals or, if he does, they are rejected for reasons which in the vast majority of cases are excellent."

The second characteristic of the crank (which also contributes to his or her isolation) is the tendency to paranoia. There are five ways in which this tendency is likely to be manifested.

1. The pseudo-scientist considers himself a genius.
2. He regards other researchers as stupid, dishonest or both.
3. He believes there is a campaign against his ideas, a campaign comparable to the persecution of Galileo or Pasteur. He may attribute his "persecution" to a conspiracy by a scientific "masonry" who are unwilling to admit anyone to their inner sanctum without appropriate initiation.
4. Instead of side-stepping the mainstream, the pseudo-scientist attacks it head-on: The most revered scientist is Einstein, so Gardner writes that Einstein is the most likely establishment figure to be attacked.
5. He has a tendency to use complex jargon, often making up words and phrases. Gardner compares this to the way that schizophrenics talk in what psychiatrists call "neologisms", "words which have meaning to the patient, but sound like Jabberwocky to everyone else."

These psychological traits are in varying degrees demonstrated throughout the remaining chapters of the book, in which Gardner examines particular "fads" he labels pseudo-scientific. His writing became the source book from which many later studies of pseudo-science were taken (e.g. Encyclopedia of Pseudo-science).

=== Chapters ===
As per the subtitle of the book, "The curious theories of modern pseudoscientists and the strange, amusing and alarming cults that surround them" are discussed in the chapters as listed.

1. In the Name of Science
  - the introductory chapter
2. Flat and Hollow
  - the Flat Earth theory of Wilbur Glenn Voliva
  - the Hollow Earth theories of John Cleves Symmes, Jr. and Cyrus Reed Teed
3. Monsters of Doom
  - Immanuel Velikovsky’s Worlds in Collision
  - William Whiston’s A New Theory of the Earth
  - Ignatius Donnelly’s Ragnarok; Hanns Hörbiger’s Welteislehre and Hörbiger’s disciple Hans Schindler Bellamy.
4. The Forteans
  - Charles Fort, Tiffany Thayer and the Fortean Society
  - The Hutchins-Adler Great Books Movement: "most of them regard scientists, on the whole, as a stupid lot."
5. Flying Saucers
  - Kenneth Arnold, the Mantell UFO Incident
  - Raymond Palmer, Richard Shaver, Donald Keyhoe, Frank Scully, Gerald Heard and the Unidentified flying object movement.
6. Zig-Zag-and-Swirl
  - Alfred Lawson and his "Lawsonomy"
7. Down with Einstein!
  - Joseph Battell, Thomas H. Graydon, George Francis Gillette, Jeremiah J. Callahan and others.
8. Sir Isaac Babson
  - Roger Babson and the Gravity Research Foundation.
9. Dowsing Rods and Doodlebugs
  - Solco Walle Tromp and radiesthesia
  - Kenneth Roberts, Henry Goss and their dowsing.
10. Under the Microscope
  - Andrew Crosse, Henry Charlton Bastian, Charles Wentworth Littlefield and others who claimed to observe spontaneous generation of living forms.
11. Geology versus Genesis
  - Philip Henry Gosse and his Omphalos
  - George McCready Price and The New Geology
  - Mortimer Adler’s writings on evolution.
  - Hilaire Belloc’s debate with H. G. Wells.
12. Lysenkoism
  - Lamarck and Lamarckism; Lysenko and Lysenkoism
13. Apologists for Hate
  - Hans F. K. Günther and “nordicism”
  - Charles Carroll, Madison Grant, Lothrop Stoddard, and “scientific racism”.
14. Atlantis and Lemuria
  - Ignatius Donnelly (again), Lewis Spence and Atlantis
  - Madame Blavatsky, James Churchward and Lemuria
15. The Great Pyramid
  - John Taylor, Charles Piazzi Smyth, Charles Taze Russell and others with their theories about the Great Pyramid of Giza.
16. Medical Cults
  - Samuel Hahnemann, The Organon of the Healing Art, and homeopathy.
  - Naturopathy, with iridiagnosis, zone therapy and Alexander technique.
  - Andrew Taylor Still and osteopathy.
  - Daniel D. Palmer and chiropractic.
17. Medical Quacks
  - Elisha Perkins
  - Albert Abrams and his defender Upton Sinclair.
  - Ruth Drown
  - Dinshah Pestanji Framji Ghadiali
  - color therapy
  - Gurdjieff
  - Aleister Crowley
  - Edgar Cayce
  - (in the Appendix) Hoxsey Therapy and Krebiozen
18. Food Faddists
  - Horace Fletcher and Fletcherism
  - William Howard Hay and the Dr. Hay diet
  - Vegetarianism ("We need not be concerned here with the ethical arguments...")
  - J. I. Rodale and organic farming
  - Rudolf Steiner, Ehrenfried Pfeiffer, anthroposophy and biodynamic agriculture.
  - Gayelord Hauser
  - Nutrilite
  - Dudley J. LeBlanc and Hadacol
19. Throw Away Your Glasses!
  - William Horatio Bates, the Bates method, Aldous Huxley, The Art of Seeing.
20. Eccentric Sexual Theories
  - Arabella Kenealy
  - Bernarr Macfadden
  - John R. Brinkley
  - Frank Harris
  - John Humphrey Noyes and the Oneida Community
  - Alice Bunker Stockham and “karezza”
21. Orgonomy
  - Wilhelm Reich and “orgone”
22. Dianetics
  - L. Ron Hubbard, Dianetics: The Modern Science of Mental Health. (The term Scientology had only just been introduced when Gardner's book was published.)
23. General Semantics, Etc.
  - Alfred Korzybski, Samuel I. Hayakawa and “general semantics”
  - Jacob L. Moreno and “psychodrama”
24. From Bumps to Handwriting
  - Francis Joseph Gall and phrenology
  - physiognomy; palmistry
  - graphology
25. ESP and PK
  - Joseph Banks Rhine, extra-sensory perception and psychokinesis
  - Nandor Fodor
  - Upton Sinclair (again) and Mental Radio
  - Max Freedom Long
26. Bridey Murphy and Other Matters
  - Morey Bernstein and Bridey Murphy
  - A final plea for orthodoxy and responsibility in publishing

== History ==
The 1957 Dover publication is a revised and expanded version of In the Name of Science, which was published by G. P. Putnam's Sons in 1952. The subtitle boldly states the book's theme: "The curious theories of modern pseudoscientists and the strange, amusing and alarming cults that surround them. A study in human gullibility". As of 2005, it had been reprinted at least 30 times.

The book was expanded from an article first published in the Antioch Review in 1950, and in the preface to the first edition, Gardner thanks the Review for allowing him to develop the article as the starting point of his book. Not all material in the article is carried over to the book. For example, in the article, Gardner writes:

The reader may wonder why a competent scientist does not publish a detailed refutation of Reich's absurd biological speculations. The answer is that the informed scientist doesn't care, and would, in fact, damage his reputation by taking the time to undertake such a thankless task.

And comments in a footnote:

It is not within the scope of this paper, however, to discuss technical criteria by which hypotheses are given high, low, or negative degrees of confirmation. Our purpose is simply to glance at several examples of a type of scientific activity which fails completely to conform to scientific standards, but at the same time is the result of such intricate mental activity that it wins temporary acceptance by many laymen insufficiently informed to recognize the scientist's incompetence. Although there obviously is no sharp line separating competent from incompetent research, and there are occasions when a scientific "orthodoxy" may delay the acceptance of novel views, the fact remains that the distance between the work of competent scientists and the speculations of a Voliva or Velikovsky is so great that a qualitative difference emerges which justifies the label of "pseudo-science." Since the time of Galileo the history of pseudo-science has been so completely outside the history of science that the two streams touch only in the rarest of instances.

While in the book, Gardner writes:

If someone announces that the moon is made of green cheese, the professional astronomer cannot be expected to climb down from his telescope and write a detailed refutation. “A fairly complete textbook of physics would be only part of the answer to Velikovsky,” writes Prof. Laurence J. Lafleur, in his excellent article on "Cranks and Scientists" (Scientific Monthly, Nov., 1951), "and it is therefore not surprising that the scientist does not find the undertaking worth while."

And in the wrap-up of the chapter:

Just as an experienced doctor is able to diagnose certain ailments the instant a new patient walks into his office, or a police officer learns to recognize criminal types from subtle behavior clues which escape the untrained eye, so we, perhaps, may learn to recognize the future scientific crank when we first encounter him.

== Reception ==
A contemporary review in the Pittsburgh Post-Gazette particularly welcomed Gardner's critical remarks about Hoxsey Therapy and about Krebiozen, both of which were being advanced as anti-cancer measures at that time. The review concluded that the book "should help to counteract some amusing and some positively harmful cults, the existence of which is all too often promoted by irresponsible journalism."

The work has often been mentioned in subsequent books and articles. Louis Lasagna, in his book The Doctors' Dilemmas, considered it to be a "superb account of scientific cults, fads, and frauds" and wrote that "This talented writer combines solid fact with a pleasing style."

Sociologist of religion Anson D. Shupe took in general a positive attitude, and praises Gardner for his humor. But he says

If there is a single criticism to be made of Gardner ... it is that he accepts too comfortably the conventional wisdom, or accepted social reality, of current twentieth-century science and middle-class American Christianity. Somehow it is evident (to me at least) that he is implicitly making a pact with the reader to evaluate these fringe groups in terms of their own shared presumptions about what is "normal". Thus he is quite confident throwing around labels like "quack", "crank" and "preposterous". In science the use of such value judgments can be quite time-bound; likewise in religions where today's heresy may become tomorrow's orthodoxy. The odds of course are always on the side of the writer criticizing fringe groups because statistically speaking so few of them survive. However, when a group does weather its infancy and go on to prosper, invariably its original detractors look a bit more arbitrary than they did initially, and then the shoe is on the other foot.

In the 1980s a fierce interchange took place between Gardner and Colin Wilson. In The Quest for Wilhelm Reich Wilson wrote of this book

(Gardner) writes about various kinds of cranks with the conscious superiority of the scientist, and in most cases one can share his sense of the victory of reason. But after half a dozen chapters this non-stop superiority begins to irritate; you begin to wonder about the standards that make him so certain he is always right. He asserts that the scientist, unlike the crank, does his best to remain open-minded. So how can he be so sure that no sane person has ever seen a flying saucer, or used a dowsing rod to locate water? And that all the people he disagrees with are unbalanced fanatics? A colleague of the positivist philosopher A. J. Ayer once remarked wryly "I wish I was as certain of anything as he seems to be about everything". Martin Gardner produces the same feeling.

By Wilson's own account, up to that time he and Gardner had been friends, but Gardner took offence. In February 1989 Gardner wrote a letter published in The New York Review of Books describing Wilson as "England’s leading journalist of the occult, and a firm believer in ghosts, poltergeists, levitations, dowsing, PK (psychokinesis), ESP, and every other aspect of the psychic scene". Shortly afterwards, Wilson replied, defending himself and adding "What strikes me as so interesting is that when Mr. Gardner—and his colleagues of CSICOP—begin to denounce the 'Yahoos of the paranormal,' they manage to generate an atmosphere of such intense hysteria ...". Gardner in turn replied quoting his own earlier description of Wilson: "The former boy wonder, tall and handsome in his turtleneck sweater, has now decayed into one of those amiable eccentrics for which the land of Conan Doyle is noted. They prowl comically about the lunatic fringes of science ..."

In a review of a subsequent Gardner work, Paul Stuewe of the Toronto Star called Fads and Fallacies a "hugely enjoyable demolition of pseudo-scientific nonsense". Ed Regis, writing in The New York Times, considered the book to be "the classic put-down of pseudoscience". Fellow skeptic Michael Shermer called the book "the skeptic classic of the past half-century." He noted that the mark of popularity for the book came when John W. Campbell denounced the chapter on dianetics over the radio.

Mark Erickson, author of Science, culture and society: understanding science in the twenty-first century, noted that Gardner's book provided "a flavour of the immense optimism surrounding science in the 1950s" and that his choice of topics were "interesting", but also that his attacks on "osteopathy, chiropractice, and the Bates method for correcting eyesight would raise eyebrows amongst medical practitioners today".

Gardner's own response to criticism is given in his preface:

The first edition of this book prompted many curious letters from irate readers. The most violent letters came from Reichians, furious because the book considered orgonomy alongside such (to them) outlandish cults as dianetics. Dianeticians, of course, felt the same about orgonomy. I heard from homeopaths who were insulted to find themselves in company with such frauds as osteopathy and chiropractic, and one chiropractor in Kentucky “pitied” me because I had turned my spine on God’s greatest gift to suffering humanity. Several admirers of Dr. Bates favored me with letters so badly typed that I suspect the writers were in urgent need of strong spectacles. Oddly enough, most of these correspondents objected to one chapter only, thinking all the others excellent.

== See also ==
- Survivorship bias
- The Demon-Haunted World
