= Sungazing =

Staring directly at the Sun

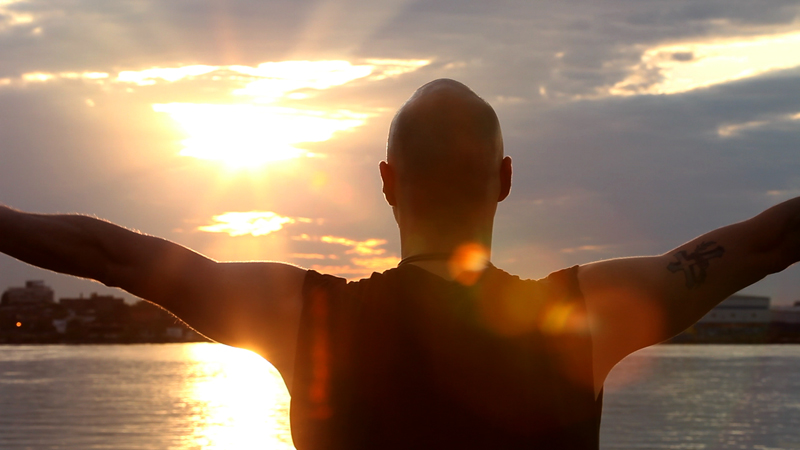
A man sungazing

Sungazing is the unsafe and pseudoscientific practice of looking directly at the Sun. It is sometimes done as part of a spiritual or religious practice, most often near dawn or dusk. The human eye is very sensitive, and exposure to direct sunlight can lead to solar retinopathy, pterygium, cataracts, and blindness. Studies have shown that even when viewing a solar eclipse the eye can still be exposed to harmful levels of ultraviolet radiation.

== Damage ==
The damage to eyes from ultraviolet radiation can be serious and permanent due to damage to the retina. Wearing sunglasses can prevent some harm, depending on the UV rating. People who have had cataract surgery, received photodynamic therapy, or are under the effects of photosensitizing medications have an increased risk of eye damage due to sungazing. During a solar eclipse, the risk of damage is especially high. When looking at the eclipsed Sun directly, the eyes dilate due to the reduced visible light. Without proper protection, this leads to a larger area for the Sun's UV rays to penetrate and do damage. This can be hard to prevent as the retina has no pain receptors.

== Movements ==
Referred to as sunning by William Horatio Bates as one of a series of exercises included in his Bates method, it became a popular form of alternative therapy in the early 20th century. His methods were widely debated at the time but ultimately discredited for lack of scientific rigor. The British Medical Journal reported in 1967 that "Bates (1920) advocated prolonged sun-gazing as the treatment of myopia, with disastrous results".

== See also ==
- Joseph Plateau
