= Bates method =

Ineffective alternative eyesight improvement therapy

Alternative medicine
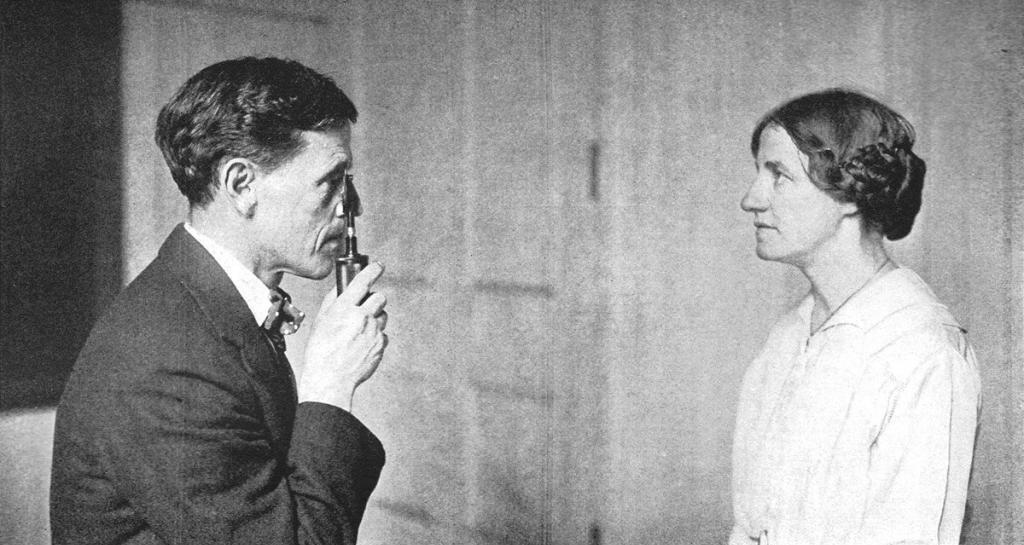
- William Bates and his assistant
- Claims: The need for eyeglasses can be reversed by relaxation.
- Related fields: Ophthalmology, optometry
- Year proposed: 1891
- Original proponents: William Horatio Bates; Bernarr Macfadden

The Bates method is an ineffective and potentially dangerous alternative therapy aimed at improving eyesight. Eye-care physician William Horatio Bates (1860–1931) held the erroneous belief that the extraocular muscles produced changes in focus and that "mental strain" caused abnormal action of these muscles; hence he believed that relieving such "strain" would cure defective vision. In 1952, optometry professor Elwin Marg wrote of Bates, "Most of his claims and almost all of his theories have been considered false by practically all visual scientists."

No type of training has been shown to change the refractive power of the eye. Moreover, certain aspects of the Bates method can put its followers at risk: They may damage their eyes through overexposure to sunlight, not wear their corrective lenses when they need them (e.g., while driving), or neglect conventional eye care, possibly allowing serious conditions to develop.

== Early history ==
In 1891, Bates published an article in the New York Medical Journal claiming to have successfully reversed seven cases of nearsightedness, or myopia. In 1911, Bates published an article claiming to have taught myopic schoolchildren how to correctly focus in the distance. He recommended that schools post a Snellen chart in each classroom and encourage students to read it daily.

In 1917, Bates teamed up with "'physical culture' faddist" Bernarr Macfadden on a "New Course of Eye Training" which was heavily advertised in the Physical Culture magazine. Bates' name was later dropped from the advertising, but Macfadden continued to market this correspondence course, which was renamed "Strengthening the Eyes". This course was criticized by the American Medical Association's Bureau of Investigation as dangerous quackery. In July 1919, Bates began publishing Better Eyesight, "A Monthly Magazine Devoted to the Prevention and Cure of Imperfect Sight Without Glasses". This was also criticized "as it were the product of a psychopathic ward".

In 1920, Bates self-published a book, The Cure of Imperfect Sight by Treatment Without Glasses (or Perfect Sight Without Glasses). In 1926, articles by his assistant Emily Lierman were re-printed in a book titled Stories From the Clinic; some of these stories claimed that such methods had cured glaucoma and cataracts as well as refractive errors. In 1929, the Federal Trade Commission lodged a complaint against Bates for advertising "falsely or misleadingly".

== Underlying concepts ==
=== Accommodation ===
Accommodation is the process by which the vertebrate eye adjusts optical power to maintain focus on the retina while the eye's gaze shifts to a point either closer or farther away. The long-standing medical consensus is that this is accomplished by action of the ciliary muscle, a muscle within the eye, which adjusts the curvature of the eye's crystalline lens. This explanation is based in the observed effect of atropine temporarily preventing accommodation when applied to the ciliary muscle, as well as images reflected on the crystalline lens becoming smaller as the eye shifts focus to a closer point, indicating a change in the lens' shape. Bates rejected this explanation, and in his 1920 book presented photographs that he said showed that the image remained the same size even as the eye shifted focus, concluding from this that the lens was not a factor in accommodation. However, optometrist Philip Pollack in a 1956 work characterized these photographs as "so blurred that it is impossible to tell whether one image is larger than the other", in contrast to later photographs that clearly showed a change in the size of the reflected images, just as had been observed since the late 19th century.

Bates adhered to a different explanation of accommodation that had already been generally disregarded by the medical community of his time. Bates' model had the muscles surrounding the eyeball controlling its focus. In addition to their known function of turning the eye, Bates maintained, they also affect its shape, elongating the eyeball to focus at the near-point or shortening it to focus at a distance. Science author John Grant writes that many animals, such as fishes, accommodate by elongation of the eyeball, "it's just that humans aren't one of those animals."

Laboratory tests have shown that the human eyeball is far too rigid to spontaneously change shape to a degree that would be necessary to accomplish what Bates described. Exceedingly small changes in axial length of the eyeball (18.6–19.2 μm) are caused by the action of the ciliary muscle during accommodation. However, these changes are far too small to account for the necessary changes in focus, producing changes of only −0.036 dioptres.

=== Causes of sight problems ===
Medical professionals characterize refractive errors as consequences of the eye's shape and other basic anatomy, which no evidence shows any exercise can alter. Bates, however, believed that these conditions are caused by tension of the muscles surrounding the eyeball, which he believed prevents the eyeball from sufficiently changing shape (per his explanation of accommodation) when gaze is shifted nearer or farther. Bates characterized this supposed muscular tension as the consequence of a "mental strain" to see, the relief of which he claimed would instantly improve sight. He also linked disturbances in the circulation of blood, which he said is "very largely influenced by thought", not only to refractive errors, but also to double vision, crossed-eye, lazy eye, and to more serious eye conditions such as cataracts and glaucoma. His therapies were based on these assumptions.

Bates felt that corrective lenses, which he characterized as "eye crutches", are an impediment to curing poor vision. In his view, "strain" would increase as the eyes adjust to the correction in front of them. He thus recommended that glasses be discarded by anyone applying his method.

== Treatments ==
In his writings, Bates discussed several techniques that he claimed helped patients to improve their sight. These techniques were all supposed to relieve "strain" to which Bates attributed sight problems.

=== Palming ===
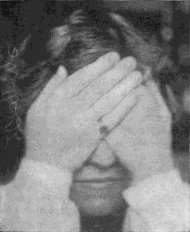
Photo of someone "palming", from Perfect Sight Without Glasses

Bates suggested closing the eyes for minutes at a time to help bring about relaxation. He asserted that the relaxation could be deepened in most cases by "palming", or covering the closed eyes with the palms of the hands, without putting pressure on the eyeballs. If the covered eyes did not strain, he said, they would see "a field so black that it is impossible to remember, imagine, or see anything blacker", since light was excluded by the palms. However, he reported that some of his patients experienced "illusions of lights and colors" sometimes amounting to "kaleidoscopic appearances" as they "palmed", occurrences he attributed to his ubiquitous "strain" and that he claimed disappeared when one truly relaxed. This phenomenon, however, was almost certainly caused by Eigengrau or "dark light". In fact, even in conditions of perfect darkness, as inside a cave, neurons at every level of the visual system produce random background activity that is interpreted by the brain as patterns of light and color.

If while palming one ends up applying pressure to the eyes, this may increase the risk of glaucoma.

=== Visualization ===
Bates placed importance on mental images, as he felt relaxation was the key to clarity of imagination as well as of actual sight. He claimed that one's poise could be gauged by the visual memory of black; that the darker it appeared in the mind, and the smaller the area of black that could be imagined, the more relaxed one was at the moment. He recommended that patients think of the top letter from an eye chart and then visualize progressively smaller black letters, and eventually a period or comma. He cautioned against "concentrating" on such images, as he regarded an attempt to "think of one thing only" as a strain.

While Bates preferred to have patients imagine something black, he also reported that some found objects of other colors easiest to visualize, thus were benefited most by remembering those, because, he asserted, "the memory can never be perfect unless it is easy." Skeptics reason that the only benefit to eyesight gained from such techniques is itself imagined, and point out that familiar objects, including letters on an eye chart, can be recognized even when they appear less than clear.

=== Movement ===
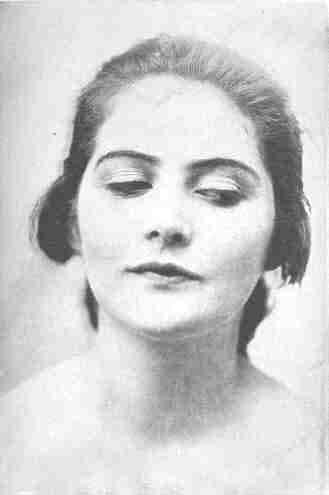
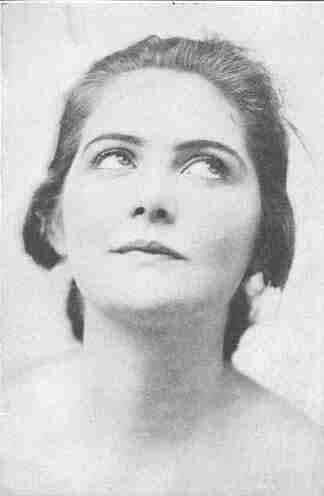
Eye movement exercises

Bates thought that the manner of eye movement affected the sight. He suggested "shifting", or moving the eyes back and forth to get an illusion of objects "swinging" in the opposite direction. He believed that the smaller the area over which the "swing" was experienced, the greater was the benefit to sight. He combined this with visualization, advocating that patients close their eyes and imagine movement of objects. By alternating actual and mental shifting over an image, Bates wrote, many patients were quickly able to shorten the "shift" to a point where they could "conceive and swing a letter the size of a period in a newspaper".

Perhaps finding Bates' concepts of "shifting" and "swinging" too complicated, Bernarr Macfadden suggested simply moving the eyes up and down, from side to side, and shifting one's gaze between a near-point and a far-point.

=== Sunning ===
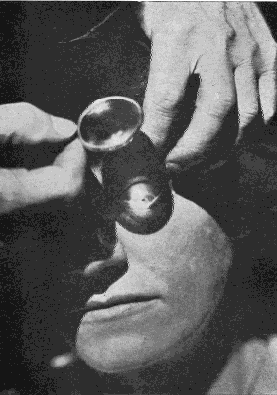
A burning glass being used to focus sunlight on someone's eye, from Perfect Sight Without Glasses

Bates advocated sungazing, characterizing ill effects as "always temporary". This is at odds with the well-known risk of eye damage that can result from direct sunlight observation.

In his magazine, Bates later suggested exposing only the white part of the eyeball to direct sunlight, and only for seconds at a time, after allowing the sun to shine on closed eyelids for a longer period. Posthumous publications of Bates' book omitted mention of the supposed benefits from direct sunlight shining on open eyes. Even on closed eyes, direct sunlight exposure poses a risk of damage to the eyelids, including skin cancer.

== After Bates ==
After Bates died in 1931, his methods of treatment were continued by his widow Emily and other associates. In 1932, Gayelord Hauser published a book endorsing the Bates method but also adding new exercises and recommendations for his own dietary products. Most subsequent proponents did not stand by Bates' explanation of how the eye focused mechanically, but nonetheless maintained that relieving habitual "strain" was the key to improving sight.

=== Margaret Darst Corbett ===
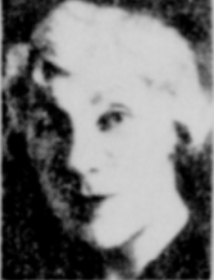
Margaret Darst Corbett

Margaret Darst Corbett first met Bates when she consulted him about her husband's eyesight. She became his pupil, and eventually taught his method at her School of Eye Education in Los Angeles. She was of the stated belief that "the optic nerve is really part of the brain, and vision is nine-tenths mental and one-tenth only physical."

In late 1940, Corbett and her assistant were charged with violations of the Medical Practice Act of California for treating eyes without a license. At the trial, many of her students testified on her behalf, describing in detail how she had enabled them to discard their glasses. One witness testified that he had been almost blind from cataracts, but that after working with Corbett, his vision had improved to such an extent that for the first time he could read for eight hours at a stretch without glasses. Corbett explained in court that she was practicing neither optometry nor ophthalmology and represented herself not as a doctor, but only as an "instructor of eye training". Describing her method, she said, "We turn vision on by teaching the eyes to shift. We want the sense of motion to relieve staring, to end the fixed look. We use light to relax the eyes and to accustom them to the sun."

The trial attracted widespread interest, as did the "not guilty" verdict. The case spurred a bill in the Californian State Legislature that would have then made such vision "education" illegal without an optometric or medical license. After a lively campaign in the media, the bill was rejected.

=== Aldous Huxley ===
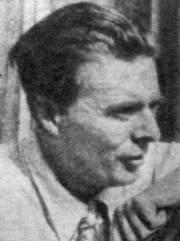
Aldous Huxley

Perhaps the most famous proponent of the Bates method was the British writer Aldous Huxley. At the age of 16, Huxley had an attack of keratitis, which, after an 18-month period of near-blindness, left him with one eye just capable of light perception and the other with an unaided Snellen fraction of 10/200. This was mainly due to opacities in both corneas, complicated by hyperopia and astigmatism. He was able to read only if he wore thick glasses and dilated his better pupil with atropine, to allow that eye to see around an opacity in the center of the cornea.

In 1939, at the age of 45 and with eyesight that continued to deteriorate, he happened to hear of the Bates method and sought the help of Margaret Corbett, who gave him regular lessons. Three years later, he wrote The Art of Seeing, in which he related: "Within a couple of months, I was reading without spectacles, and what was better still, without strain and fatigue.... At the present time, my vision, though very far from normal, is about twice as good as it used to be when I wore spectacles." Describing the process, Huxley wrote, "Vision is not won by making an effort to get it: it comes to those who have learned to put their minds and eyes into a state of alert passivity, of dynamic relaxation." He expressed indifference regarding the veracity of Bates' explanation of how the eye focuses, stating, "my concern is not with the anatomical mechanism of accommodation, but with the art of seeing."

His case generated wide publicity, as well as scrutiny. Ophthalmologist Walter B. Lancaster, for example, suggested in 1944 that Huxley had "learned how to use what he has to better advantage" by training the "cerebral part of seeing", rather than actually improving the quality of the image on the retina.

In 1952, 10 years after writing The Art of Seeing, Huxley spoke at a Hollywood banquet, wearing no glasses, and according to Bennett Cerf, apparently reading his paper from the lectern without difficulty. In Cerf's words:

Then suddenly he faltered—and the disturbing truth became obvious. He wasn't reading his address at all. He had learned it by heart. To refresh his memory, he brought the paper closer and closer to his eyes. When it was only an inch or so away, he still couldn't read it, and had to fish for a magnifying glass in his pocket to make the typing visible to him. It was an agonizing moment.

In response to this, Huxley wrote, "I often do use magnifying glasses where conditions of light are bad, and have never claimed to be able to read except under very good conditions." This underscored that he had not regained anything close to normal vision, and in fact never claimed that he had.

=== Modern variants ===
"Natural vision correction" or "natural vision improvement" continues to be marketed by practitioners offering individual instruction, many of whom have no medical or optometric credentials. Most base their approach in the Bates method, though some also integrate vision therapy techniques. Also, many self-help books and programs, which have not been subjected to randomized controlled trials, are aimed at improving eyesight naturally. Purveyors of such approaches argue that they lack the funds to formally test them.

The heavily advertised "See Clearly Method" (of which sales were halted by a court order in November 2006, in response to what were found to be dishonest marketing practices) included "palming" and "light therapy", both adapted from Bates. The creators of the program, however, emphasized that they did not endorse Bates' approach overall.

In his 1992 book The Bates Method, A Complete Guide to Improving Eyesight—Naturally, "Bates method teacher" Peter Mansfield was very critical of eye care professionals for prescribing corrective lenses. The book included accounts of 12 "real cases", but did not report any information about refractive error.

Czech native John Slavicek claims to have created an "eye cure" that improves eyesight in three days, borrowing from ancient yogic eye exercises, visualizations from the Seth Material, and the Bates method. Although he has testimonials from his neighbor and others, several of his students indicate that he has greatly exaggerated their cases. Slavicek's self-published manual, Yoga for the Eyes, was rejected by an ophthalmologist who evaluated it, and evinced no interest from the World Health Organization and St. Erik's Eye Foundation in Sweden, as he had not conducted double-blind tests.

== Possible reasons for claimed improvements ==
Some eye conditions may naturally change for the better with age or in cycles (ophthalmologist Stewart Duke-Elder suggested that this happened with Aldous Huxley's keratitis). A cataract when first setting in sometimes results in much improved eyesight for a short time. One who has been practicing the Bates method will likely credit it for any improvement experienced regardless of the actual cause.

When corrective lenses are removed, vision can adapt to lessen the initial perceived blur, sometimes by more than two lines on an eye chart. This phenomenon is known as blur adaptation. Some studies have suggested that a learned ability to interpret blurred images may also account for perceived improvements in eyesight.

== General research ==
In 2004 the American Academy of Ophthalmology (AAO) published a review of various research regarding "visual training", which consisted of "eye exercises, muscle relaxation techniques, biofeedback, eye patches, or eye massages", "alone or in combinations". No evidence was found that such techniques could objectively benefit eyesight, though some studies noted changes, both positive and negative, in the visual acuity of nearsighted subjects as measured by a Snellen chart. In some cases noted improvements were maintained at subsequent follow-ups. However, these results were not seen as actual reversals of nearsightedness, and were attributed instead to factors such as "improvements in interpreting blurred images, changes in mood or motivation, creation of an artificial contact lens by tear film changes, or a pinhole effect from miosis of the pupil."

In 2005 the Ophthalmology Department of New Zealand's Christchurch Hospital published a review of forty-three studies regarding the use of eye exercises. They found that "As yet there is no clear scientific evidence published in the mainstream literature supporting the use of eye exercises" to improve visual acuity, and concluded that "their use therefore remains controversial."

== General criticisms ==
=== Dead-end ===
A frequent criticism of the Bates method is that it has remained relatively obscure, which is seen as proof that it is not truly effective. Writer Alan M. MacRobert concluded in a 1979 article that the "most telling argument against the Bates system" and other alternative therapies was that they "bore no fruit". In regards to the Bates method, he reasoned that "If palming, shifting, and swinging could really cure poor eyesight, glasses would be as obsolete by now as horse-drawn carriages."

Philosopher Frank J. Leavitt has argued that the method Bates described would be difficult to test scientifically due to his emphasis on relaxation and visualization. Leavitt asked, "How can we tell whether someone has relaxed or imagined something, or just thinks that he or she has imagined it?" Regarding the possibility of a placebo trial, Leavitt commented, "I cannot conceive of how we could put someone in a situation where he thinks he has imagined something while we know that he has not."

=== Corrective lenses and safety ===
Discarding one's corrective lenses, as Bates recommended, or wearing lenses weaker than one's prescribed correction, as some Bates method advocates suggest, poses a potential safety hazard in certain situations, especially when one is operating a motor vehicle. James Randi related that his father, shortly after discarding glasses for this reason, wrecked his car. Bates method teachers often caution that when driving, one should wear the correction legally required.

=== Avoidance of conventional treatment ===
A follower of the Bates method may neglect urgently needed medical treatment for a condition such as glaucoma, which can lead to blindness. Also, children with vision problems may require early attention by a professional in order to successfully prevent lazy eye. Such treatment may include exercises, but which are different from those associated with the Bates method, and parents who subscribe to Bates' ideas may delay seeking conventional care until it is too late. It may further be necessary for a child at risk of developing lazy eye to wear the proper correction.

== See also ==
- List of topics characterized as pseudoscience
- Iridology
- Pinhole glasses
- Tibetan eye chart
