= See Clearly Method =

Pseudoscience eye exercise program

The See Clearly Method was an eye-exercise program that was marketed as an alternative to the use of glasses, contact lenses, and eye surgery to improve vision. Sales were halted by legal action in 2006. The method is not supported by basic science, and no research studies were conducted prior to marketing. The program is based in part on the Bates method, an alternative therapy devised in the early 20th century, which lacks clinical evidence to support the claim that it can improve eyesight.

== History ==
The See Clearly Method was created by four individuals who called themselves the "American Vision Institute": optometrist David W. Muris, optometrist Merrill J. Allen, psychologist Francis A. Young, and nuclear chemist Steven Beresford. In 1996, they authored a book titled Improve Your Vision Without Glasses or Contact Lenses: A New Program of Therapeutic Eye Exercises, on which the later system was based. When Fairfield, Iowa, businessman Cliff Rose saw the book, he asked that the authors develop the program. Along with attorney David Sykes, Rose created Vision Improvement Technologies, which owned and marketed the See Clearly Method, which was heavily advertised on radio and television from 2001 to 2006, with the endorsement of actress Mariette Hartley.

The See Clearly Method and related approaches have been described as "amply critiqued and debunked." A 2005 Ohio State University study found no significant results in the application of the method.

Both the Journal of the American Optometric Association and the Journal of Behavioral Optometry declined to publish a study by the American Vision Institute purportedly demonstrating the efficacy of the method. The AVI then self-published the paper on their website.

== Techniques ==
Some of the program's techniques were adapted from the Bates method, a collection of techniques developed by William Bates in the early 20th century. These techniques were based on Bates' own unorthodox theories, which have been consistently rejected by the scientific and medical community. Still, no evidence suggests that the Bates method, in whole or in part, is effective.

Some of the See Clearly Method's techniques are:

- "Tromboning" involved holding a small object at varying distances from one's eyes, inhaling as it was moved in and exhaling as it was moved out. The program's manual stated, "Tromboning exercises the focusing mechanism, improves control of the extraocular muscles, and stimulates the flow of nutrients inside the eyes".
- The Scanning Chart exercise involved moving a chart just out of focus, then jumping from dot to dot in time with the music on the program's exercise video.
- The program recommended Acupressure, in essence a massage for muscles surrounding the eye.
- "Blur reading" entailed turning a magazine upside-down at a distance from which the words were unclear, selecting a word and running one's gaze around it, and then around any letters one could recognize.
- Personal affirmations such as "I am seeing better each day" or "I can see without my glasses" were suggested.
- Light therapy, a variation of Bates's "sunning", involved sitting with one's eyes closed and the face six inches from an unshaded 150-watt bulb, just far enough to make the eyes "pleasantly warm but not too hot", according to the manual.
- "Palming", another technique adapted from Bates, involved closing the eyes and resting them against the palms.
- "Hydrotherapy", involved alternately placing hot and cold water-soaked towels over the eyes.

The See Clearly Method kit was sold at $350.

== Legal action ==
Wisconsin's Consumer Protection had issued a warning that half of the kit buyers in the State had returned it.

Iowa State Attorney General Tom Miller filed a consumer fraud lawsuit against Vision Improvement Technologies, the promoter of the See Clearly Method, in 2005. The lawsuit alleged that "Vision Improvement Technologies uses a combination of misleading and unfair marketing tactics to sell their kits, including exaggerated claims of effectiveness, false implications of scientific validity, and misleading consumer testimonials in advertising." In February 2006 an Iowa court issued a temporary injunction restricting certain aspects of the company's marketing. A November 2, 2006, press release from the Iowa Attorney General's office announced a consent decree with Vision Improvement under which the company will halt sales, offer restitution to customers, clear customers' credit records of any filings related to See Clearly purchases, and halt operations as of December 2006.

On December 18, 2006, the company's web site stated, "As of November 1, 2006 The See Clearly Method is no longer available for sale." In response to a 2007 complaint by the California Attorney General's office concerning David Muris' involvement with the See Clearly Method, Muris was placed on probation for five years in 2008 by the state Board of Optometry.

== See also ==
- Quackery
- Margaret Darst Corbett

== Bibliography ==
- Beresford, Steven M.; Muris, David W.; Allen, Merril J.; Young, Francis A. (1996). Improve Your Vision Without Glasses or Contact Lenses: A new program of therapeutic eye exercise. Touchstone. ISBN 978-0684814384.
