= Blackstrap =

Blackstrap may refer to:

- Blackstrap molasses, a by-product of sugar processing
- Black Strap Molasses (song)
- Blackstrap (electoral district), a federal electoral district in Saskatchewan, Canada
- Blackstrap Lake, a man-made lake in Saskatchewan
- Blackstrap Provincial Park, a park and recreation area in Saskatchewan, Canada
- Blackstrap rum
  - For Blackstrap Ski Hill, a former ski and snowboarding hill, see Blackstrap Provincial Park#Mount Blackstrap
- Blackstrap, a village in Falmouth, Maine
