= The Art of Seeing =

Book by Aldous Huxley

The Art of Seeing: An Adventure in Re-education
- First edition cover
- Author: Aldous Huxley
- Language: English
- Subject: Bates method
- Publisher: Harper & Brothers
- Publication date: 1942
- Publication place: United States
- Media type: Print
- Pages: 142
- ISBN: 0-916870-48-0
- OCLC: 644231

The Art of Seeing: An Adventure in Re-education is a 1942 book by Aldous Huxley, which details his experience with and views on the discredited Bates method, which according to Huxley improved his eyesight.

== Huxley's own sight ==
In the preface to the book, Huxley describes how, at the age of sixteen, he had a violent attack of keratitis punctata which made him almost totally blind for eighteen months, and left him thereafter with severely impaired sight. Strong spectacles were of help, but reading, in particular, was a great strain. In 1939 his ability to read became increasingly degraded, and he sought the help of Margaret Corbett, who taught the Bates method. He found this immensely helpful, and in 1942 wrote “At the present time, my vision, though very far from normal, is about twice as good as it used to be when I wore spectacles, and before I had learned the art of seeing”.

The book is not an autobiography, however. Although his own history fuelled his interest in vision, and there are references in passing throughout the book to his own case, it is written as a general study of vision as he came to understand it.

== His aim in writing ==
Huxley writes that his aim in writing the book was

… to correlate the methods of visual education with the findings of modern psychology and critical philosophy. My purpose in making this correlation is to demonstrate the essential reasonableness of a method, which turns out to be nothing more or less than the practical application to the problems of vision of certain theoretical principles, universally accepted as true.

Unlike many other texts on the Bates method, Huxley's book contains no diagrams of the eye, and very little description of its physiology.

== The supposed incurability of visual defect ==
According to Huxley, the prevailing medical view is that

...the organs of vision are incapable of curing themselves … then the eyes must be totally different in kind from other parts of the body. Given favourable conditions, all other organs tend to free themselves from their defects. Not so the eyes. … it is a waste of time even to try to discover a treatment which will assist nature in its normal task of healing. …

He quotes Matthew Luckiesh, Director of General Electric’s Lighting Research Laboratory who wrote:

Suppose that crippled eyes could be transformed into crippled legs. What a heart-rending parade we would witness on a busy street! Nearly every other person would go limping by. Many would be on crutches and some on wheel chairs.

Huxley goes on to stress that when legs are imperfect, every effort is made to get the patient walking again, and without crutches if at all possible. "Why should it not be possible to do something analogous for defective eyes?"

The orthodox theory is, on the face of it, so implausible, so intrinsically unlikely to be true, that one can only be astonished that it should be so generally and so unquestioningly accepted. … At the present time it is rejected only by those who have personal reasons for knowing it to be untrue … It is therefore no longer possible for me to accept the currently orthodox theory, with its hopelessly pessimistic practical consequences.

== Sensing+Selecting+Perceiving=Seeing ==
He goes on to analyse the whole process of visual perception, using ideas and vocabulary taken from the philosopher C. D. Broad. He sums the analysis up as follows:

- Sensing is not the same as seeing.
- The eyes and the nervous system do the sensing, the mind does the perceiving.
- The faculty of perceiving is related to the individual’s accumulated experiences, in other words, to memory.
- Clear seeing is the product of accurate sensing and correct perceiving.
- Any improvement in the power of perceiving tends to be accompanied by an improvement in the power of sensing and of the product of sensing and perceiving which is seeing.

== Variability ==
The most characteristic fact about the functioning of the total organism, or any part of the organism, is that it is not constant, but highly variable. … People with unimpaired eyes and good habits of using them possess, so to speak, a wide margin of visual safety. Even when their seeing organs are functioning badly, they still see well enough for most practical purposes. Consequently they are not so acutely conscious of variations in visual functioning as are those with bad seeing habits and impaired eyes. These last have little or no margin of safety; consequently any diminution in seeing power produces noticeable and often distressing results.

Huxley goes on to discuss the factors which bring about variation – general health or lack of it, tiredness, boredom, emotional states. But whereas these are in general transitory, glasses, if worn, are to a fixed prescription.

It will thus be seen that the wearing of spectacles confines the eyes to a state of rigid and unvarying structural immobility. In this respect artificial lenses resemble, not the crutches to which Dr. Luckiesh has compared them, but splints, iron braces and plaster casts.

== Relaxation ==
The majority of the book is devoted to the specific techniques of the Bates method, all designed to bring about "relaxation". Huxley distinguishes "passive relaxation", a state of complete repose, from "dynamic relaxation", characterized as "that state of the body and mind which is associated with normal and natural functioning".

Mal-functioning and strain tend to appear whenever the conscious "I" interferes with instinctively acquired habits of proper use, either by trying too hard to do well, or by feeling unduly anxious about possible mistakes.. In the building up of any psycho-physical skill the conscious "I" must give orders, but not too many orders … As one practises the techniques of visual education, one discovers the extent to which this same conscious "I" can interfere with the processes of seeing even when no distressing emotions are present. And it interferes, we discover, in exactly the same way as it interferes with the process of playing tennis, for example, or singing – by being too anxious to achieve the desired end. But in seeing, as in all other psycho-physical skills, the anxious effort to do well defeats its own object; for this anxiety produces psychological and physiological strains, and strain is incompatible with the proper means for achieving our end, namely normal and natural functioning.

Right at the end of the book there is a mention of F. M. Alexander, whose Alexander technique for posture is perhaps analogous to that of Bates for eyes.

== Criticism of the book ==
The established ophthalmological and optometric professions have not been convinced. For example, Stewart Duke-Elder wrote

Whatever be the value of the exercises, it is quite unintelligent of Huxley to have confused their advocacy with so many misstatements regarding known scientific facts. It has been shown that the hypothesis upon which these methods of treatment are based is wrong; but Huxley, while admitting he is ignorant of the matter and unqualified to speak, contends that this is of no importance because the method works in practice and gives good results: it comes into the category of "art" not of "science." The argument is perfectly allowable, for in other spheres than medicine empirical methods have often produced effective results the rationale of which may be mysterious. The most stupid feature about his book, however, is that he insists throughout on the physiological mechanism whereby these exercises are supposed to work. It would at least have been logical if he had continued to allow the reader to assume that he was speaking in ignorance of anything except results. . . .

There would appear to be no doubt that these exercises have done Aldous Huxley himself a great deal of good. Every ophthalmologist knows that they have made quite a number of people with a similar functional affliction happy. And every ophthalmologist equally knows that his consulting-room has long been haunted by people whom they have not helped at all.

He concluded by saying,

For the simple neurotic who has abundance of time to play with, Huxley's antics of palming, shifting, flashing, and the rest are probably as good treatment as any other system of Yogi or Coué-ism. To these the book may be of value. It is hardly possible that it will impress anyone endowed with common sense and a critical faculty. It may be dangerous in the hands of the impressionable who happen to suffer from glaucoma or detachment of the retina. . .

Martin Gardner described The Art of Seeing as "a book destined to rank beside Bishop Berkeley’s famous treatise on the medicinal properties of ‘tar-water’."

New York optometrist Philip Pollack commented:

Huxley sounds in his book like Bates out of Oxford with a major in psychology and metaphysics. Bates wrote of relaxation but Huxley brings in transcendentalism. Tension and poor vision are caused by the refusal of the individual ego to surrender to Nature.
