= Margaret Corbett =

Margaret Corbett may refer to:

- Margaret Darst Corbett, an American who taught the Bates method
- Misses Corbett, pseudonym of Scottish author
