= Gayelord Hauser =

American nutritionist and writer (1895–1984)

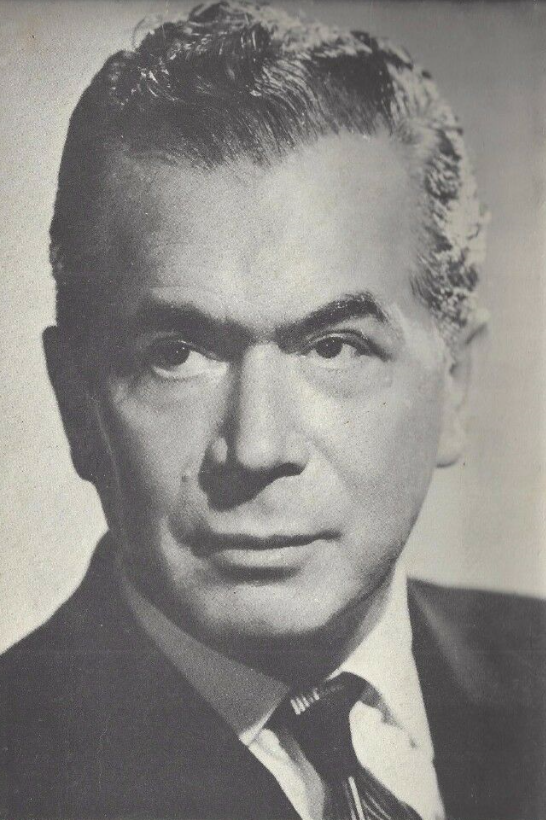
- Hauser in 1930
- Born: Helmut Eugen Benjamin Gellert Hauser; May 17, 1895; Tübingen, Germany
- Died: December 26, 1984 (aged 89); North Hollywood, California
- Occupations: Naturopath, health and nutrition author

Benjamin Gayelord Hauser (May 17, 1895 – December 26, 1984), popularly known as Gayelord Hauser, was an American nutritionist and self-help writer, who promoted the 'natural way of eating' during the mid-20th century. He promoted foods rich in B vitamins and discouraged consumption of sugar and white flour. He rose to fame as a self-help author, popular on the lecture and social circuits, and was nutritional advisor to many celebrities.

Hauser was supported by many film stars but was often in conflict with the medical community. He promised people they could add years to their life by eating five "wonder foods": blackstrap molasses, brewer's yeast, skimmed milk, wheat germ and yogurt. He was criticized as a "food faddist" and his dieting ideas were described by medical doctors as pseudoscientific and quackery.

== Background and education ==
Gayelord Hauser was born Helmut Eugen Benjamin Gellert Hauser on 17 May 1895 in Tübingen, Germany, to Christian Hauser, a schoolmaster, and Agate Rothe. At the age of sixteen, young Helmut joined his older brother, the Reverend Otto Hauser, a pastor, in Chicago, Illinois; shortly thereafter they moved to Milwaukee. Young Hauser sailed to America as a steerage passenger on the SS George Washington, and underwent immigrant inspection at Ellis Island on 14 August 1911.

Not long after settling in the US, Hauser was stricken with tuberculosis of the hip which, before the development of antibiotics in the 1930s, was almost always fatal. After several operations proved fruitless, his case was declared hopeless and Hauser consulted a naturopath, Dr. Benedict Lust. Lust recommended a regimen of warm baths, clay packs, and herbal remedies. Hauser's condition subsequently improved and he soon followed Lust's recommendation to seek further treatment in Switzerland to see if the new "food science" (Nahrungswissen) had anything to offer him. A monk, Brother Maier, put him on a strict diet of salads, fruit juices, vegetable broths, and herbs. Within weeks the tubercular hip went into remission, permanently cured.

Hauser then embarked upon studies of "food science" in order to become an expert and spread a message about "the power of food." He studied in Vienna, Zurich, Dresden, and Copenhagen. He now returned to the US, changed his name, and set up office in Chicago. He toured the Midwest touting the value of his five "wonder foods": yogurt, brewers yeast, powdered skim milk, wheat germ, and especially blackstrap molasses. Hauser believed in the healthful effects of "whole foods" and urged people to avoid too much fat, excessive sugar, and excessive consumption of meat. He urged people to "enrich" their milk and food with powdered skim milk, blackstrap molasses, and brewer's yeast. He provided recipes for whole wheat muffins, breads, drinks, and yogurt. When enriched white breads were introduced in the 1950s, Hauser denounced them as "devitalized" because of the value of the removed wheat germ.

Hauser continued his studies in the US, receiving degrees in naturopathy and chiropractic from several American institutions. In 1925 Hauser joined his brother-in-law, Sebastian Gysin, in the Milwaukee firm of Modern Products, which already manufactured an herbal laxative developed by Gysin, called Swiss Kriss. Hauser helped to market a series of food products produced by Modern Products. Modern Products continues to this day, and Hauser's line of seasonings and broths are found in most health food stores. Another company, Gayelord Hauser of France, markets an even more extensive line of food products and publications in that country.

In 1927, Hauser moved to Hollywood, California, where his "natty good looks and brash, exuberant approach" soon made him popular among movie makers. First Adele Astaire, and later Marlene Dietrich, Paulette Goddard, Gloria Swanson, and, most famously, Greta Garbo all sought his advice and guidance. Also among those seeking his counsel in later years were Queen Alexandra of Yugoslavia, Baron Philippe de Rothschild, Grace Kelly, Ingrid Bergman, Jeanne Moreau, and the Duchess of Windsor.

A tireless promoter, Hauser began his prolific writing career in 1930 with Harmonized Food Selection, with the Famous Hauser Body-Building System, and continued through his final revision of Gaylord Hauser's New Treasury of Secrets in 1974. His books were translated into twelve languages, he had a popular column in the Hearst newspapers, and his most famous book, Look Younger; Live Longer (partly ghost-written by Frances Warfield Hackett), was condensed in Reader's Digest.

Hauser was friends with Greta Garbo until the end of his life and they may have been romantically involved. Garbo was also friends with Frey Brown, a promising young actor who had left his career in the early 1940s to be Hauser's male domestic partner. Garbo and her close friend Mercedes de Acosta would spend time at Hauser and Brown's houses in Los Angeles, Palm Springs, and Italy.

After purchasing Casa Cuseni, a grand villa in Taormina, Sicily in 1950, where he wrote his most famous book, Look Younger; Live Longer, he spent much of his time there with Frey Brown. After Brown's death in 1979, Hauser sold the villa and returned full-time to Hollywood, where he remained in vigorous good health until shortly before his death on 26 December 1984 from complications of pneumonia.

== Controversy and legacy ==
Making health recommendations despite not being a medical doctor, Hauser was criticized almost from the start by the recognized medical authorities, especially the AMA, as well as sugar and flour lobbies. In 1951 the Food and Drug Administration seized copies of Look Younger; Live Longer, which promised to add five "youthful years" to your life, on the grounds that it was promoting the sale of one brand of blackstrap molasses.

In 1963, Louis Lasagna commented that Hauser's writings were a "mélange of good sense, questionable nutritional advice, name-dropping, continental charm, and coy chattiness." As late as 1967, Hauser was dismissed as a crank and compared with such obvious charlatans as Dudley J. LeBlanc, promoter of the cure-all Hadacol.

Some medical health experts have been critical; for example it has been noted that Hauser was a promoter of the Bates method, which is widely regarded as quackery.

However, others consider him to be ahead of his time and a founder of the natural food movement.

== Publications ==
- Types and Temperaments with a Key to Foods (1930)
- Food Science and Health (1930)
- New Health Cookery (1930)
- Child Feeding: Written for Mothers (1932)
- Keener Vision Without Glasses (1932)
- Here's How to Be Healthy (1934)
- Eat and Grow Beautiful (1936)
- Dictionary Of Foods (1939)
- A Training Course In Health-Eating (1940)
- Diet Does It (1944)
- Better Eyes Without Glasses (1944)
- The Gayelord Hauser Cook Book (1946)
- Look Younger, Live Longer (1950)
- Gayelord Hauser's New Treasury of Secrets (1951)
- Be Happier, Be Healthier (1952)
- Diet Does It: Incorporating the Gayelord Hauser Cook Book (1952)
- Gayelord Hauser's New Guide to Intelligent Reducing (1955)
- Mirror, Mirror on the Wall: Invitation to Beauty (1961)
- Gayelord Hauser's Treasury of Secrets (1963)

== Trivia ==
- Hauser's doctorates are honorary degrees from the University Philtechnique in Brussels, Belgium and the Argentina School of Nutrition in Buenos Aires.
- A statue stands in his honor in Kyoto, Japan.
- His diet was the topic of a popular 1951 novelty song, Black Strap Molasses, recorded by movie stars Groucho Marx, Jimmy Durante, Jane Wyman, and Danny Kaye.
- He is referenced in the song "Monotonous" by Eartha Kitt with the line "Gayelord Hauser sends me vitamin D."
- Stan Freberg mentions Hauser in a song entitled 'Widescreen Mama Blues.'
- In the episode "Travnicek in der Apotheke" of Helmut Qualtinger's Travniceks Gesammelte Werke Travnicek's friend advises him to start a diet based on Hauser's recommendations.
