= Literature and Science =

1963 essay collection by Aldous Huxley

- Cover of the first edition
- Author: Aldous Huxley
- Language: English
- Publisher: Harper & Row
- Publication date: 1963
- Publication place: United States
- Media type: Print (hardcover)
- Pages: 118

Literature and Science, published in September 1963, was Aldous Huxley's last book - he died two months after it was published. In it, he strives to harmonize the scientific and artistic realms. He argues that language is what divides the two realms and makes communication between them difficult. He analyzes the ways in which scientists and fiction writers use language differently to achieve their desired effects. Although he concedes that many differences in language use are inevitable, he urges both camps to seek mutual understanding and appreciation. He directs his argument primarily to fiction writers: "Whether we like it or not,” he tells them, “ours is the Age of Science."

Huxley was the grandson of Thomas Henry Huxley (known as Charles Darwin's "bulldog"), and the grand-nephew of the English poet and essayist Matthew Arnold.

== Scientific Specialization ==
In Literature and Science, Huxley bemoans the disregard for science shown by many if not most literary contemporaries. He dismisses as "literary cowardice" the artists' professed bewilderment in an era when "Science has become an affair of specialists. Incapable any longer of understanding what it is all about, the man of letters, we are told, has no choice but to ignore contemporary science altogether." Huxley takes T.S. Eliot to task for his retreat into "the traditional raw material of English poetical feeling and poetical expression" in Eliot's depictions of nature in The Waste Land. For Eliot and others, Huxley writes, "From their writings you would be hard put to it to infer the simple historical fact that they are the contemporaries of Einstein and Heisenberg, of computers, electron microscopes and the discovery of the molecular basis of heredity...."

== Science As Method ==
Huxley had written decades earlier in Along the Road that "If I could be born again and choose what I should be in my next existence, I should desire to be a man of science...." But in Literature and Science, as scholars have noted, the later Huxley strongly qualified that earlier aspiration in his pursuit of a grand philosophical synthesis. Milton Birnbaum wrote in 1971 that Huxley "never embraced science as a satisfactory way to gauge the nature of ultimate reality." Yet, Birnbaum adds that Huxley "always favored the methodology of science in the attainment of knowledge...." In Literature and Science, Huxley writes that "The precondition of any fruitful relationship between literature and science is knowledge." For the literary artist, Huxley writes, "a thorough and detailed knowledge of any branch of science is impossible. It is also unnecessary. All that is necessary, so far as the man of letters is concerned, is a general knowledge of science...and an appreciation of the ways in which scientific information and scientific modes of thought are relevant to individual experience...." Included in James Sexton's Selected Letters of Aldous Huxley is a "My dear Tom" letter that Huxley wrote to Eliot: "I venture to recommend" Alfred Korzybski's Science and Sanity, "by far the best thing on 'semantics' and the problem of the relations between words and things, ever produced."

== Hope for the Future ==
Although Huxley remains best known for his early novel Brave New World, scholars agree that the strength in his later writing belongs to his non-fiction prose. George Woodcock writes of "Huxley's diminution as a novelist," noting that "...even if Huxley the artist died after Eyeless in Gaza, Huxley the prose craftsman remained as much alive as ever." Harold H. Watts notes that Huxley's books "...in this final and extended period of his life" are "the work of a man who is meditating on the central problems of many modern men." In Literature and Science, Huxley, acknowledging that "it will be difficult to incorporate the hypotheses of science into harmonious, moving and persuasive works of art," nevertheless expresses the hope that "sooner or later the necessary means will be discovered, the appropriate weapons will be forged, the long-awaited pioneer of genius will turn up and...point out the way."
