= Margaret Darst Corbett =

American vision educator

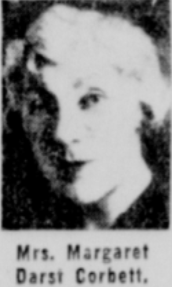
- Born: January 17, 1889; Boston, Massachusetts
- Died: December 5, 1962 (aged 73); Los Angeles, California
- Occupation: writer

Margaret Darst Corbett (January 17, 1889 – December 5, 1962) was an American who promoted the discredited Bates method in an attempt to improve eyesight. She became famous after her prosecution and acquittal on a charge of practicing medicine without a license. Ophthalmologists dismissed Corbett's ideas as quackery.

== Life ==
Corbett was born in Boston, Massachusetts, on January 17, 1889, to Edward Washington Darst and his wife Minnie Ann. Corbett graduated B.S. from the University of California in 1911. She trained teachers at Idaho State Normal School during 1911–1913. During WWI she was a yeoman first class in the United States Navy Reserve. She married Daniel Lithgow Corbett, who died in 1930.

She died in Los Angeles, December 5, 1962.

== Methods and teaching ==
Margaret Corbett met Dr. William H. Bates after consulting him about her husband's eyesight. She became interested in his approach and became his pupil, and eventually taught his methods in her Los Angeles "School of Eye Education".

Her specific techniques included the classic Bates method drills, such as sunning, shifting and swinging. She also, like Bates, placed great emphasis on mental drills, and one's attitude to seeing. Amongst her many pupils was Aldous Huxley, who as a result of his education by Corbett was inspired to write The Art of Seeing.

In 1946, Corbett's had 250 trained teachers working at multiple branches across the United States. The Bates-Corbett Teachers Association was headquartered in El Cajon, California.

== Prosecution and acquittal ==
In late 1940 Corbett and her assistant were charged with violations of the Medical Practice Act of California for treating eyes without a licence. At the trial, many witnesses testified on her behalf. They described in detail how she had improved their sight and had enabled them to discard their glasses. Corbett explained in court that she was practising neither optometry nor ophthalmology and represented herself not as a doctor but only as an "instructor of eye training".

The trial attracted widespread interest, as did the "not guilty" verdict. A bill was introduced into the Californian State Legislature to outlaw such vision education by any practitioner who lacked an optometric or medical license. After a lively campaign in the media, the bill was defeated.

== Criticism ==
Established optometrists and ophthalmologists continue to be unimpressed by Corbett's work. Speaking of her work, amongst others, Philip Pollack wrote

To anyone trained in the science of vision, the ignorance and the sheer absurdity of ideas explained in these books are appalling. The authors by-pass completely the discoveries and the experimental findings of such celebrated scientists and ophthalmologists as Helmholtz, Tscherning, Young, Maddox, Gullstrand, Donders, Duke-Elder, Fincham, etc. Their methods of treatment of defective vision and of diseased eyes are totally without value. ... The ideas of Bates and his disciples, far from being new, are a throwback to medieval habits of thought.

== Works ==
- How to Improve your Eyes. Los Angeles: Willing Publishing Co. 1938.
- Help Yourself to Better Sight. Englewood Cliffs: Prentice-Hall. 1949.
- How to Improve your Sight. London: Faber and Faber. 1954.
