= Tibetan eye chart =

Diagram that allegedly is used to correct visual problems

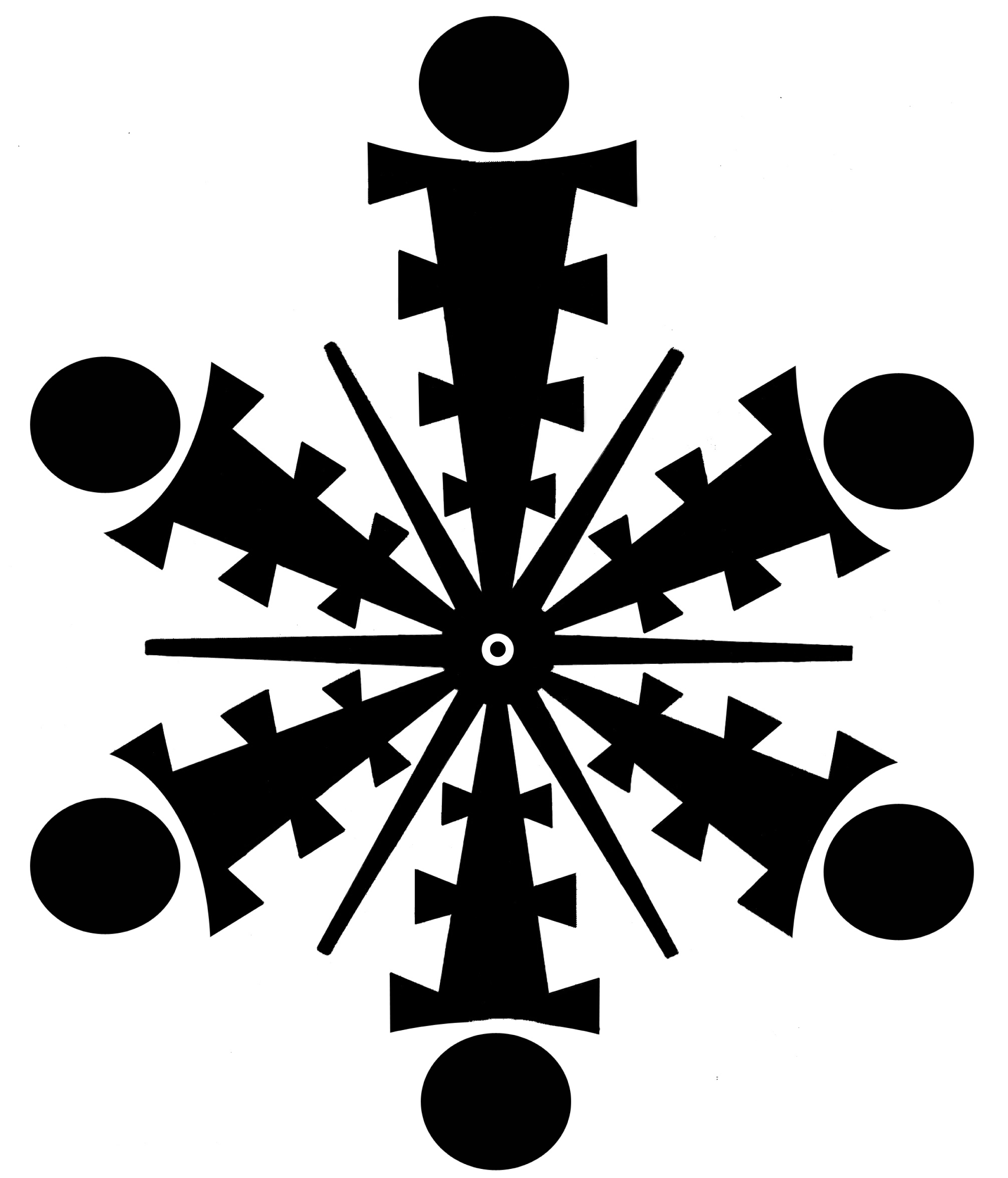
The Tibetan eye chart is said to be invented by Tibetan Lama Monks and has been used for many years.

The Tibetan eye chart is a tool allegedly developed by Tibetan monks. According to some authors, it can be used to train the muscles and nerves of the optical system, correcting visual problems. However, the International Orthoptic Association has found no scientific evidence of the effectiveness of this treatment.

== See also ==
- Eye chart
