= Molasses =

Viscous by-product of the refining of sugarcane, grapes, or sugar beets into sugar

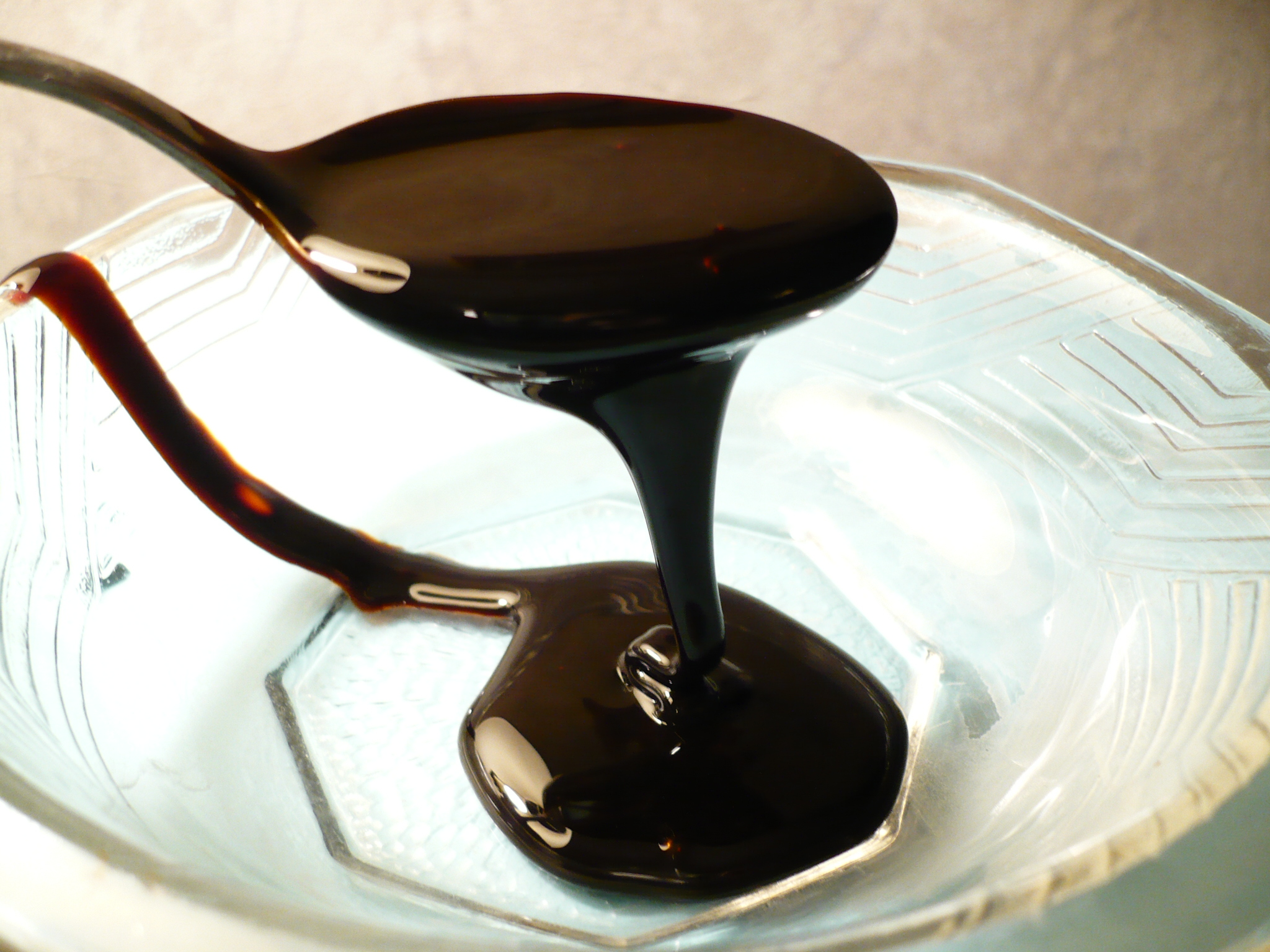
Blackstrap molasses

Molasses (/məˈlæsɪz, moʊ-, -əz/), also called black treacle, is a viscous byproduct principally obtained from the refining of sugarcane or sugar beet juice into sugar. Molasses varies in the amount of sugar, the method of extraction, and the age of the plant. Sugarcane molasses is usually used to sweeten and flavour foods. Molasses is a major constituent of fine commercial brown sugar.

Molasses is rich in vitamins and minerals, including vitamin B6, iron, calcium, magnesium, and potassium. There are different types of molasses depending on the amount of time refined, including first molasses (highest sugar content), second molasses (slightly bitter), and blackstrap molasses (the darkest and most robust in flavor). Molasses was historically popular in the Americas before the 20th century as a sweetener. It is still commonly used in traditional cuisine, such as in Madeira Island's traditional dishes, as well as the American South and the Caribbean.

In addition to culinary uses, molasses has industrial applications, such as in the distillation of rum, as an additive in mortar, and as a soil amendment to promote microbial activity. The unique flavor and nutritional profile of molasses make it a versatile ingredient.

== Production ==
Production of molasses

Per capita production of molasses

== Terminology ==
The word molasses comes from melaço in Portuguese, a derivative of mel 'honey' with Latinate roots. Cognates include Ancient Greek μέλι (méli) 'honey', Latin mel, Spanish melaza 'molasses', Romanian miere or melasă, and French mélasse 'molasses'. The strap in blackstrap may be derived from a Dutch word for syrup, stroop.

== Sugar cane molasses ==
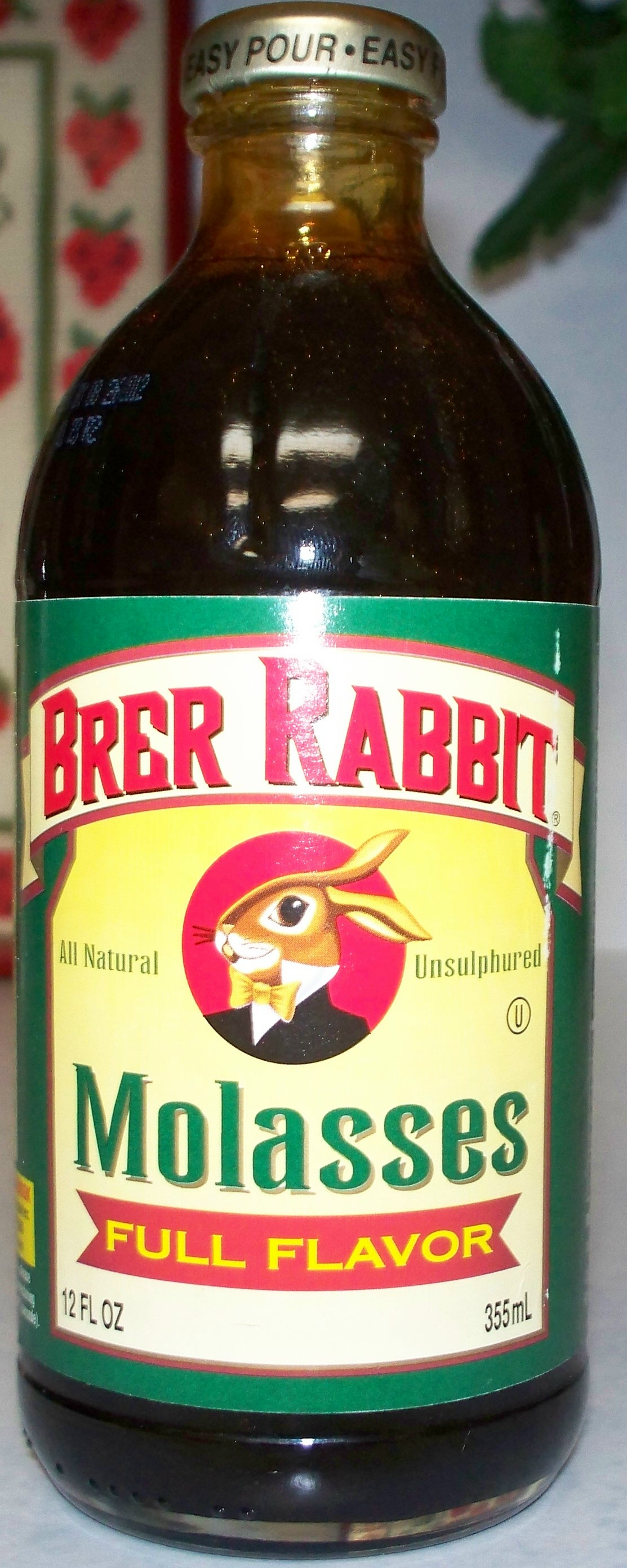
A bottle of molasses

Sugar cane molasses is an ingredient used in baking and cooking. It was popular in the Americas before the 20th century, when it was plentiful and commonly used as a sweetener in foods and an ingredient in brewing beer in the colonies. George Washington had a notebook that contains a molasses beer recipe.

To produce molasses, sugar cane is harvested and stripped of leaves. Its juice is then extracted, usually by cutting, crushing, or mashing. The juice is boiled to produce a concentrate and encourage sugar crystallization. The result of this first boiling is called first syrup ('A' Molasses) and has the highest sugar content. First syrup is usually referred to in the Southern United States as cane syrup rather than molasses. Second molasses ('B' Molasses) is produced by a second boiling and sugar extraction and has a slightly bitter taste.

Boiling the sugar syrup a third time yields dark, viscous blackstrap molasses ('C' Molasses), known for its robust flavour. During this process, the majority of sucrose from the original juice is crystallized and removed. The bitterness of blackstrap molasses is much greater than in the regular form of molasses. It is sometimes used in baking or to produce ethanol, as an ingredient in cattle feed, or in yeast production. Exaggerated health benefits claimed for blackstrap molasses were the theme of the 1951 novelty song Black Strap Molasses, recorded by Groucho Marx, Jimmy Durante, Jane Wyman, and Danny Kaye.

Unlike highly refined sugars, molasses contains significant amounts of vitamin B_{6} and minerals, including calcium, magnesium, iron, and manganese; one tablespoon provides up to 20% of the recommended daily value of each of those nutrients. Blackstrap is also a good source of potassium.

=== Madeira Island ===
On Madeira Island, cane molasses is an important constituent of the traditional cuisine, where it is known as mel-de-cana (Portuguese for "(sugar)cane honey"). Its origin in Madeira dates back to the golden age of sugar production in the archipelago.

== Sugar beet molasses ==
Beet molasses is 50% sugar by dry weight, predominantly sucrose, but contains significant amounts of glucose and fructose. Beet molasses is limited in biotin (vitamin H or B_{7}) for cell growth and therefore may be supplemented with a biotin source. The non-sugar content includes many salts, such as calcium, potassium, magnesium, oxalate, and chloride. It also contains sulfur, betaine, and the trisaccharide raffinose. These result from the concentration of the original plant material or other chemicals in processing and are unpalatable to humans. It is therefore mainly used as an animal feed additive (known as molassed sugar beet feed) or a fermentation feedstock. In animal feed, it provides energy and minerals, increases palatability, and reduces dust.

== Other types ==
Sweet sorghum syrup is colloquially called sorghum molasses in the southern United States.

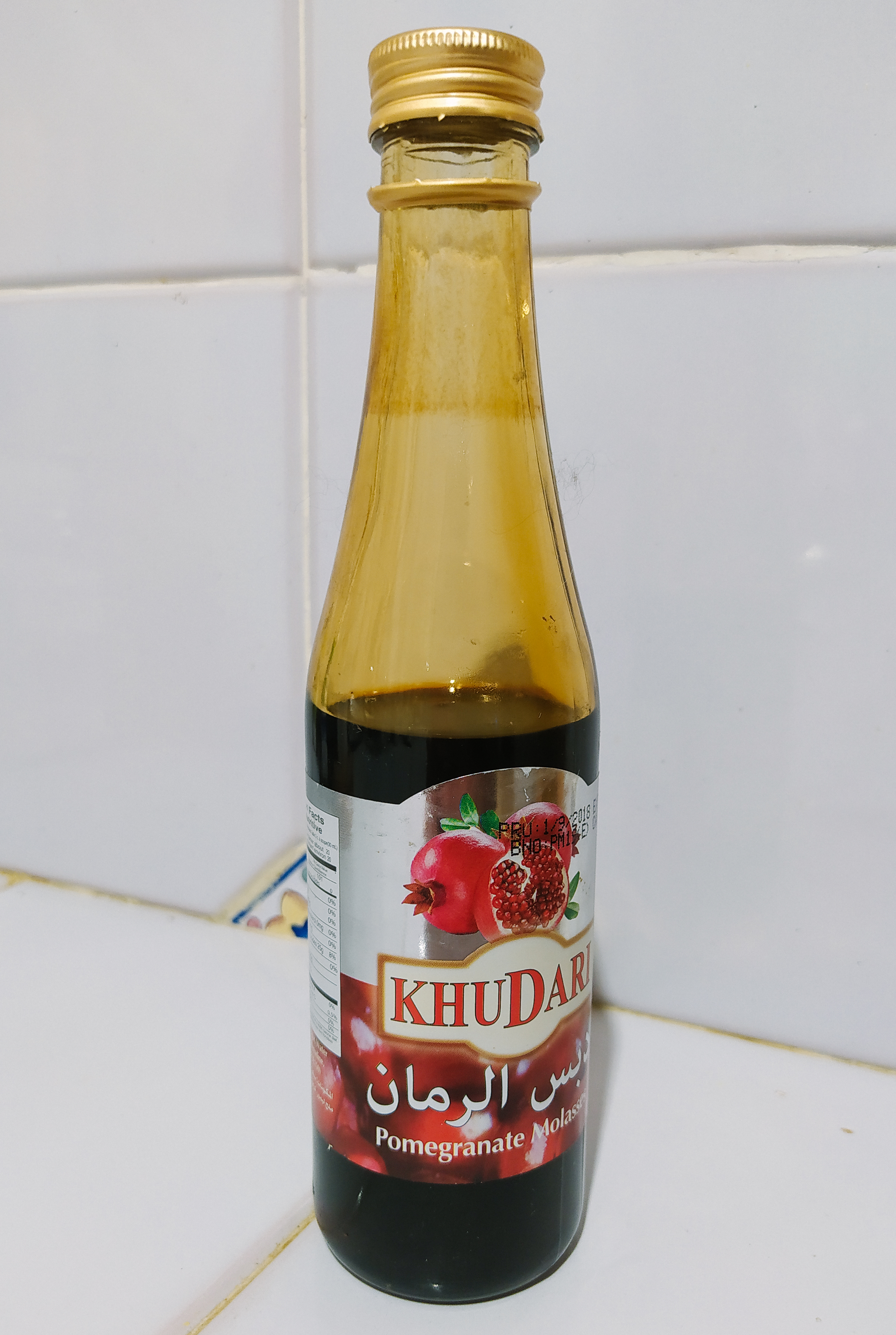
Pomegranate molasses

Pomegranate molasses is a traditional ingredient in Middle Eastern cooking. It is made by simmering a mixture of pomegranate juice, sugar, and lemon juice, and reducing the mixture for about an hour until the consistency of syrup is achieved.

== Unsulfured molasses ==
Many types of molasses on the market are branded unsulfured. In the past, many foods, including molasses, were treated with a sulfur dioxide preservative, helping to kill off moulds and bacteria. Sulfur dioxide is also used as a bleaching agent to help lighten the colour of molasses. Most brands have abandoned the use of sulfur dioxide in molasses, because untreated molasses already has a stable shelf life. Poor flavour and the trace toxicity of low doses of sulfur dioxide also led to its removal.

== Cooking ==
During cooking, the presence of molasses increases the hygroscopicity of surrounding ingredients, and through the Maillard reaction, it often turns brown. These effects are the result of relatively high levels of amino acids, invert sugar and minerals.

== Nutrition ==
Molasses
Nutritional value per 100 g (3.5 oz)
- Energy: 1,213 kJ (290 kcal)
- Carbohydrates: 74.7 g
- Sugars sucrose glucose fructose: 74.7 g 5.1–52.2 g 0–20.5 g 7.9–18.5 g
- Dietary fiber: 0 g
- Fat: 0.1 g
- Protein: 0 g
Vitamins and minerals
Vitamins	Quantity %DV^{†}
Thiamine (B1)	3% 0.041 mg
Riboflavin (B2)	0% 0.002 mg
Niacin (B3)	6% 0.93 mg
Pantothenic acid (B5)	16% 0.804 mg
Vitamin B6	39% 0.67 mg
Choline	2% 13.3 mg
Minerals	Quantity %DV^{†}
Calcium	16% 205 mg
Iron	26% 4.72 mg
Magnesium	58% 242 mg
Manganese	67% 1.53 mg
Phosphorus	2% 31 mg
Potassium	49% 1464 mg
Sodium	2% 37 mg
Zinc	3% 0.29 mg
- Other constituents: Quantity
- Water: 21.9 g
- Link to USDA Database entry
- ^{†}Percentages estimated using US recommendations for adults, except for potassium, which is estimated based on expert recommendation from the National Academies.

Molasses is composed of 22% water, 75% carbohydrates, and very small amounts (0.1%) of fat; it contains no protein. In a reference amount of 100 grams, molasses is a rich source (20% or more of the Daily Value, DV) of vitamin B6 and several dietary minerals, including manganese, magnesium, iron, potassium, and calcium.

The sugars in molasses are on average sucrose (39% of total carbohydrates), glucose (16%), and fructose (17%) (data from USDA nutrition table).

== Other uses ==
=== Food products and additives ===
The uses of molasses in food production may include:

- Principal ingredient in the distillation of rum
- Production of dark rye bread
- Production of gingerbread (particularly in the Americas)
- Production of barbecue sauces
- Some brown sugar is made by combining molasses with white sugar
- In some beer styles of stouts and porters
- Stabilization of emulsions in home-made vinaigrette
- Additive in mu'assel (also known as shisha), the tobacco smoked in a hookah

=== Industrial ===
- As a minor component of mortar for brickwork
- Mixed with gelatin glue and glycerine in casting composition ink rollers on early printing presses

=== Horticultural ===
- As a soil additive to promote microbial activity, resulting in increased production of succinic acid, malic acid, butyric acid and mannitol. Production of these common plant defensive chemicals by microbes is believed to aid in suppressing plant disease.

== See also ==
- Anadama bread
- Caramelization
- Corn syrup
- Date molasses
- Great Molasses Flood
- Panela (piloncillo)
- Jaggery
- Kuromitsu
- Maple syrup
- Muscovado
- Pekmez
- Shoofly pie
- Treacle
