= Hadacol =

Patent medicine marketed as a vitamin supplement; known for its 12% alcohol content

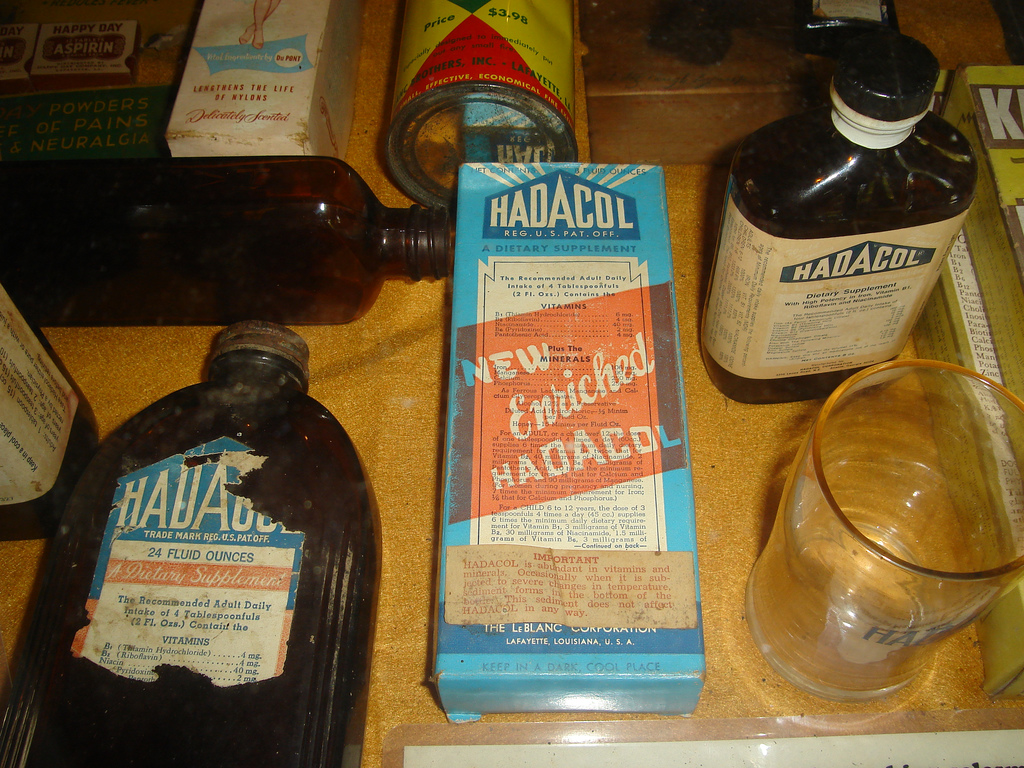
Old Hadacol box and bottles

Hadacol was a patent medicine marketed as a vitamin supplement. Its principal attraction, however, was that it contained 12 percent alcohol (listed on the tonic bottle's label as a "preservative"), which made it quite popular in the dry counties of the southern United States. It was the product of four-term Louisiana State Senator Dudley J. LeBlanc, a Democrat from Erath in Vermilion Parish in southwestern Louisiana. He was not a medical doctor, nor a registered pharmacist, but had a strong talent for self-promotion. Time magazine once described him as "a stem-winding salesman who knows every razzle-dazzle switch in the pitchman's trade".

== Dosage ==
The label on the tonic's bottle clearly stated that the recommended dosage (1 tablespoonful taken 4 times a day) was to be taken "...in a 1/2 glass of water after meals and before retiring". However, some pharmacies in dry counties were known to sell it by the shot-glass and at least one bar in New Orleans' French Quarter was known to sell a "Tassel Cocktail" with Hadacol as an ingredient. In Northbrook, Illinois, a suburb of Chicago, sales of Hadacol were limited to liquor stores.

One of the tonic's unusual ingredients, "diluted acid hydrochloric", is what is known as a "hydrochloric wash": a heavily diluted form of the acid that opens the arteries and allows the body's quicker absorption of the other ingredients, including the 12 percent alcohol "preservative".

== Promotion ==
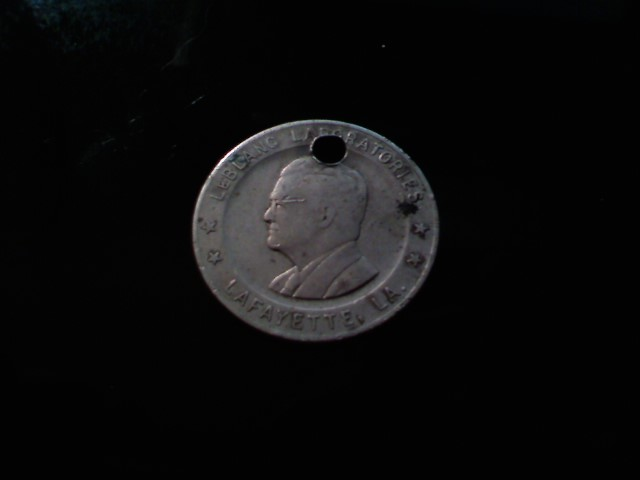
Front of a 1948 Hadacol 25¢ token. LeBlanc's picture is center. Top says "LEBLANC LABORATORIES". Bottom says "LAFAYETTE, LA." The hole punched in it at the top was done at the time of redemption. Click to view large size

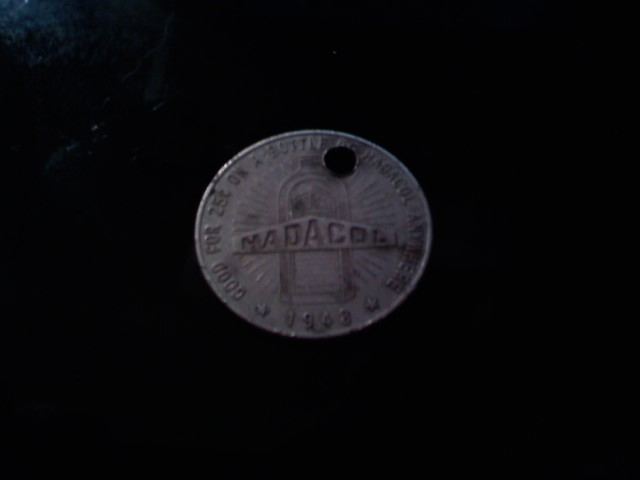
Back of a 1948 Hadacol 25¢ token. The center image is a Hadacol bottle with a "HADACOL" banner across it. Top says "GOOD FOR 25¢ ON A BOTTLE OF HADACOL ANYWHERE". Bottom says "1948". The hole punched in it at the top was done at the time of redemption. Click to view large size.

LeBlanc, a consummate salesman, created the name from his business, the Happy Day Company, formerly the maker of Happy Day Headache Powders (which the Food and Drug Administration had seized in 1942, as dangerous to health, and falsely labeled) and Dixie Dew Cough Syrup. His own last name provided the "L" (however the resultant -ol at the end of the name also was helpfully indicative of the nostrum's alcohol content). When LeBlanc was asked about the name, he would often joke "Well, I hadda' call it something!"

A two-page advertisement for Hadacol appeared in the centerfold of the 1951 edition of Grier's Almanac, an annual publication marketed to farmers in the Southern US. The ad's headline read (in very large type):

Don't Be Satisfied With Symptomatic Relief! It's Possible to RELIEVE THE CAUSE OF YOUR AILMENTS When Lack Of Vitamins B_{1}, B_{2}, Iron and Niacin Cause Stomach Disturbances, Gas, Heartburn, Indigestion, Nagging Aches and Pains, and Certain Nervous Disorders.

The advertisement continued with testimonials and a glowing plug for Senator LeBlanc, stressing the curative powers of Hadacol for a number of ailments "...due to lack of Vitamins B_{1}, B_{2}, Iron and Niacin". A capsule version of Hadacol was briefly produced, consisting solely of a B-Vitamin and mineral mixture.

LeBlanc promoted the tonic as a dietary supplement instead of a medicine, stating that it was "...formulated as an Aid to Nature in rebuilding the Pep, Strength and Energy of Buoyant Health when the System is deficient in the Vitamins and Minerals found in this Tonic..." But Time Magazine described it as "a murky brown liquid that tastes something like bilge water, and smells worse."

The American Medical Association was also unappreciative. In an official press release in 1951, the AMA stated "It is hoped that no doctor will be uncritical enough to join in the promotion of Hadacol. It is difficult to imagine how one could do himself or his profession greater harm from the standpoint of the abuse of the trust of a patient suffering from any condition. Hadacol is not a specific medication. It is not even a specific preventive measure."

LeBlanc flooded the airwaves with testimonials to the powers of the brown liquid and turned the jingle called "Hadacol Boogie" into a popular recording. Promotional items included various fliers, signs and clocks, a "Captain Hadacol" comic book, T-shirts, lipstick, an almanac, plastic thimbles printed with the Hadacol logo, water pistols and cowboy-style holsters, glasses used for taking the diluted mixture, and a stamped metal token redeemable for 25¢ towards the purchase of any bottle of Hadacol (LeBlanc placed his own portrait on the front of the token, and the trademarked logo on the back). These items, along with the Hadacol bottles and the boxes they were packaged in, are now sought-after items among collectors of Southern memorabilia and medical quackery.

In 1950, LeBlanc offered a handsome financial incentive to anyone who could provide him with a parrot that was trained to say "Polly wants Hadacol!" The parrot was to be exhibited at promotions. The offer included the following:

The owner of such a bird, if selected, will be given a reasonable compensation on a contract basis. The owner and the parrot will travel in a limousine with the parrot's name engraved in gold on the door and will stay only at the best hotels. The parrot will be furnished a gold cage and its life insured. The parrot will visit large drugstores, perform at conventions, etc., and may be presented on radio and television. The Le Blanc Corporation has a triple A high credit rating.

== The Hadacol Caravan ==
According to musician Weldon "Big Bill" Lister, who performed in the Hadacol Caravan, "The only way you could get into that show was with a Hadacol boxtop, And believe me, we played to crowds of ten, twelve thousand people a night. Back in those days there wasn't many auditoriums that would hold that many people. We played ball parks, race tracks - you know anywhere where they had enough big bleachers to handle those kind of crowds." The final show was on 17 September 1951. Paul Schrader wrote a script entitled Eight Scenes from the Life of Hank Williams, which has not yet been produced. It includes a sequence on his performances with the Hadacol Caravan.

== Downfall ==
In a 15-month period ending in March 1951, LeBlanc sold more than $3,600,000 worth of the tonic. In another six months, after LeBlanc sold his interest in the LeBlanc Corporation (Hadacol's parent company) to investors for $8,200,000, the enterprise collapsed under the weight of creditors. It was discovered all too late that LeBlanc was spending more for advertising by that point than he was taking in as receipts (turning its $3,600,000 profit into a $1,800,000 second-quarter loss), had concealed both $2,000,000 in unpaid bills and a $656,151 tax debt, and another $2,000,000, listed in the ledgers as "Accounts Receivable", were cases of the tonic out on consignment, much of which was being shipped back. In an official court statement, the Federal Trade Commission stated that the publicity behind the tonic was "false, misleading and deceptive" in representing the nostrum as "an effective treatment and cure for scores of ailments and diseases." The ensuing bad publicity played a contributing factor to LeBlanc losing a gubernatorial election in 1952 and effectively halting his future statewide electoral chances.

Martin Gardner's In the Name of Science (1952) mentions an interview that LeBlanc gave on Groucho Marx's radio program: When Marx asked LeBlanc what Hadacol was good for, LeBlanc gave an answer of startling honesty. "It was good," the senator said, "for five million dollars for me last year." In 1954, after the Hadacol fiasco, LeBlanc tried to re-enter the patent medicine market with a lemon-flavored non-alcoholic vitamin tonic named "Kary-On". Unlike Hadacol, it quickly vanished from production.

According to the United States Patent and Trademark Office, there were two attempts to revive Hadacol. The first was in 1987 by Edmondson Enterprises of Shreveport, Louisiana. The second attempt was in 1997 by Au Pharmaceuticals of Tyler, Texas. Both attempts to revive the brand were unsuccessful. In 1976, "Hadacol" multi-vitamins were distributed by the Atlanta, Georgia-based "Hadacol Corporation" in an unsuccessful attempt to revive the brand name.

== In popular culture ==
- Hadacol was the subject of several country, R&B, and cajun tunes of its time:
  - "Drinkin' Hadacol" by "Little Willie" Littlefield
  - "Everybody Loves That Hadacol" by Tiny Hill and His Orchestra
  - "H-A-D-A-C-O-L" by Al Terry (Allison Theriot)
  - "Hadacol (That's All)" by the Treniers
  - "What Put the Pep in Grandma" by Kenneth C. "Jethro" Burns and Mel Foree, performed by Audrey Williams with the Drifting Cowboys
  - "Hadacol Boogie", recorded by Bill Nettles and His Dixie Blue Boys and covered by many artists including a 2006 collaboration of Jerry Lee Lewis and Buddy Guy (whose version on Lewis's Last Man Standing album ends with an outro alluding to LeBlanc's "Hadda call it somethin'" joke)
  - "Hadacol Bounce", written and recorded by Bill Nettles and performed also by Professor Longhair
  - "Hadacol Corners" by Slim Willet (backed with the soon-to-be classic "Don't Let the Stars Get In Your Eyes")
  - "Valse de Hadacol" (Hadacol Waltz) by Cajun musician/composer Harry Choates
  - Jimmy Durante sang about it ("I even mix it with my Hadacol") in the 1951 novelty song "Black Strap Molasses".
  - It's referenced in the jazz song "Here's a Little Girl from Jacksonville" as recorded by Blue Lu Barker and Maria Muldaur.
  - It's mentioned in two Wynonie Harris songs: "Lovin' Machine", (1952); and "The Deacon Don't Like It", (1953): "...they tell me Hadacol Whiskey is really the very best kind".
  - It's referenced as the secret to Rudolph's red nose in the Christmas song "Rudolph the Red-Nosed Reindeer" as recorded by Bing Crosby and Judy Garland in a 1950 recording.
- In 1949, Blues pianist Elmore "Elmo" Nixon made his debut as a "front man" when he recorded two songs under the name "Elmore Nix and the Hadacol Boys".
- "Hadacol Corner" was the originally proposed name for the town of Midkiff in Upton County, Texas, but the U.S. Postal Service objected (presumably because it disapproved of a registered brand name being used as the name of a town).
- In 2026 author James Lee Burke released the novel "The Hadacol Boogie"

== See also ==
- Jamaica ginger
- Geritol
- Buckfast Tonic Wine
