= Black Strap Molasses =

1951 novelty song by Carmine Ennis and Marilou Harrington

Single by Danny Kaye, Jimmy Durante, Jane Wyman, and Groucho Marx
- A-side: "How D' Ye Do and Shake Hands (from the film Alice in Wonderland)"
- Released: August 1951
- Recorded: August 12, 1951, with chorus and orchestra directed by Sonny Burke
- Genre: Popular
- Length: 2:39
- Label: Decca Records
- Songwriters: Carmine Ennis, Marilou Harrington

Black Strap Molasses is a novelty song by Carmine Ennis and Marilou Harrington, released in August 1951. It was recorded by the movie stars Groucho Marx, Jimmy Durante, Jane Wyman, and Danny Kaye, with chorus and orchestra directed by Sonny Burke. The song was a popular success, reaching number 29 on the Billboard charts, but was banned from some radio networks because it was perceived as promoting commercial products.

== Song ==
The song was recorded for Decca Records on August 12, 1951. It was sung by a "who's who" of show business at the time: Danny Kaye, Jimmy Durante, Jane Wyman, and Groucho Marx. The vocalists were accompanied by a chorus and orchestra directed by arranger and producer Sonny Burke.

The song's lyrics discuss popular health foods of the time. The verses make "absurd" claims about the supposed benefits of these foods, and the chorus runs:

Black strap molasses and the wheat germ bread
Makes you live so long you wish you were dead
You add a little yogurt and you'll be well fed
On the black strap molasses and the wheat germ bread.

One contemporary review interpreted the lyrics as referring specifically to the "Live Longer" diet advocated by nutritionist Gayelord Hauser. Hauser, labeled a "quack" by the American Medical Association, gained widespread popularity in the mid-twentieth century promoting "wonder foods" including blackstrap molasses, wheat germ, and yogurt, as well as brewer's yeast and powdered milk. He was known as a nutrition guru to many Hollywood celebrities.

== Release and reception ==
The version of Black Strap Molasses featuring Wyman, Durante, Marx, and Kaye was released in August 1951. It was released as the B-side of a single, along with a recording of "How D' Ye Do and Shake Hands", from Disney's then-recent film Alice in Wonderland, sung by the same "all-star" cast. As part of a promotion campaign for the single, Decca Records partnered with Balanced Foods, Inc., a company associated with Hauser's diets, to provide DJs and record distributors with pint bottles of blackstrap molasses and loaves of wheat germ bread. Black Strap Molasses was catalogued in 78rpm record format as Decca 27748, and in 45rpm format as Decca 9–27748.

The song was a hit in the US, reaching number 29 on the overall Billboard charts on September 22, 1951. Billboard magazine's staff review called it "catchy" and a "sock performance", giving it an aggregated rating of "excellent". Film writer Allan Eyles wrote that the song represented Marx's "greatest success as a singer".

The song was banned by some radio networks because it was perceived as containing "free plugs" for molasses and the patent medicine Hadacol; ABC agreed to program it only after a reference to Hadacol was removed. CBS banned it entirely, on the grounds that it contained "medical advice" which could lead listeners to believe that molasses was "good for sexual debility, insomnia, nerves and underweight condition." A different version of Black Strap Molasses, a "rhythm paean to Gaylord Hauser" by Tommy Dorsey and his orchestra, had been released earlier and reviewed in Billboard as "a rambling, rather dull slice." Dorsey's version had been banned from programming by NBC and ABC because, representatives said, the song mentioned commercial products in competition with the networks' sponsors.

The single was released in the UK, catalogued as Brunswick 04794, and later re-released on several record and CD collections.
