= Photic retinopathy =

Damage to the retina from intense sources of light

- Other names: Foveomacular retinitis Solar retinopathy
- Specialty: Ophthalmology

Photic retinopathy is damage to the eye's retina, particularly the macula, from prolonged exposure to solar radiation or other bright light, e.g., lasers or arc welders. The term includes solar, laser, and welder's retinopathy and is synonymous with retinal phototoxicity.

== Signs and symptoms ==
- Long-term reduced eyesight
- Central or paracentral scotoma

Vision loss due to solar retinopathy is typically reversible, lasting for as short as one month to over one year. The fundus changes are variable and usually bilateral, mild cases often show no alteration and moderate to severe cases show a foveal yellow spot on the first days after exposure. After a few days it is replaced by a reddish dot often surrounded by pigment.

Permanent holes and lesions are possible; prognosis worsens with dilated pupils or prolonged exposure.

== Pathophysiology ==
Although it is frequently claimed that the retina is burned by looking at the Sun, retinal damage appears to occur primarily due to photochemical injury rather than thermal injury. The temperature rise from looking at the Sun with a 3-mm pupil only causes a 4 °C increase in temperature, insufficient to photocoagulate. The energy is still phototoxic: since light promotes oxidation, chemical reactions occur in the exposed tissues with unbonded oxygen molecules. It also appears that central serous retinopathy can be a result of a depression in a treated solar damaged eye.

The duration of exposure necessary to cause injury varies with the intensity of light, and also affects the possibility and length of recovery.

== Diagnosis ==
A person with photic retinopathy may notice an impairment in their vision, for example a spot that does not go away after a reasonable recovery time, or blurring. They may also have eye pain or headaches. Vision impairment is usually in both eyes, but can be in just one. Impairment of a person with 20/20 vision usually ends up being about 20/40 or 20/60, but can be better or far worse.

A doctor examining an eye with retinopathy may be able to see no signs at all, or a slight macular edema, which is a sort of blister on or under the macula, an oval colored spot normally visible to an eye doctor on each person's retina.

But while even that edema goes away, within a few days the patient will generally develop a discoloration of the retina at the injured point, often yellow or white, turning red over the next few weeks.

== Treatment ==
Photic retinopathy generally goes away on its own over time, but there is no specific treatment known to be reliable for speeding recovery. One path sometimes attempted, which has unclear results, is to treat the initial macular edema with corticosteroids.

== Prognosis ==
Generally speaking, people diagnosed with photic retinopathy recover visual acuity completely within two months, though more severe cases may take longer, or not see complete recovery at all.

== See also ==
- Retinopathy
