= Stewart Duke-Elder =

Scottish ophthalmologist (1898–1978)

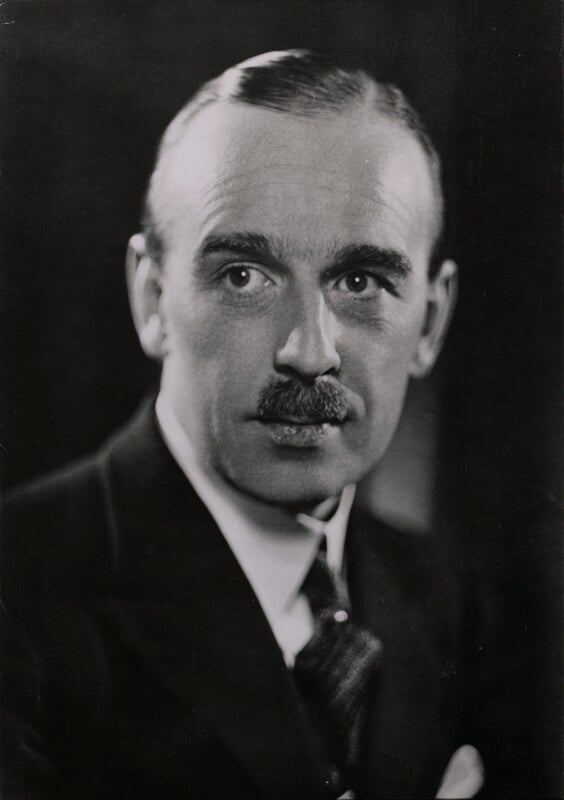
Duke-Elder in 1948

Sir William Stewart Duke-Elder GCVO FRS FRCP FRCS (22 April 1898 – 27 March 1978) was a Scottish ophthalmologist, a dominant force in his field for more than a quarter of a century.

== Life ==
Duke-Elder was born in the manse in Tealing near Dundee. His father, Rev Neil Stewart Elder, was the village minister of the Free Church of Scotland. His mother was Isabelle Duke, daughter of Rev John Duke of the Free Church in Campsie, Stirlingshire.

Duke-Elder was educated at Morgan Academy in Dundee, and was school dux for 1914–1915.

Duke-Elder entered the University of St Andrews in 1915 on scholarship, and graduated in 1919 with a BSc in Physiology and MA (Hons) in Natural Sciences. He graduated from the University of St Andrews School of Medicine in 1923 with an MB ChB. In 1925, he earned an MD from St Andrews for his dissertation on 'Reaction of the eye to changes in osmotic pressure of the blood'.

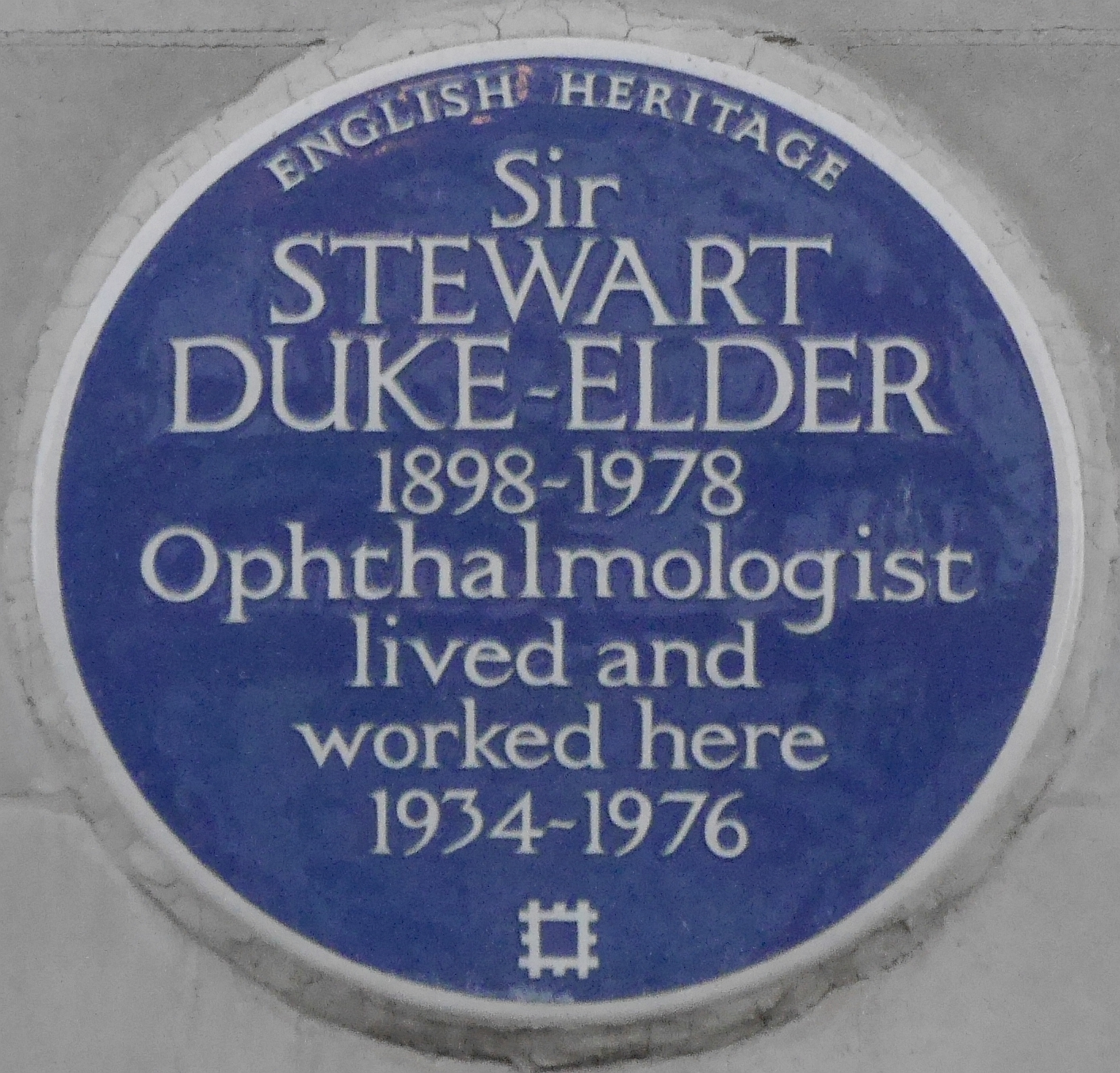
Blue plaque, 63 Harley Street, London

In 1927, Duke-Elder earned a DSc from St Andrews for his thesis on "The nature of the intraocular fluids and the pressure equilibrium in the eye".

Duke-Elder produced seven volumes of Textbook of Ophthalmology and fifteen volumes of System of Ophthalmology, along with many other textbooks and scientific papers that provided the educational foundation for most of the world's ophthalmologists. This monumental contribution to medical literature earned Duke-Elder the title of Fellow of the Royal Society in 1960.

In addition to his own writings, Duke-Elder served for many years as editor and chairman of the editorial committee of the British Journal of Ophthalmology and Ophthalmic Literature and he was instrumental in the formation and research direction of the Institute of Ophthalmology, formerly the Central London Ophthalmic Hospital, now part of the University College London. He was knighted in the 1933 King's Birthday Honours List, and subsequently earned many more honours, including being appointed at a Knight Commander of the Royal Victorian Order (KCVO) in the 1946 New Year Honours and being upgraded to the rank of Knight Grand Cross of the Royal Victorian Order (GCVO) in the 1958 New Year Honours serving as the Surgeon-Oculist to King Edward VIII, George VI and Queen Elizabeth II. In 1946 he formed the Faculty of Ophthalmologists.

Duke-Elder was awarded the 1957 Lister Medal for his contributions to surgical science. The corresponding Lister Oration, given at the Royal College of Surgeons of England, was delivered on 28 March 1958, and was titled 'The Emergence of Vision in the Animal World'.

Duke-Elder had a long and successful marriage to his wife Phyllis, who had been his medical assistant. They had no children.

Duke-Elder died at his home at St John's Wood in London on 27 March 1978.

== Publications ==
- Textbook of Ophthalmology (1954)
- A Century of International Ophthalmology (1958)
- Neuro-ophthalmology (1971)
- Ocular Motility and Strabismus (1973)
- System of Ophthalmology (multiple editions)
- Practice of refraction (multiple editions)
