= William Bates (physician) =

American ophthalmologist (1860-1931)

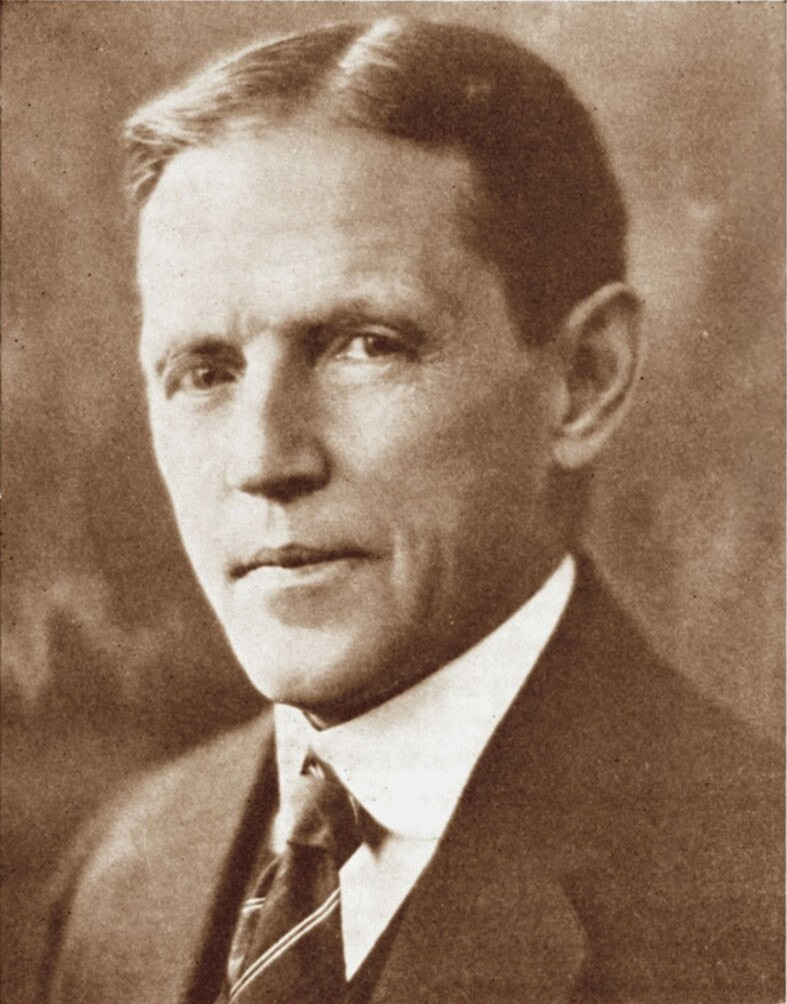
- Born: December 23, 1860; Newark, New Jersey, United States
- Died: July 10, 1931 (aged 70); New York City, New York, United States
- Education: Cornell University (BA); Columbia University (MD)
- Known for: Developing the Bates method
- Scientific career
- Fields: Ophthalmology

William Horatio Bates (December 23, 1860 – July 10, 1931) was an American physician who practiced ophthalmology and developed what became known as the Bates method for better eyesight. The method was based in his theory that the eye does not focus by changing the power of the lens, but rather by elongating the eyeball through use of the extraocular oblique muscles; this model contradicted mainstream ophthalmology and optometry then and now.

== Career ==
Bates graduated A.B. from Cornell University in 1881 and received his medical degree at Columbia University's College of Physicians and Surgeons in 1885. He formulated a theory about vision health, and published the book Perfect Sight Without Glasses in 1920, and the magazine Better Eyesight from 1919 to 1930. Parts of Bates' approach to treating vision disorders were based on psychological principles that were contrary to many of the medical theories of the time and remain so. The Bates method still enjoys some limited acceptance as a modality of alternative medicine.

Bates treated many patients, who claimed to have been cured of vision defects, especially myopia. This brought him into conflict with his peers. He defended himself by claiming that other physicians were in thrall to the establishment.

== Bates' publications ==
Because the copyrights have expired, the original version of Perfect Sight Without Glasses (or The Cure of Imperfect Sight by Treatment Without Glasses) is now in the public domain. In 1943, an abridged version was published under the title Better Eyesight Without Glasses, which removed some of the most controversial points, such as the claim that "perfectly remembering black" is a suitable substitute for anaesthesia, and recommendations to look at the sun.

== Disappearance ==
On August 30, 1902, Bates wrote a letter to his wife while she was visiting her mother and sent her some books and instruments from his apartment. In the letter he said that he had been "called out of town to some major operations", and would be accompanying an old student, Dr. Forche. Bates expressed excitement over the potential of receiving a large sum of money for this, and promised to write more details later. His wife received no further letters from him.

Six weeks later he was found to be working as an assistant in Charing Cross Hospital, London, after reportedly being first admitted as a patient. His wife then travelled there and found him in a nervous state suffering from apparent amnesia. She invited him to stay with her in the Savoy Hotel. Two days later, he disappeared again. His wife continued searching for him after his second disappearance, but subsequently died before finding him again.

In 1910, an old colleague of Bates, Dr. J. E. Kelly, was travelling through Grand Forks, North Dakota, where he encountered Bates practicing. He subsequently persuaded Bates to return to New York and share an office with him, where he is said to have "worked as hard and as successfully as he had done before his original disappearance".

== Personal life ==
William Horatio Bates was born on December 23, 1860, to Charles and Amelia Halsey Bates.

Bates was married three times. He first married Edith Kitchell in 1883, with whom he had a son: Charles Halsey Bates; Kitchell died in 1886. He then married Margaret Crawford, with whom he had a daughter, Milo Bates, and a son, William Crawford Bates. After being widowed again, in 1928 he married Emily C. Lierman, his long-time personal assistant.

His son, Charles Halsey Bates disappeared in August 1928.

Bates enjoyed playing tennis and was once the North Dakota State Champion. He was also an avid runner who enjoyed literature and astronomy.

He died on July 10, 1931, after a year-long illness. His will excluded his eldest son, who was still missing at the time.

== Discovery of the medical use of adrenaline ==
Bates also discovered the astringent and haemostatic properties of the substance produced by the adrenal glands, and its value in medicine, especially in surgeries. The substance was later commercialized as adrenaline.

== See also ==
- Norma Shearer
- Daniel A. Poling
- Aldous Huxley
