= Indira Gandhi =

Prime Minister of India (1966–1977; 1980–1984)

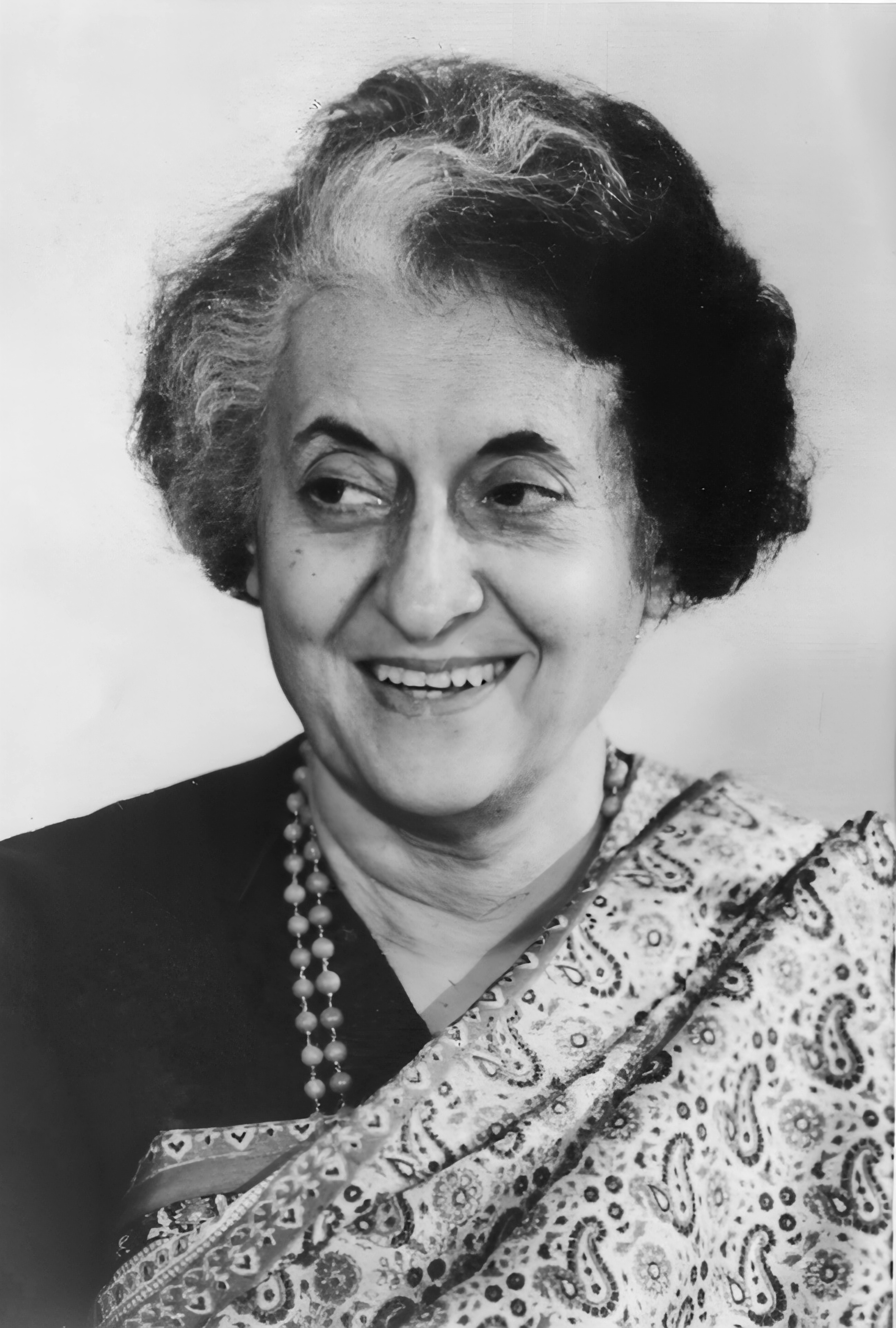
- Official portrait, 1983

Prime Minister of India
- In office 14 January 1980 – 31 October 1984
- President: Neelam Sanjiva Reddy; Zail Singh
- Vice President: Mohammad Hidayatullah; Ramaswamy Venkataraman
- Preceded by: Charan Singh
- Succeeded by: Rajiv Gandhi
- In office 24 January 1966 – 24 March 1977
- President: Sarvepalli Radhakrishnan; Zakir Husain; V. V. Giri (acting); Mohammad Hidayatullah (acting); V. V. Giri; Fakhruddin Ali Ahmed; B. D. Jatti (acting)
- Vice President: Zakir Husain; V. V. Giri; Gopal Swarup Pathak; B. D. Jatti
- Deputy: Morarji Desai (13 March 1967 – 16 July 1969)
- Preceded by: Lal Bahadur Shastri; Gulzarilal Nanda (acting)
- Succeeded by: Morarji Desai
Ministerial offices
Union Minister of External Affairs
In office 19 July 1984 – 31 October 1984
Prime Minister	Herself
Preceded by	P. V. Narasimha Rao
Succeeded by	Rajiv Gandhi
In office 6 September 1967 – 13 February 1969
Prime Minister	Herself
Preceded by	M. C. Chagla
Succeeded by	Dinesh Singh
Union Minister of Defence
In office 14 January 1980 – 15 January 1982
Prime Minister	Herself
Preceded by	Chidambaram Subramaniam
Succeeded by	Ramaswamy Venkataraman
In office 1 December 1975 – 20 December 1975
Prime Minister	Herself
Preceded by	Swaran Singh
Succeeded by	Bansi Lal
Union Minister of Home Affairs
In office 27 June 1970 – 5 February 1973
Prime Minister	Herself
Preceded by	Yashwantrao Chavan
Succeeded by	Uma Shankar Dikshit
In office 9 November 1966 – 13 November 1966
Prime Minister	Herself
Preceded by	Gulzarilal Nanda
Succeeded by	Yashwantrao Chavan
Union Minister of Finance
In office 17 July 1969 – 27 June 1970
Prime Minister	Herself
Preceded by	Morarji Desai
Succeeded by	Yashwantrao Chavan
Union Minister of Information & Broadcasting
In office 9 June 1964 – 24 January 1966
Prime Minister	Lal Bahadur Shastri; Gulzarilal Nanda (acting)
Preceded by	Satya Narayan Sinha
Succeeded by	Kodardas Kalidas Shah
Other political offices
President of the Indian National Congress (Indira)
In office 1978–1984
Preceded by	Devakanta Barua (of INC (R))
Succeeded by	Rajiv Gandhi
President of the Indian National Congress
In office 1959
Preceded by	U. N. Dhebar
Succeeded by	Neelam Sanjiva Reddy
Member of Parliament, Lok Sabha
In office 1980–1984
Preceded by	Mallikarjun Mudiraj
Succeeded by	P. Manik Reddy
Constituency	Medak, Andhra Pradesh
In office 1978–1980
Preceded by	D. B. Chandregowda
Succeeded by	D. M. Puttegowda
Constituency	Chikmagalur, Karnataka
In office 1967–1977
Preceded by	Baijnath Kureel
Succeeded by	Raj Narain
Constituency	Rae Bareli, Uttar Pradesh
Member of Parliament, Rajya Sabha
In office 26 August 1964 – 23 February 1967
Constituency	Uttar Pradesh

Personal details
- Born: Indira Priyadarshini Nehru; 19 November 1917 Allahabad, United Provinces of Agra and Oudh, British India
- Died: 31 October 1984 (aged 66) New Delhi, India
- Cause of death: Assassination
- Party: Indian National Congress (1938–1969); Indian National Congress (Requisitionists) (1969–1978); Indian National Congress (Indira) (1978–1984)
- Spouse: Feroze Gandhi (m. 1942; died 1960)
- Children: Rajiv; Sanjay
- Parents: Jawaharlal Nehru; Kamala Nehru
- Relatives: Nehru–Gandhi family
- Education: Visva-Bharati University (dropped out); Somerville College, Oxford (dropped out)
- Occupation: Politician; writer; stateswoman
- Awards: See below
- Website: Memorial
- Nickname: "Mother Indira"
- Gandhi's voice Gandhi on India–United States relations Recorded 29 July 1982

Indira Priyadarshini Gandhi (Note: Hindi: [ˈɪndɪɾaː ˈɡaːndʱiː].) (née Nehru; 19 November 1917 – 31 October 1984) was an Indian stateswoman who twice served as the Prime Minister of India from 1966 to 1977 and again from 1980 until her assassination in 1984. She was India's first and only female prime minister, and a central figure in Indian politics as the leader of the Indian National Congress (INC). Gandhi also served as chairperson of the Non-Aligned Movement (NAM) from 1983 to 1984, becoming the first Indian to hold the position. She was the daughter of Jawaharlal Nehru, the first prime minister of India, and the mother of Rajiv Gandhi, who succeeded her as prime minister.

Gandhi was married to Feroze Gandhi, a Member of Parliament, with whom she had two sons, Rajiv Gandhi and Sanjay Gandhi. During her father Jawaharlal Nehru's premiership from 1947 to 1964, Gandhi was his hostess and accompanied him on his numerous foreign trips. In 1959, she played a part in the dissolution of the communist-led Kerala state government as then-president of the Indian National Congress, otherwise a ceremonial position to which she was elected earlier that year. Lal Bahadur Shastri, who had succeeded Nehru as prime minister upon his death in 1964, appointed her minister of information and broadcasting in his government; the same year she was elected to the Rajya Sabha, the upper house of the Indian Parliament, representing Uttar Pradesh. After Shastri's death in January 1966, Gandhi defeated Morarji Desai in the INC's parliamentary leadership election to become leader and succeeded Shastri as prime minister. With her premiership of India she became the world's second female prime minister after Sri Lanka's Sirimavo Bandaranaike. She led the Congress to a majority in the 1967 Indian general election, in which she was first elected to the lower house of the Indian parliament, the Lok Sabha, from Rae Bareli, in Uttar Pradesh. In 1969, the INC expelled Gandhi from the party in a dispute over government policy and party discipline. Gandhi and her supporters formed a new party, the INC (R), which formed India's first coalition government. In the 1971 Indian general election, the INC (R) won a landslide victory, focusing on issues such as poverty.

As prime minister, Gandhi was known for her uncompromising political stances and centralisation of power within the executive branch. In 1967, she headed a military conflict with China in which India repelled Chinese incursions into Sikkim, an Indian protectorate in the Himalayas. In the same year, the Naxalbari uprising in West Bengal was suppressed. In 1971, she went to war with Pakistan in support of the independence movement and war of independence in East Pakistan, which resulted in an Indian victory, the end of the Bangladeshi genocide, and the independence of Bangladesh, as well as an increase in India's influence to the point where it became the sole regional power in South Asia. The end of East Pakistan weakened the Insurgency in North-East India. In 1975, Sikkim joined the Indian Union. The same year, Kashmiri separatists had to agree to an accord establishing special autonomous status for Kashmir in return for dropping long-standing demands for a plebiscite. Jammu and Kashmir became a constituent unit of India. Another military operation against Pakistan, codenamed Operation Meghdoot, occurred during her tenure in 1984, which led to India expanding the territory it effectively controlled in the disputed Kashmir region.

Gandhi's rule saw India grow closer to the Soviet Union by signing a friendship treaty in 1971 to ward off the perceived geopolitical threat of the alliance between the United States and Pakistan. India received military, financial, and diplomatic support from the Soviet Union during its conflict with Pakistan in the same year. Though India was at the forefront of the Non-Aligned Movement, Gandhi made it one of the Soviet Union's closest allies in Asia, each often supporting the other at the United Nations and in proxy wars in Vietnam, Cambodia, and Afghanistan. Gandhi played a crucial role in initiating India's first successful nuclear weapon test in 1974, codenamed 'Smiling Buddha', a year after the United States and the People's Republic of China established friendly relations, in 1973.

Responding to the verdict on State of Uttar Pradesh v. Raj Narain, and citing powers to tackle "internal disturbance" under Article 352 of the Constitution, Gandhi instituted a state of emergency from 1975 to 1977, during which she ruled by decree and basic civil liberties were suspended. More than 100,000 political opponents, journalists and dissenters were imprisoned. Following the Emergency, the INC lost the 1977 Indian general election in the midst of anti-incumbency sentiment in North India — the first such loss for the INC in the history of the Republic of India. She lost her own parliamentary constituency, Rae Bareli, albeit the INC swept the seats in South India and North-East India. She withdrew her membership of INC (R) and was publicly persecuted by the ruling Janata Party government for implementing and directing the Emergency. However, she gained parliamentary immunity by winning the Chikmagalur by-election in Karnataka in 1978. The same year, Gandhi and her supporters formed a new political party, the INC (I). Due to her public perception as a strong leader, public sympathy over her prosecution by the Janata Party government, and the weak governance of the Janata Party ministers, the Congress (I) won the 1980 Indian general election by a landslide and Gandhi returned to the premiership. She represented Medak, then in Andhra Pradesh, from 1980 to 1984.

As Prime Minister starting in 1980, Gandhi implemented economic reforms which led to India's fastest GDP growth in its history up till that date, averaging 5.7% for the decade. This was a departure from the so-called Hindu rate of growth in which India grew 3.5% annually from the 1950s to the 1970s. Her second son, Sanjay Gandhi, who was Congress (I) General Secretary, died in an aviation accident in June 1980. Gandhi faced also the Sikh separatist movement throughout her fourth premiership; in response, she ordered Operation Blue Star, which involved military action in the Golden Temple and killed hundreds of Sikhs. On 31 October 1984, she was assassinated by two of her bodyguards, both of whom were Sikh nationalists seeking retribution for the events at the temple. Her death was the trigger for the 1984 Anti-Sikh Riots in the nation's capital, Delhi. Her cumulative tenure of 15 years and 350 days, spanning four terms, makes her the second-longest-serving Indian prime minister after her father and the longest-serving female head of government at the time of her death.

Gandhi was cremated at the site now known as Shakti Sthal (transl. 'Place of strength'). The site is marked by a large monolithic rock of iron ore commemorating her as the "Iron Lady of India". Gandhi is remembered as one of the most powerful women in the world. Her supporters cite her leadership during victories over geopolitical rivals China and Pakistan, the Green Revolution, a growing economy in the early 1980s, and her anti-poverty campaign that led her to be known as Mother Indira among the country's poor and rural population. Critics note her cult of personality and authoritarian rule of India during the Emergency. In 1999, she was named "Woman of the Millennium" in an online poll organised by the BBC. In 2020, she was named by Time magazine among the 100 women who defined the past century as counterparts to the magazine's previous choices for Man of the Year.

== Early life and career ==
Indira Gandhi was born in British ruled India as Indira Nehru, into a Kashmiri Pandit family on 19 November 1917 in Allahabad (present-day Prayagraj) in Uttar Pradesh. Her father, Jawaharlal Nehru, was a leading figure in the Indian movement for independence from British rule, and became the first Prime Minister of the Dominion (and later Republic) of India. Indira was her parents' only surviving child (she had a younger brother who died while young); she grew up with her mother, Kamala Nehru, at the Anand Bhavan, a large family estate in Allahabad. In 1930, the Nehru family donated the mansion to the Indian National Congress and renamed it Swaraj Bhavan (meaning abode of freedom). A new mansion was built nearby to serve as the family residence and given the name of the old Anand Bhavan. Indira had a lonely and unhappy childhood. Her father was often away, directing political activities or incarcerated, while her mother was frequently bedridden with illness and later suffered an early death from tuberculosis. Indira had limited contact with her father, mostly through letters.

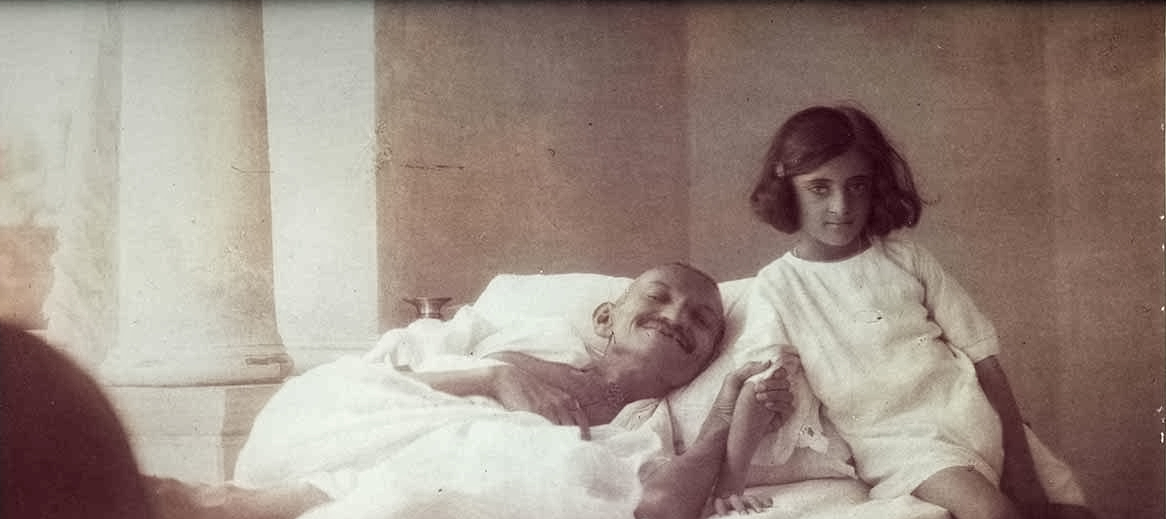
A young Indira with Mahatma Gandhi during his fast in 1924. Indira is dressed in a khadi garment and shown following Gandhi's advocacy that khadi be worn by Indians instead of British-manufactured textiles.

Indira Nehru was taught mostly at home by tutors and attended school intermittently until matriculation in 1934. She was a student at the Modern School in Delhi, St. Cecilia's and St. Mary's Convent schools in Allahabad, the International School of Geneva in Geneva, the Ecole Nouvelle in Bex in Vaud, Switzerland, and the Pupils' Own School in Poona in Maharashtra and in Bombay, which is affiliated with the University of Mumbai. She and her mother moved to the Belur Math headquarters of the Ramakrishna Mission where Swami Ranganathananda was her guardian. Indira then studied at the Vishwa Bharati in Santiniketan, which became Visva-Bharati University in 1951. During an interview with Rabindranath Tagore, he named Indira Priyadarshini, which means "looking at everything with kindness" in Sanskrit and she became known as Indira Priyadarshini Nehru. A year later, however, she had to leave university to attend to her ailing mother in Lausanne, Switzerland. There it was decided that Indira would continue her education at the University of Oxford. After her mother died, Indira attended the Badminton School in Bristol, England for a short time period and then enrolled at Somerville College in Oxford in 1937 to study history. She had to take the entrance examination twice, having failed at her first attempt with a poor performance in Latin. At Oxford, she excelled in history, political science, and economics but her grades in Latin—a compulsory subject—remained poor. However she was active socially at the university and was a member of the Oxford Majlis Asian Society.

During her time in Europe, Indira Nehru was plagued with ill health and was constantly attended to by doctors. She had to make repeated trips to Switzerland to recover, disrupting her studies. She was there in 1940, when Germany rapidly conquered Europe. Nehru tried to return to England through Portugal but was left stranded for nearly two months. She managed to enter England in early 1941, and from there returned to India without completing her studies at Oxford. The university later awarded her an honorary degree. In 2010, Oxford honoured her further by selecting her as one of the ten Oxasians, illustrious Asian graduates from the University of Oxford. During her stay in Britain, Nehru frequently met her future husband Feroze Gandhi (no relation to Mahatma Gandhi). In March 1942 they were married in Allahabad according to Adi Dharm rituals, although Feroze belonged to a Zoroastrian Parsi family of Gujarat. The couple had two sons, Rajiv Gandhi (born 1944) and Sanjay Gandhi (born 1946).

In September 1942, Indira Gandhi was arrested over her role in the Quit India Movement. She was released from jail in April 1943. "Mud entered our souls in the drabness of prison," she later recalled her time in the jail. She added, "When I came out, it was such a shock to see colors again I thought I would go out of my mind."

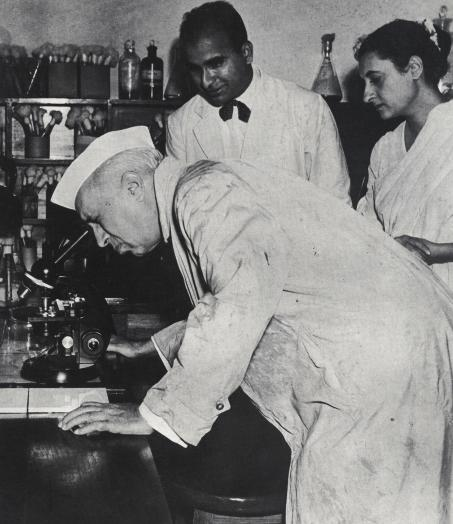
Indira Gandhi and her father, Nehru at an antibiotics manufacturing facility, Poona, 1956.

In the 1950s, Indira, now Indira Gandhi after her marriage, unofficially served her father as a personal assistant during his tenure as the first prime minister of India. Near the end of the 1950s, Gandhi served as the president of the Congress. In that capacity, she was instrumental in having the communist-led Kerala state government dismissed in 1959. That government was India's first elected communist government. After her father's death in 1964 she was appointed a member of the Rajya Sabha (upper house) and served in Prime Minister Lal Bahadur Shastri's cabinet as Minister of Information and Broadcasting. In January 1966, after Shastri's death, the Congress legislative party elected her over Morarji Desai as their leader. Congress party veteran K. Kamaraj was instrumental in Gandhi achieving victory. Because she was a woman, other political leaders in India saw Gandhi as weak and hoped to use her as a puppet once elected:

Congress President Kamaraj orchestrated Mrs. Gandhi's selection as prime minister because he perceived her to be weak enough that he and the other regional party bosses could control her, and yet strong enough to beat Desai [her political opponent] in a party election because of the high regard for her father... a woman would be an ideal tool for the Syndicate.

== Primary years (1966–1984) ==
Gandhi's first eleven years serving as prime minister saw her evolve from the perception of Congress party leaders as their puppet, to a strong leader with the iron resolve to split the party over her policy positions, or to go to war with Pakistan to assist Bangladesh in the 1971 liberation war. At the end of 1977, she was such a dominating figure in Indian politics that Congress party president D. K. Barooah had coined the phrase "India is Indira and Indira is India."

=== First Term (1966–1967) ===
Gandhi formed her government as the Rajya Sabha member from Uttar Pradesh. She was the first indian prime minister from the Rajya Sabha. At the beginning of her first term as prime minister, she was widely criticised by the media and the opposition as the "Goongi goodiya" (Hindi for a "dumb doll") of the Congress party bosses who had orchestrated her election and then tried to constrain her. Indira was a reluctant successor to her famous father, although she had accompanied him on several official foreign visits and played a key role in bringing down the first democratically elected communist government in Kerala. According to certain sources it was the socialist leader Ram Manohar Lohia that first derided her as the "Goongi Goodiya", and it was later echoed by other Congress politicians who were wary of her rise in the party.

One of her first major actions was to crush the separatist Mizo National Front uprising in Mizoram in 1966.

=== Second Term (1967–1971) ===
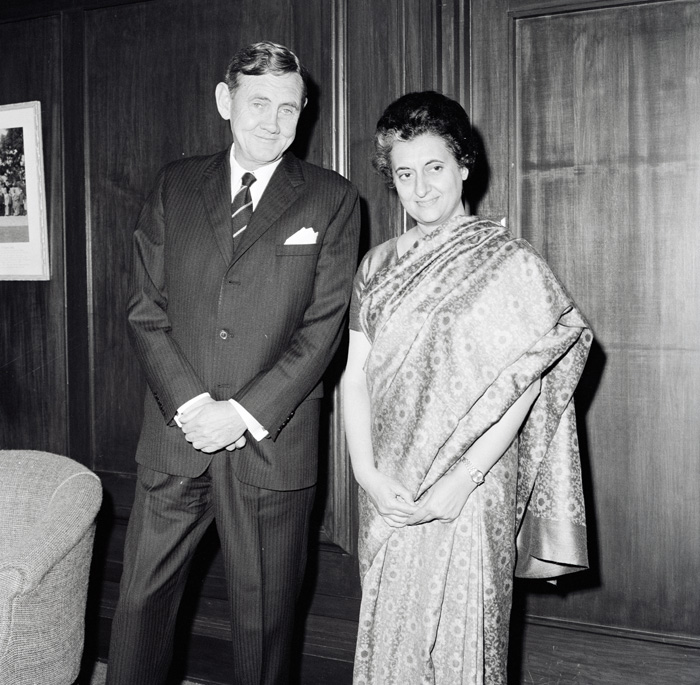
Indira Gandhi with Australian Prime Minister John Gorton in 1968

The first electoral test for Gandhi was the 1967 general elections for the Lok Sabha and state assemblies. The Congress Party won a reduced majority in the Lok Sabha owing to widespread disenchantment over the rising prices of commodities, unemployment, economic stagnation and a food crisis. Gandhi was elected to the Lok Sabha from the Raebareli constituency. She had a rocky start after agreeing to devalue the rupee, which created hardship for Indian businesses and consumers. The importation of wheat from the United States fell through due to political disputes.

For the first time, the party also lost power or lost its majority in a number of states across the country. After the 1967 elections, Gandhi gradually began to move towards socialist policies. In 1969, she fell out with senior Congress party leaders over several issues. Chief among them was her decision to support V. V. Giri, an independent candidate, rather than the official Congress party candidate, Neelam Sanjiva Reddy, for the vacant position of president of India. The other was her announcement that the banks would be nationalised without consulting the finance minister, Morarji Desai. These steps culminated in party president S. Nijalingappa expelling her from the party for indiscipline. Gandhi, in turn, floated her own faction of the Congress party and managed to retain most of the Congress MPs on her side, with only 65 on the side of the Congress (O) faction. The Gandhi faction, called Congress (R), lost its majority in the parliament but remained in power with the support of regional parties such as DMK. The policies of the Congress under Gandhi, before the 1971 elections, also included proposals for the abolition of the Privy Purse to former rulers of the princely states. In 1969, the fourteen largest banks in India were nationalised.

==== Military conflict with China ====
In 1967, a military conflict alongside the border of the Himalayan Kingdom of Sikkim, then an Indian protectorate, broke out between India and China. India won by repelling Chinese attacks and forced the subsequent withdrawal of Chinese forces from the region. Throughout the conflict, the Indian losses were 88 killed and 163 wounded while Chinese casualties stood at 340 killed and 450 wounded, according to the Indian Defense Ministry. Chinese sources made no declarations of casualties but alleged India to be the aggressor.

In December 1967, Indira Gandhi remarked these developments that "China continues to maintain an attitude of hostility towards us and spares no opportunity to malign us and to carry on anti-Indian propaganda not only against the Indian Government but the whole way of our democratic functioning." In 1975, Gandhi incorporated Sikkim into India, after a referendum in which a majority of Sikkimese voted to join India. The move was condemned as being a "despicable act of the Indian Government" by China. Chinese government mouthpiece China Daily wrote that "the Nehrus, father and daughter, had always acted in this way, and Indira Gandhi had gone further".

=== Third Term (1971–1977) ===
Garibi Hatao (Remove Poverty) was the resonant theme for Gandhi's 1971 political bid. The slogan was developed in response to the combined opposition alliance's use of the two-word manifesto—"Indira Hatao" (Remove Indira). The Garibi Hatao slogan and the proposed anti-poverty programs that came with it were designed to give Gandhi independent national support, based on the rural and urban poor. This would allow her to bypass the dominant rural castes both in and of state and local governments as well as the urban commercial class. For their part, the previously voiceless poor would at last gain both political worth and political weight. The programs created through Garibi Hatao, though carried out locally, were funded and developed by the Central Government in New Delhi. The program was supervised and staffed by the Indian National Congress party. "These programs also provided the central political leadership with new and vast patronage resources to be disbursed ... throughout the country."

The Congress government faced numerous problems during this term. Some of these were due to high inflation which in turn was caused by wartime expenses, drought in some parts of the country and, more importantly, the 1973 oil crisis. Opposition to her in the 1973–75 period, after the Gandhi wave had receded, was strongest in the states of Bihar and Gujarat. In Bihar, Jayaprakash Narayan, the veteran leader came out of retirement to lead the protest movement there.

==== War with Pakistan ====
Gandhi's biggest achievement following the 1971 election came in December 1971 with India's decisive victory over Pakistan in the India–Pakistan war of 1971. That victory occurred in the last two weeks of the Bangladesh Liberation War, which led to the formation of independent Bangladesh. An insurgency in East Pakistan (now Bangladesh) formed in early 1971, with Bengalis and East Pakistanis revolting against authoritarian rule from the central West Pakistan Government. In response, Pakistani security forces launched the infamous Operation Searchlight, in which Pakistan committed genocide among Bengali Hindus, nationalists and intelligentsia. Gandhi's India was initially restrained from intervening in the insurgency but quickly started to support Bengali rebels through the provision of military supplies. Indian forces clashed multiple times with Pakistani forces in the Eastern border. At one point, Indian forces along with Mukti Bahini rebels allied together and attacked Pakistani forces at Dhalai. The attack, supported and later successfully executed by India, was done to stop Pakistani cross-border shelling. The battle occurred more than a month before India's official intervention in December. Gandhi quickly dispatched more troops to the Eastern border with East Pakistan, hoping to support Mukti Bahini rebels and cease any Pakistani infiltration. Indian forces then clashed again with Pakistani forces after Indian forces crossed the border and secured Garibpur after a one-day battle lasting from 20 November 1971 to the 21st. The next day, on 22 November, Indian and Pakistani aircraft engaged in a dogfight over the Boyra Salient, in which thousands of people watched as four Indian Folland Gnats shot down two Pakistani Canadair Sabres and damaged another. Both Pakistani pilots that were shot down were captured as prisoners of war. The Battle of Boyra instantly made the four Indian pilots celebrities and created large-scale nationalism as the Bangladesh Liberation War saw more and more Indian intervention and escalation. Other clashes also happened on the same day but did not receive as much media attention as did the battle of Boyra and Garibpur. On 3 December 1971, the Pakistan Air Force launched Operation Chengiz Khan, which saw Pakistani aircraft attacking Indian airbases and military installations across the Western border in a pre-emptive strike. The initial night-time attack by Pakistani forces was foiled, failing to inflict any major damage on Indian airbases, allowing Indian aircraft to counterattack into West Pakistan. Gandhi quickly declared a state of emergency and addressed the nation on radio shortly after midnight, stating: "We must be prepared for a long period of hardship and sacrifice."

Both countries mobilised for war and Gandhi ordered full-out war, ordering an invasion into East Pakistan. Pakistan's navy had not improved since the 1965 war, while the Pakistani airforce could not launch attacks on the same scale as the Indian airforce. The Pakistan Army quickly attempted major land operations on the Western border, but most of these attacks besides some in Kashmir stalled, and allowed Indian counterattacks to gain land. Pakistan's army lacked wide-scale organisation, contributing to miscommunication and high casualties in the western front.

In the eastern front of the war, Indian generals opted for a lightning war, using mechanised and airborne units to quickly bypass Pakistani opposition and advance rapidly towards the capital of East Pakistan, Dhaka. Jagjit Singh Aurora led the Indian army's Eastern Command. The Indian air force quickly overcame the small contingent of Pakistani aircraft in East Pakistan, achieving air superiority. Indian forces liberated Jessore and several other towns during the Battle of Sylhet between 7 and 15 December 1971, which saw India conduct its first heliborne operation. India then conducted another airdrop on 9 December, with Indian forces led by Major General Sagat Singh capturing just under 5,000 Pakistani POWs and also crossing the Meghna River towards Dhaka. Two days later, Indian forces conducted the largest airborne operation since World War II. 750 men of the Parachute Regiment landed in Tangail, defeating Pakistani forces and securing a direct route to Dhaka. Few Pakistani soldiers escaped the battle, with only 900 out of 7000 soldiers successfully retreating to Dhaka. By 12 December, Indian forces reached the outskirts of Dhaka and prepared to besiege the capital. Indian heavy artillery arrived by the 14th, and shelled the city.

As surrender became apparent by 14 December 1971, Pakistani paramilitaries and militia roamed the streets of Dhaka during the night, kidnapping, torturing and then executing any educated Bengali who was viewed as someone who could lead Bangladesh once Pakistan surrendered. Over 200 of these people were killed on the 14th. By 16 December, Pakistani morale had reached a low point, with the Indian Army finally encircling Dhaka and besieging the city. On the 16th, Indian forces issued a 30-minute ultimatum for the city to surrender. Seeing that the city's defences paled in comparison to the Mukti Bahini and Indian forces outside the city, Lt-Gen. A.A.K. Niazi (Cdr. of Eastern Command) and his deputy, V-Adm. M.S. Khan surrendered the city without resistance. BBC News captured the moment of surrender as Indian soldiers from the Parachute Regiment streamed into the city. As Indian forces and Mukti Bahini rounded up the remaining Pakistani forces, Lieutenant General Jagjit Singh Aurora of India and A.A.K. Niazi of Pakistan signed the Pakistani Instrument of Surrender at 16:31Hrs IST on 16 December 1971. The surrender signified the collapse of the East Pakistan Government along with the end of the war. 93,000 soldiers of the Pakistani security forces surrendered, the largest surrender since World War II. The entire four-tiered military surrendered to India along with its officers and generals. Large crowds flooded the scenes as anti-Pakistani slogans emerged and Pakistani POWs were beaten by the locals. Eventually, Indian officers formed a human-chain to protect Pakistani POWs and Niazi from being lynched by the belligerent locals. Most of the 93,000 captured were Pakistan Army officers or paramilitary officers, along with 12,000 supporters (razakars). Hostilities officially ended on 17 December 1971. 8,000 Pakistani soldiers were killed along with 25,000 wounded; Indian forces suffered only 3,000 dead and 12,000 wounded. India claimed to have captured 3.6k square kilometres of Pakistani land on the Western Front while losing 126 square kilometres of land to Pakistan.

Gandhi was hailed as Goddess Durga by the people as well as the opposition leaders at the time when India defeated Pakistan in the war. In the elections held for State assemblies across India in March 1972, the Congress (R) swept to power in most states riding on the post-war "Indira wave".

==== Verdict on electoral malpractice ====
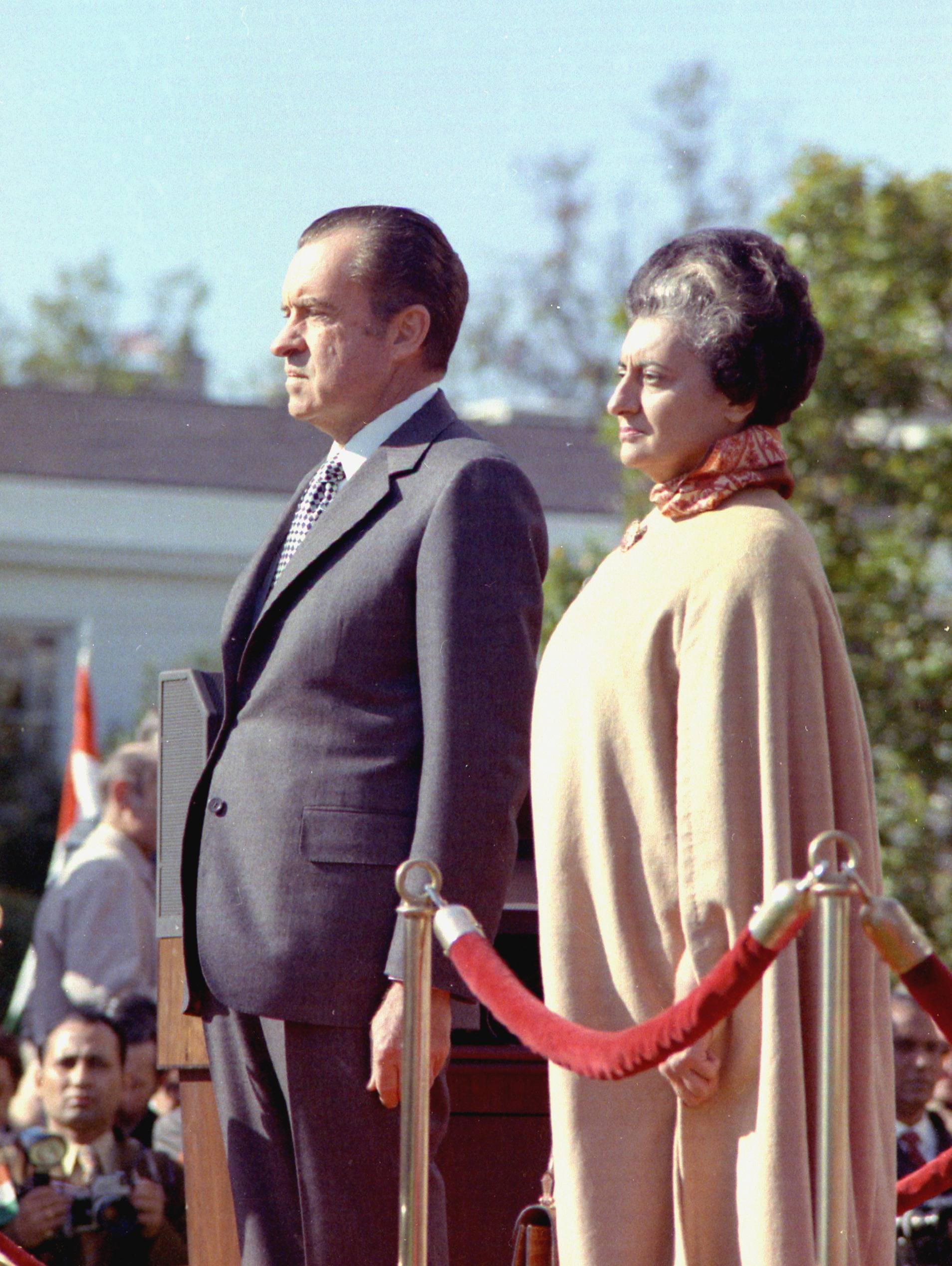
Gandhi with U.S. President Richard Nixon, 1971

On 12 June 1975, the Allahabad High Court declared Indira Gandhi's election to the Lok Sabha in 1971 void on the grounds of electoral malpractice. In an election petition filed by her 1971 opponent, Raj Narain (who later defeated her in the 1977 parliamentary election running in the Raebareli constituency), alleged several major as well as minor instances of the use of government resources for campaigning. Gandhi had asked one of her colleagues in government, Ashoke Kumar Sen, to defend her in court. She gave evidence in her defence during the trial. After almost four years, the court found her guilty of dishonest election practices, excessive election expenditure, and of using government machinery and officials for party purposes. The judge, however, rejected the more serious charges of bribery, laid against her in the case.

The court ordered her stripped of her parliamentary seat and banned her from running for any office for six years. As the constitution requires that the Prime Minister must be a member of either the Lok Sabha or the Rajya Sabha, the two houses of the Parliament of India, she was effectively removed from office. However, Gandhi rejected calls to resign. She announced plans to appeal to the Supreme Court and insisted that the conviction did not undermine her position. She said, "There is a lot of talk about our government not being clean, but from our experience the situation was very much worse when [opposition] parties were forming governments." She dismissed criticism of the way her Congress Party raised election campaign money, saying all parties used the same methods. The prime minister retained the support of her party, which issued a statement backing her.

After news of the verdict spread, hundreds of supporters demonstrated outside her house, pledging their loyalty. Indian High Commissioner to the United Kingdom Braj Kumar Nehru said Gandhi's conviction would not harm her political career. "Mrs Gandhi has still today overwhelming support in the country," he said. "I believe the prime minister of India will continue in office until the electorate of India decides otherwise". According to her daughter in law Sonia's Belonging: A Journey of Love, Rajiv Gandhi, her elder son (who later succeeded her upon her assaination) who was then working as a commercial pilot and not deeply involved in politics—advised Indira to resign after the Allahabad High Court invalidated her election, suggesting that elections were six months away and would "clear the air".

==== State of Emergency (1975–1977) ====
Gandhi moved to restore order by ordering the arrest of most of the opposition participating in the unrest. Her Cabinet and government recommended that then President Fakhruddin Ali Ahmed declare a state of emergency because of the disorder and lawlessness following the Allahabad High Court decision. Accordingly, Ahmed declared a State of Emergency caused by internal disorder, based on the provisions of Article 352(1) of the Constitution, on 25 June 1975. At the time of emergency, there was a widespread rumour that Gandhi had ordered her search guards to eliminate firebrand trade unionist and socialist party leader George Fernandes, while he was on a run. Few International organisations and Government officials issued request letters to Indira Gandhi pleading her to relinquish such decrees. Fernandes had called a nationwide railway strike in 1974, that shut the railways for three weeks and became the largest industrial action in Asia. Gandhi had turned furious over him and the strike was massively cracked down.

==== Rule by decree ====
Within a few months, President's rule was imposed on the two opposition-party-ruled states of Gujarat and Tamil Nadu, thereby bringing the entire country under direct Central rule or under the rule of governments led by the Congress party. Police were granted powers to impose curfews and detain citizens indefinitely, and all publications were subjected to substantial censorship by the Ministry of Information and Broadcasting. Finally, the impending legislative assembly elections were postponed indefinitely, with all opposition-controlled state governments being removed by virtue of the constitutional provision allowing for a dismissal of a state government on the recommendation of the state's governor.

Indira Gandhi used the emergency provisions to change conflicting party members:

Unlike her father Jawaharlal Nehru who preferred to deal with strong chief ministers in control of their legislative parties and state party organizations, Mrs. Gandhi set out to remove every Congress chief minister who had an independent base and to replace each of them with ministers personally loyal to her...Even so, stability could not be maintained in the states...

President Ahmed issued ordinances that did not require debate in the Parliament, allowing Gandhi to rule by decree.

==== Rise of Sanjay Gandhi ====
During the emergency Gandhi's younger son, Sanjay Gandhi, entered into Indian politics. He wielded tremendous power during the emergency without holding any government office. According to Mark Tully, "His inexperience did not stop him from using the Draconian powers his mother, Indira Gandhi, had taken to terrorise the administration, setting up what was in effect a police state." It was said that during the emergency Sanjay virtually ran India along with his friends, especially Bansi Lal. It was also quipped that Sanjay had total control over his mother and that the government was run by the PMH (Prime Minister House) rather than the PMO (Prime Minister Office).

=== In opposition (1977–1980) ===
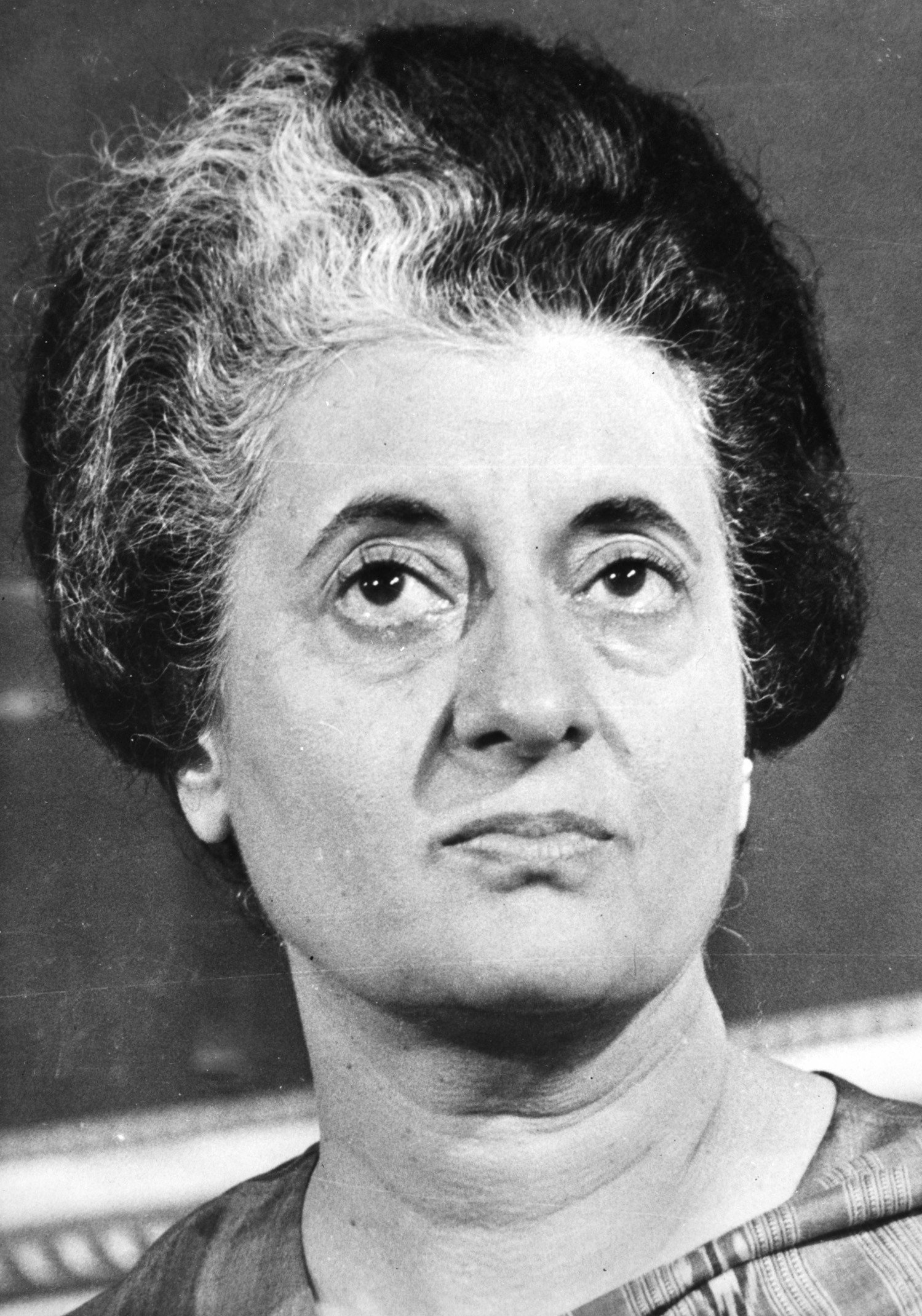
Gandhi in 1977

In 1977, after extending the state of emergency twice, Indira Gandhi called elections to give the electorate a chance to vindicate her rule. She may have grossly misjudged her popularity by reading what the heavily censored press wrote about her. She was opposed by the Janata alliance of Opposition parties. The alliance was made up of Bharatiya Jana Sangh, Congress (O), The Socialist parties, and Charan Singh's Bharatiya Kranti Dal representing northern peasants and farmers. The Janata alliance, with Jai Prakash Narayan as its spiritual guide, claimed the elections were the last chance for India to choose between "democracy and dictatorship". The Congress Party split during the election campaign of 1977; veteran Gandhi supporters like Jagjivan Ram, Hemvati Nandan Bahuguna, and Nandini Satpathy were compelled to part ways and form a new political entity, the CFD (Congress for Democracy) due primarily to intra-party politicking and the circumstances created by Sanjay Gandhi. The prevailing rumour was that he intended to dislodge Indira Gandhi, and the trio stood to prevent that. The Gandhi's Congress party was soundly crushed in the elections. The Janata Party's democracy or dictatorship claim seemed to resonate with the public. Indira Gandhi lost in her former constieuncy Raebareli to Raj Narain who filed election fraud case against her. Her son Sanjay Gandhi lost his electoral debut in Amethi, and Congress was reduced to 153 seats (compared with 350 in the previous Lok Sabha), 92 of which were in the South. The Janata alliance, under the leadership of Morarji Desai, came to power after the State of Emergency was lifted. The alliance parties later merged to form the Janata Party under the guidance of Gandhian leader, Jayaprakash Narayan. The other leaders of the Janata Party were Charan Singh, Raj Narain, George Fernandes, and Atal Bihari Vajpayee.

After the humiliating defeat in the election, the king of Nepal, through an intermediatory offered to move her and her family to Nepal. She refused to shift herself, but was open to move her two sons Sanjay Gandhi and Rajiv Gandhi. However, after consulting with Kao, she declined the offer altogether keeping in view of her future political career.

==== In opposition and return to power ====
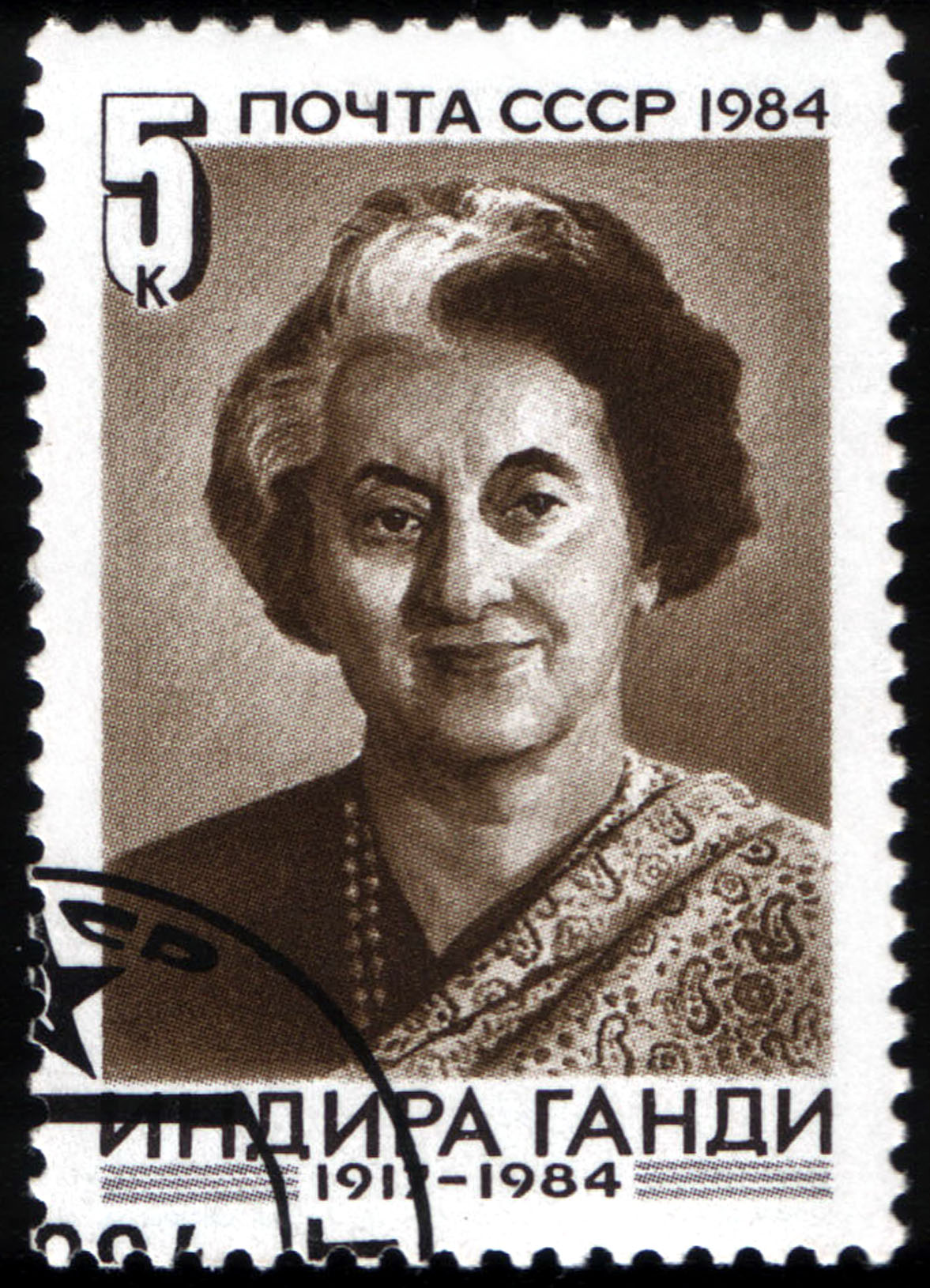
1984 USSR commemorative stamp

Since Indira Gandhi had lost her seat in the election, the defeated Congress party appointed Yashwantrao Chavan as their parliamentary party leader. Soon afterwards, the Congress party split again with Gandhi floating her own Congress faction called Congress(I) where I stood for Indira. She won a by-election in the Chikmagalur Constituency and took a seat in the Lok Sabha in November 1978 However, the Janata government's home minister, Charan Singh, ordered her arrest along with Sanjay Gandhi on several charges, none of which would be easy to prove in an Indian court. The arrest meant that Gandhi was automatically expelled from Lok Sabha. The allegations included that she "had planned or thought of killing all opposition leaders in jail during the Emergency". However, the strategy backfired disastrously. In response to her arrest, Gandhi's supporters hijacked an Indian Airlines jet and demanded her immediate release. Her arrest and long-running trial gained her sympathy from many people. The Janata coalition was only united by its hatred of Gandhi (or "that woman" as some called her). The party included right wing Hindu Nationalists, Socialists, and former Congress party members. With so little in common, the Morarji Desai government was bogged down by infighting. In 1979, the government began to unravel over the issue of the dual loyalties of some members to Janata and the Rashtriya Swayamsevak Sangh (RSS)—the Hindu nationalist, paramilitary organisation. The ambitious Union finance minister, Charan Singh, who as the Union home minister during the previous year had ordered the Gandhi's' arrests, took advantage of this and started courting Indira and Sanjay. After a significant exodus from the party to Singh's faction, Desai resigned in July 1979. Singh was appointed prime minister, by President Reddy, after Indira Gandhi and Sanjay Gandhi promised Singh that Congress (I) would support his government from outside on certain conditions. The conditions included dropping all charges against Indira and Sanjay. Since Singh refused to drop them, Congress (I) withdrew its support and President Reddy dissolved Parliament in August 1979.

Before the 1980 elections Indira Gandhi approached the Shahi Imam of Jama Masjid at the time, Syed Abdullah Bukhari and entered into an agreement with him on the basis of 10-point programme to secure the support of the Muslim votes. In the elections held in January, Congress (I) under Gandhi's leadership returned to power with a landslide majority.

=== Fourth Term (1980–1984) ===
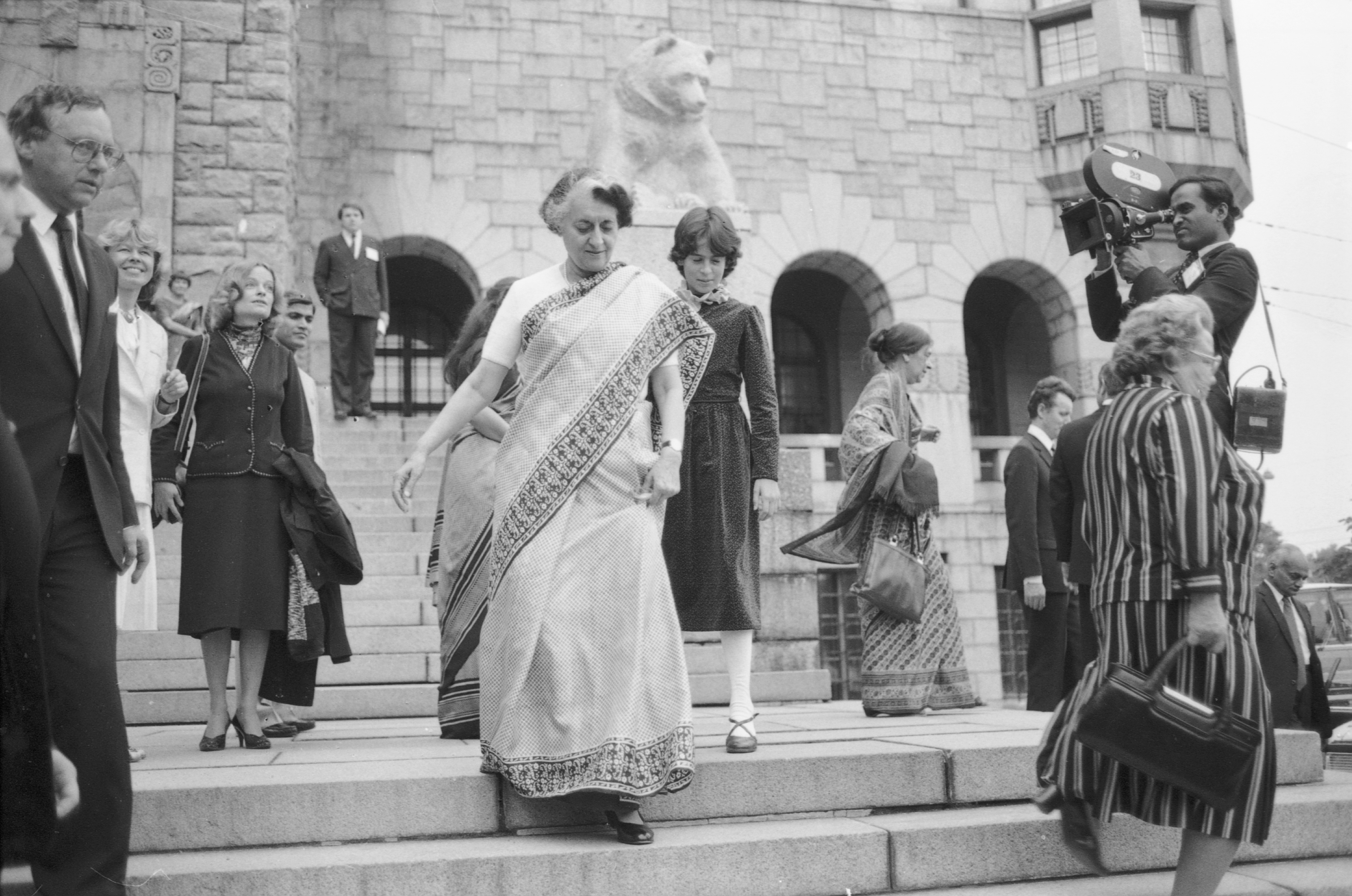
Gandhi on the stairs of the National Museum in Helsinki, Finland on 10 June 1983

The Congress Party under Gandhi swept back into power in January 1980. In this election, Gandhi was elected by the voters of the Medak constituency. On 23 June, Sanjay Gandhi was killed in a plane crash while performing an aerobatic manoeuvre in New Delhi. In 1980, as a tribute to her son's dream of launching an indigenously manufactured car, Indira Gandhi nationalised Sanjay's debt-ridden company, Maruti Udyog, for Rs. 43,000,000 (4.34 crore) and invited joint venture bids from automobile companies around the world. Suzuki of Japan was selected as the partner. The company launched its first Indian-manufactured car in 1984.

By the time of Sanjay's death, Indira Gandhi trusted only family members, and therefore persuaded her reluctant son, Rajiv, to enter politics. Her PMO office staff included H. Y. Sharada Prasad as her information adviser and speechwriter.

At the 7th Summit of the Non-Aligned Movement, held in New Delhi in 1983, Gandhi assumed the three-year chairmanship of the organisation, succeeding Fidel Castro.

=== Operation Blue Star ===
After the 1977 elections, a coalition led by the Sikh-majority Akali Dal came to power in the northern Indian state of Punjab. In an effort to split the Akali Dal and gain popular support among the Sikhs, Gandhi's Congress Party helped to bring the orthodox religious leader Jarnail Singh Bhindranwale to prominence in Punjab politics. Later, Bhindranwale's organisation, Damdami Taksal, became embroiled in violence with another religious sect called the Sant Nirankari Mission and he was accused of instigating the murder of Jagat Narain, the owner of the Punjab Kesari newspaper. After being arrested, Bhindranwale disassociated himself from the Congress Party and joined Akali Dal. In July 1982, he led the campaign for the implementation of the Anandpur Resolution, which demanded greater autonomy for the Sikh-majority state. Meanwhile, a small group of Sikhs, including some of Bhindranwale's followers, turned to militancy after being targeted by government officials and police for supporting the Anandpur Resolution. In 1982, Bhindranwale and approximately 200 armed followers moved into a guest house called the Guru Nanak Niwas near the Golden Temple.

By 1983, the Temple complex had become a fort for many militants. The Statesman later reported that light machine guns and semi-automatic rifles were known to have been brought into the compound. On 23 April 1983, the Punjab Police Deputy Inspector General A. S. Atwal was shot dead as he left the Temple compound. The next day, Harchand Singh Longowal (then president of Akali Dal) confirmed the involvement of Bhindranwale in the murder. After several futile negotiations, in June 1984, Gandhi ordered the Indian army to enter the Golden Temple to remove Bhindranwale and his supporters from the complex. The army used heavy artillery, including tanks, in the action code-named Operation Blue Star. The operation badly damaged or destroyed parts of the Temple complex, including the Akal Takht shrine and the Sikh library. It led to the deaths of many Sikh fighters and innocent pilgrims. The number of casualties remains disputed, with estimates ranging from many hundreds to many thousands.

Gandhi was accused of using the attack for political ends. Harjinder Singh Dilgeer stated that she attacked the temple complex to present herself as a great hero in order to win the general elections planned towards the end of 1984. There was fierce criticism of the action by Sikhs in India and overseas. There were also incidents of mutiny by Sikh soldiers in the aftermath of the attack.

== Assassination ==
Shakti Sthal, the place where Indira Gandhi was cremated at New Delhi

"I am alive today, I may not be there tomorrow ... I shall continue to serve until my last breath and when I die, I can say, that every drop of my blood will invigorate India and strengthen it ... Even if I died in the service of the nation, I would be proud of it. Every drop of my blood ... will contribute to the growth of this nation and to make it strong and dynamic."

— Gandhi's remarks on her last speech a day before her death (30 October 1984) at the then Parade Ground, Odisha.

On 31 October 1984, two of Gandhi's Sikh bodyguards, Satwant Singh and Beant Singh, shot her with their service weapons in the garden of the prime minister's residence at 1 Safdarjung Road, New Delhi, allegedly in revenge for Operation Blue Star. The shooting occurred as she was walking past a wicket gate guarded by the two men. She was to be interviewed by the British filmmaker Peter Ustinov, who was filming a documentary for Irish television. Beant shot her three times using his side-arm; Satwant fired 30 rounds. The men dropped their weapons and surrendered. Afterwards, they were taken away by other guards into a closed room where Beant was shot dead. Kehar Singh was later arrested for being part of the conspiracy in the attack. Satwant and Kehar were sentenced to death and hanged in Delhi's Tihar Jail.

Gandhi was taken to the AIIMS Delhi at 9:30 AM where doctors operated on her. She was declared dead at 2:20 PM. The post-mortem examination was conducted by a team of doctors headed by Tirath Das Dogra. Dogra said that Gandhi had sustained as many as 30 bullet wounds from two sources: a Sten submachine gun and a .38 Special revolver. The assailants had fired 31 bullets at her, of which 30 hit her; 23 had passed through her body while seven remained inside her. Dogra extracted bullets to establish the make of the weapons used and to match each weapon with the bullets recovered by ballistic examination. The bullets were matched with their respective weapons at the Central Forensic Science Laboratory (CFSL) Delhi. Subsequently, Dogra appeared in Shri Mahesh Chandra's court as an expert witness (PW-5); he gave his testimony in several sessions. The cross examination was conducted by Shri Pran Nath Lekhi, the defence counsel. Salma Sultan provided the first news of her assassination on Doordarshan's evening news on 31 October 1984, more than 10 hours after she was shot.

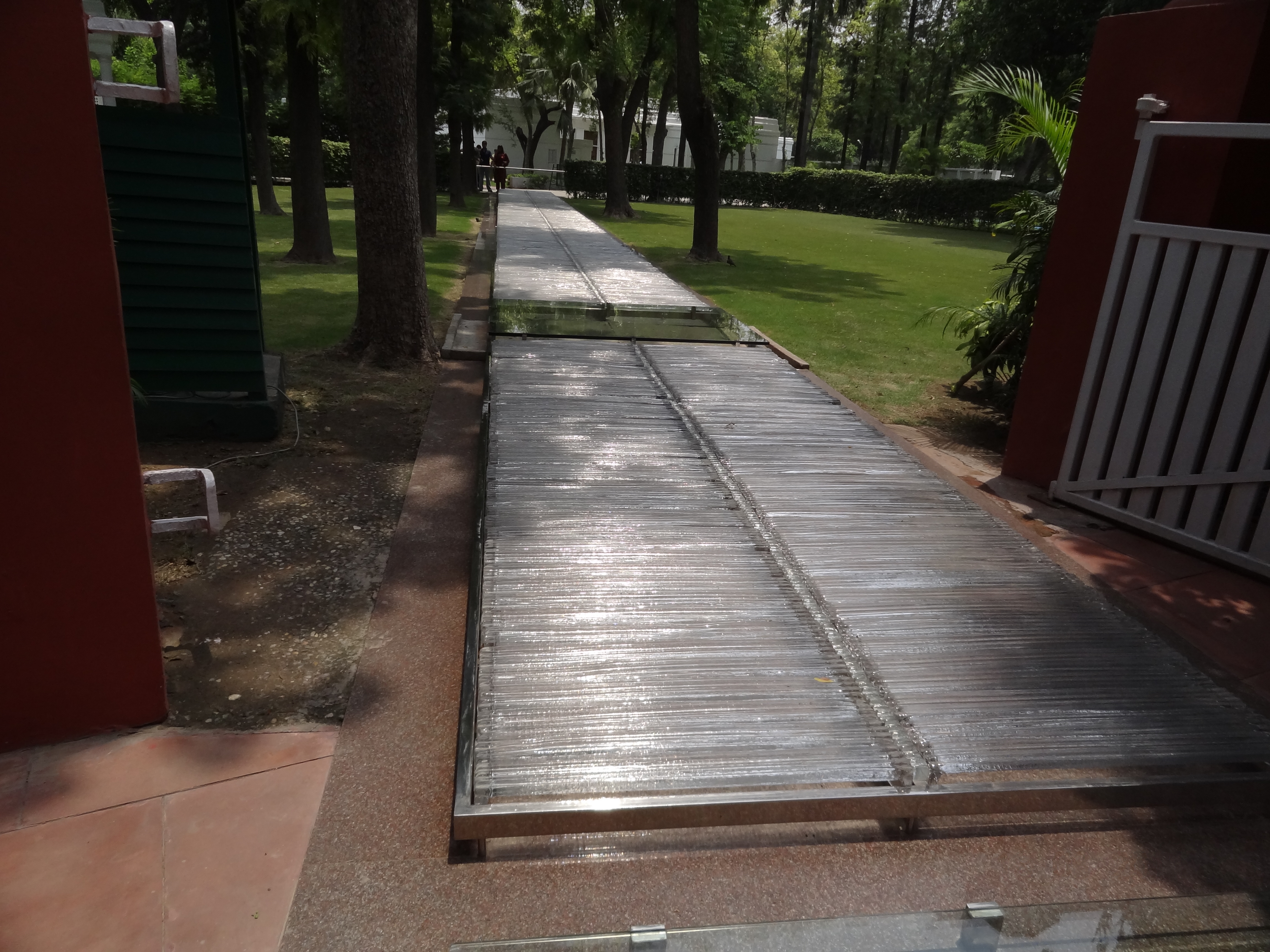
Today, the spot where Gandhi was assassinated is marked by a glass opening in the crystal pathway at the Indira Gandhi Memorial

Gandhi was cremated in accordance with Hindu tradition on 3 November near Raj Ghat. The site where she was cremated is known today as Shakti Sthal. Paying homage, Gandhi's body lay in state at Teen Murti House. Thousands of followers strained for a glimpse of the cremation. Her funeral was televised live on domestic and international stations, including the BBC. After her death, the Parade Ground was converted to the Indira Gandhi Park which was inaugurated by her son, Rajiv Gandhi.

Gandhi's assassination dramatically changed the political landscape. Rajiv succeeded his mother as prime minister within hours of her murder and anti-Sikh riots erupted, lasting for several days and killing more than 3,000 Sikhs in New Delhi and an estimated 8,000 across India. Many Congress leaders were believed to be behind the anti-Sikh massacre.

=== International reaction ===
Gandhi's death was mourned worldwide. World leaders condemned the assassination and said her death would leave a 'big emptiness' in international affairs. In Moscow, Soviet President Konstantin Chernenko sent condolences, "The Soviet people learned with pain and sorrow about the untimely death in a villainous assassination of the glorious daughter of the great Indian people, a fiery fighter for peace and security of peoples and a great friend of the Soviet Union". US President Ronald Reagan, along with Secretary of State George Shultz, visited the Indian Embassy to sign a book of condolences and expressed his 'shock, revulsion, and grief' over the assassination. British Prime Minister Margaret Thatcher stated "I will miss Mrs Indira Gandhi very much indeed", and travelled to New Delhi to attend Gandhi’s funeral. Former vice president Walter Mondale called Gandhi 'a great leader of a great democracy' and deplored 'this shocking act of violence'.

Asian, African, and European leaders mourned Gandhi as a great champion of democracy and leader of the Non-Aligned Movement expressed its 'deepest grief' and called the killing a 'terrorist' act. South Korean President Chun Doo-hwan, said Gandhi's death meant the 'loss of a great leader to the whole world.' Yugoslav President Veselin Đuranović, Pakistani President Mohammad Zia ul-Haq, Italian President Sandro Pertini, Pope John Paul II at the Vatican, and French President François Mitterrand condemned the killing. At the United Nations, the General Assembly paused during its work as shocked delegates mourned the death. Assembly President Paul Lusaka of Zambia postponed a scheduled debate and hastily organised a memorial meeting.

== Foreign policy ==
Gandhi on a visit to Rio de Janeiro, 1968, National Archives of Brazil

Gandhi is remembered for her ability to effectively promote Indian foreign policy measures.

=== South Asia ===
In early 1971, disputed elections in Pakistan led then East Pakistan to declare independence as Bangladesh. Repression and violence by the Pakistani army led to 10 million refugees crossing the border into India over the following months. Finally, in December 1971, Gandhi intervened directly in the conflict to liberate Bangladesh. India emerged victorious following the war with Pakistan to become the dominant power of South Asia. India had signed a treaty with the Soviet Union promising mutual assistance in the case of war, while Pakistan received active support from the United States during the conflict. U.S. President Richard Nixon disliked Gandhi personally, referring to her as a "bitch" and a "clever fox" in his private communication with Secretary of State Henry Kissinger. Nixon later wrote of the war: "[Gandhi] suckered [America]. Suckered us ... this woman suckered us." Relations with the U.S. became distant as Gandhi developed closer ties with the Soviet Union after the war. The latter grew to become India's largest trading partner and its biggest arms supplier for much of Gandhi's premiership. India's new hegemonic position, as articulated under the "Indira Doctrine", led to attempts to bring the Himalayan states under India's sphere of influence. Nepal and Bhutan remained aligned with India, while in 1975, after years of campaigning, Sikkim voted to join India in a referendum.

In order to keep the Soviet Union and the United States out of South Asia, Gandhi was instrumental in establishing the South Asian Association for Regional Cooperation (SAARC) in 1983.

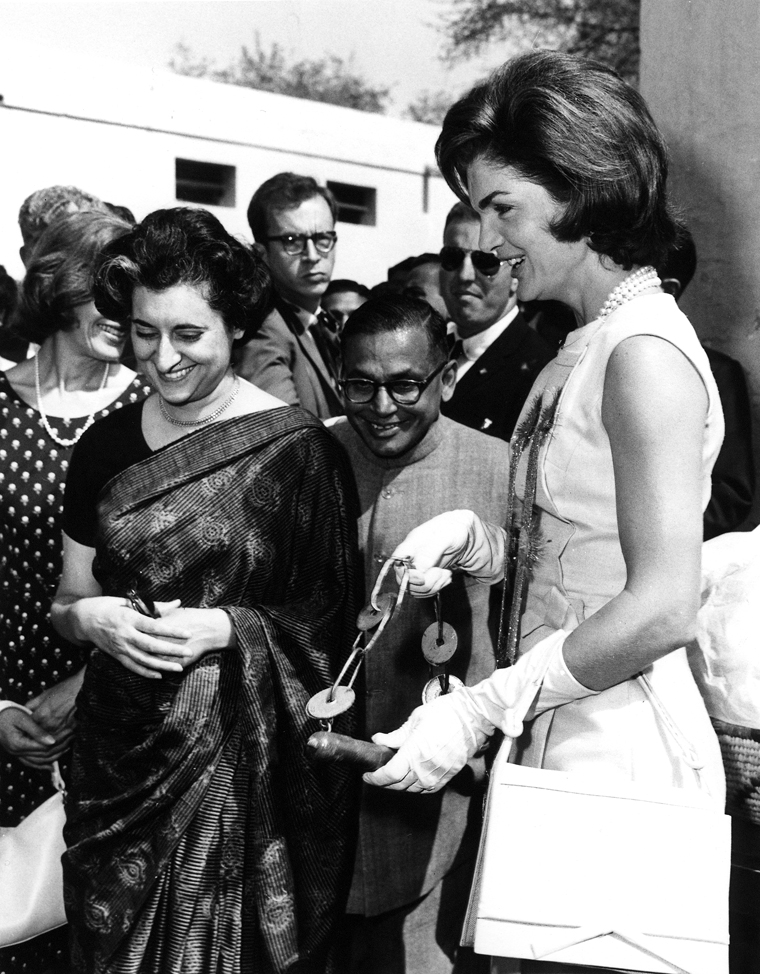
Gandhi with Jacqueline Kennedy, First Lady of the US in New Delhi, 1962

India maintained close ties with neighbouring Bangladesh (formerly East Pakistan) following the Liberation War. Prime Minister Sheikh Mujibur Rahman recognised Gandhi's contributions to the independence of Bangladesh. However, Mujibur Rahman's pro-India policies antagonised many in Bangladeshi politics and the military, which feared that Bangladesh had become a client state of India. The Assassination of Mujibur Rahman in 1975 led to the establishment of Islamist military regimes that sought to distance the country from India. Gandhi's relationship with the military regimes was strained because of her alleged support of anti-Islamist leftist guerrilla forces in Bangladesh. Generally, however, there was a rapprochement between Gandhi and the Bangladeshi regimes, although issues such as border disputes and the Farakka Dam remained an irritant to bilateral ties. In 2011, the Government of Bangladesh conferred its highest state award for non-nationals, the Bangladesh Freedom Honour posthumously on Gandhi for her "outstanding contribution" to the country's independence.

=== Sri Lanka ===
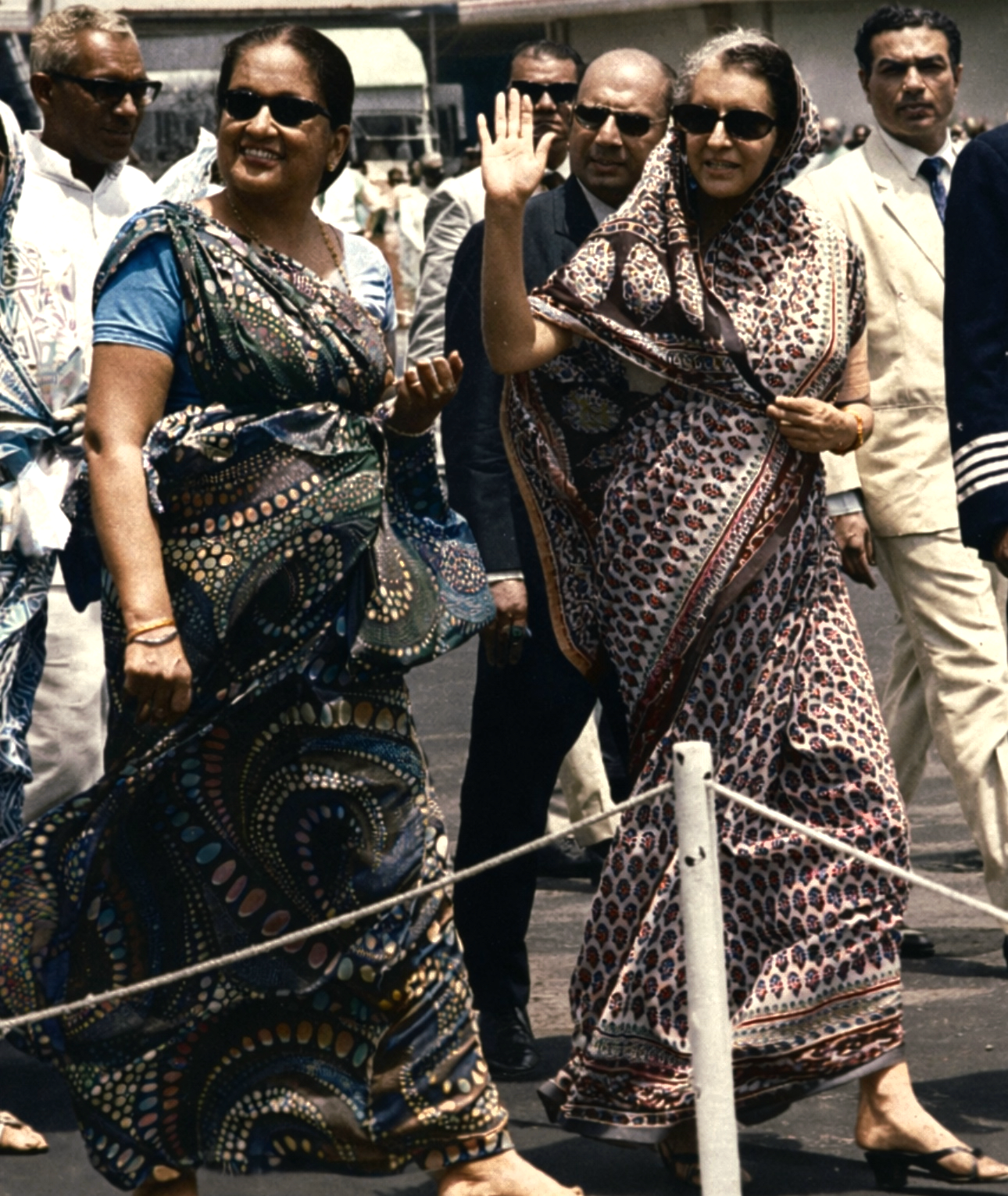
Indira Gandhi meeting with Sirimavo Bandaranaike, 1973

Gandhi's approach to dealing with Sri Lanka's ethnic problems was initially accommodating. She enjoyed cordial and personal relations with Prime Minister Sirimavo Bandaranaike, who was her Sri Lankan counterpart. In 1974, India ceded the tiny islet of Katchatheevu to Sri Lanka to save Bandaranaike's socialist government from a political disaster. However, relations soured over Sri Lanka's movement away from socialism under J. R. Jayewardene, whom Gandhi despised as a "western puppet". India under Gandhi was alleged to have supported the Liberation Tigers of Tamil Eelam (LTTE) militants in the 1980s to put pressure on Jayewardene to abide by Indian interests. Nevertheless, Gandhi rejected demands to invade Sri Lanka in the aftermath of Black July 1983, an anti-Tamil pogrom carried out by Sinhalese mobs. Gandhi made a statement emphasising that she stood for the territorial integrity of Sri Lanka, although she also stated that India cannot "remain a silent spectator to any injustice done to the Tamil community."

=== Pakistan ===
India's relationship with Pakistan remained strained after the Simla Agreement in 1972. Gandhi's authorisation of the detonation of a nuclear device at Pokhran in 1974 was viewed by Pakistani leader Zulfikar Ali Bhutto as an attempt to intimidate Pakistan into accepting India's hegemony in the subcontinent. However, in May 1976, she and Bhutto both agreed to reopen diplomatic establishments and normalise relations. After General Muhammad Zia-ul-Haq rose to power in Pakistan in 1978, India's relations with its neighbour reached a nadir. Gandhi accused General Zia of supporting Khalistani militants in Punjab. Military hostilities recommenced in 1984 following Gandhi's authorisation of Operation Meghdoot. India was victorious in the resulting Siachen conflict against Pakistan.

=== Middle East ===
Gandhi remained a staunch supporter of the Palestinians in the Arab–Israeli conflict and was critical of the Middle East diplomacy sponsored by the United States. Israel was viewed as a religious state, and thus an analogue to India's archrival Pakistan. Indian diplomats hoped to win Arab support in countering Pakistan in Kashmir. Nevertheless, Gandhi authorised the development of a secret channel of contact and security assistance with Israel in the late 1960s. Her lieutenant, P. V. Narasimha Rao, later became prime minister and approved full diplomatic ties with Israel in 1992.

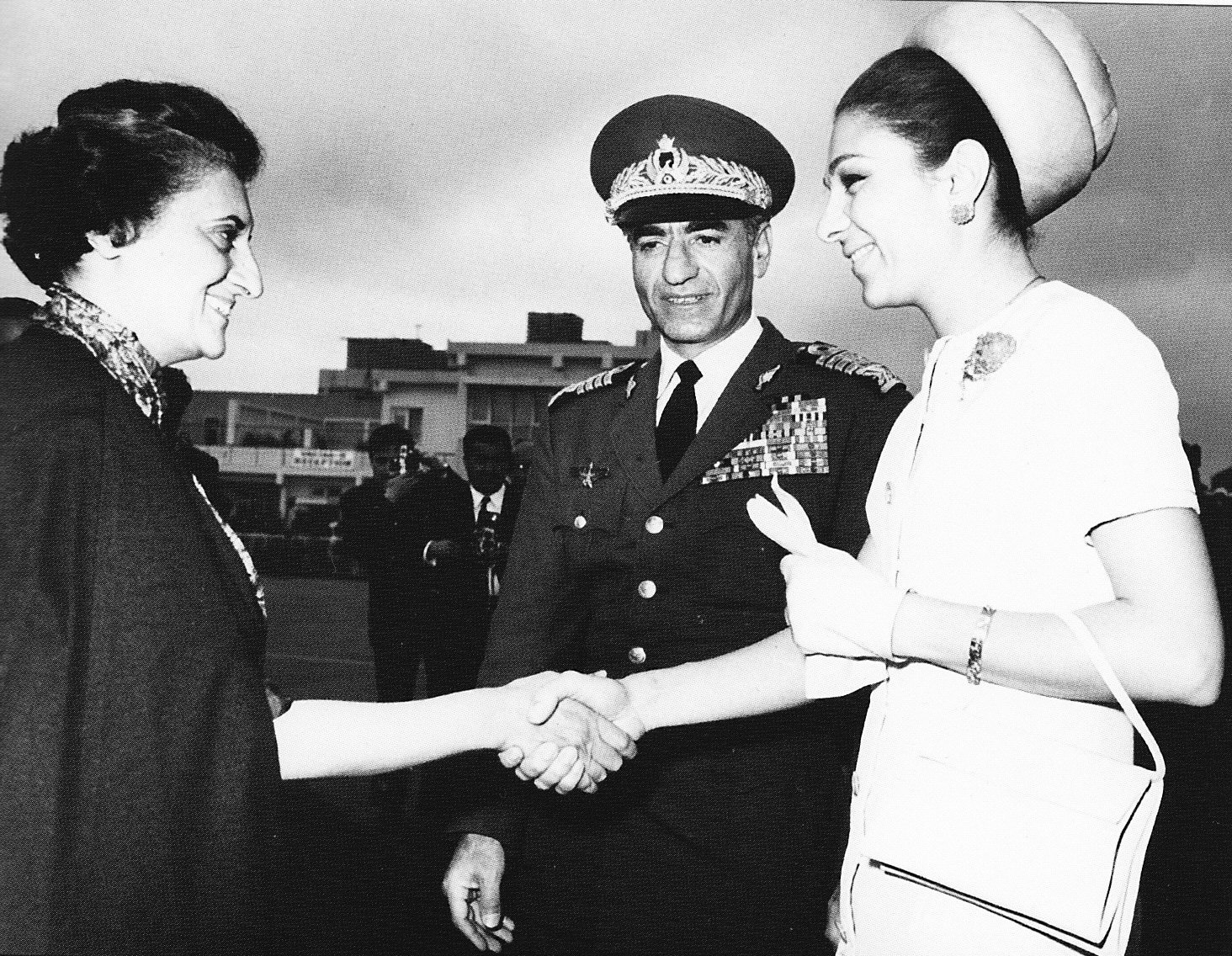
Gandhi meeting the Shah of Iran Mohammad Reza Pahlavi and Shahbanu Farah Pahlavi during their state visit to India in 1970

India's pro-Arab policy had mixed success. Establishment of close ties with the socialist and secular Baathist regimes to some extent neutralised Pakistani propaganda against India. However, the Indo-Pakistani War of 1971 presented a dilemma for the Arab and Muslim states of the Middle East as the war was fought by two states both friendly to the Arabs. The progressive Arab regimes in Egypt, Syria, and Algeria chose to remain neutral, while the conservative pro-American Arab monarchies in Jordan, Saudi Arabia, Kuwait, and United Arab Emirates openly supported Pakistan. Egypt's stance was met with dismay by the Indians, who had come to expect close co-operation with the Baathist regimes. But, the death of Nasser in 1970 and Sadat's growing friendship with Riyadh, and his mounting differences with Moscow, constrained Egypt to a policy of neutrality. Gandhi's overtures to Muammar Gaddafi were rebuffed. Libya agreed with the Arab monarchies in believing that Gandhi's intervention in East Pakistan was an attack against Islam.

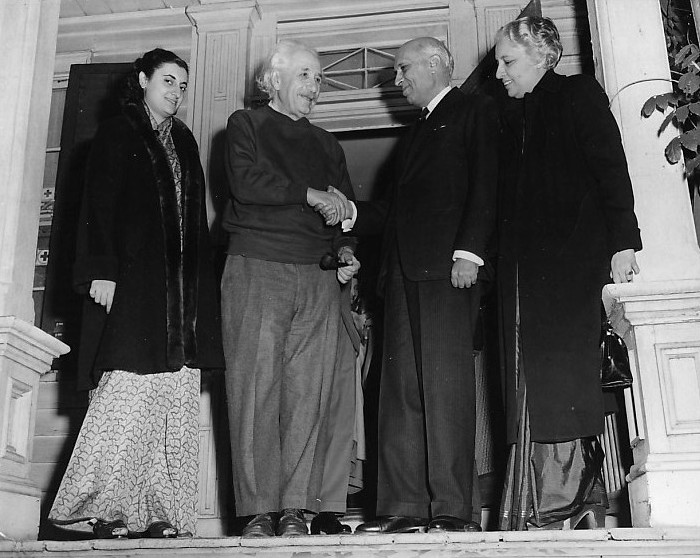
Indira Gandhi and her father Jawaharlal Nehru visit Albert Einstein

The 1971 war became a temporary stumbling block in growing Indo-Iranian ties. Although Iran had earlier characterised the Indo-Pakistani war in 1965 as Indian aggression, the Shah had launched an effort at rapprochement with India in 1969 as part of his effort to secure support for a larger Iranian role in the Persian Gulf. Gandhi's tilt towards Moscow and her dismemberment of Pakistan was perceived by the Shah as part of a larger anti-Iran conspiracy involving India, Iraq, and the Soviet Union. Nevertheless, Iran had resisted Pakistani pressure to activate the Baghdad Pact and draw the Central Treaty Organisation (CENTO) into the conflict. Gradually, Indian and Iranian disillusionment with their respective regional allies led to a renewed partnership between the nations. She was unhappy with the lack of support from India's Arab allies during the war with Pakistan, while the Shah was apprehensive at the growing friendship between Pakistan and Arab states of the Persian Gulf, especially Saudi Arabia, and the growing influence of Islam in Pakistani society. There was an increase in Indian economic and military co-operation with Iran during the 1970s. The 1974 India-Iranian agreement led to Iran supplying nearly 75 percent of India's crude oil demands. Gandhi appreciated the Shah's disregard of Pan-Islamism in diplomacy.

=== Asia-Pacific ===
One of the major developments in Southeast Asia during Gandhi's premiership was the formation of the Association of Southeast Asian Nations (ASEAN) in 1967. Relations between ASEAN and India were mutually antagonistic. India perceived ASEAN to be linked to the Southeast Asia Treaty Organization (SEATO) and, therefore, it was seen as a pro-American organisation. On their part, the ASEAN nations were unhappy with Gandhi's sympathy for the Viet Cong and India's strong links with the USSR. Furthermore, they were also apprehensions in the region about Gandhi's plans, particularly after India played a big role in breaking up Pakistan and facilitating the emergence of Bangladesh as a sovereign country in 1971. India's entry into the nuclear weapons club in 1974 also contributed to tensions in Southeast Asia. Relations only began to improve following Gandhi's endorsement of the ZOPFAN declaration and the disintegration of the SEATO alliance in the aftermath of Pakistani and American defeats in the region. Nevertheless, Gandhi's close relations with reunified Vietnam and her decision to recognise the Vietnam-installed Government of Cambodia in 1980 meant that India and ASEAN were unable to develop a viable partnership.

On 26 September 1981, Gandhi was conferred with the honorary degree of Doctor at the Laucala Graduation at the University of the South Pacific in Fiji.

=== Africa ===
Although independent India was initially viewed as a champion of various African independence movements, its cordial relationship with the Commonwealth of Nations and its liberal views of British policies in East Africa had harmed its image as a staunch supporter of various independence movements in the third world. Indian condemnation of militant struggles in Kenya and Algeria was in sharp contrast to China, who had supported armed struggle to win African independence. After reaching a high diplomatic point in the aftermath of Nehru's role in the Suez Crisis, India's isolation from Africa was almost complete when only four nations—Ethiopia, Kenya, Nigeria, and Libya—supported her during the Sino-Indian War in 1962. After Gandhi became prime minister, diplomatic and economic relations with the states which had sided with India during the Sino-Indian War were expanded. Gandhi began negotiations with the Kenyan government to establish the Africa-India Development Cooperation. The Indian government also started considering the possibility of bringing Indians settled in Africa within the framework of its policy goals to help recover its declining geo-strategic influence. Gandhi declared the people of Indian origin settled in Africa as "Ambassadors of India". Efforts to rope in the Asian community to join Indian diplomacy, however, came to naught, in part because of the unwillingness of Indians to remain in politically insecure surroundings, and because of the exodus of African Indians to Britain with the passing of the Commonwealth Immigrants Act in 1968. In Uganda, the African Indian community suffered persecution and eventually expulsion under the government of Idi Amin.

Foreign and domestic policy successes in the 1970s enabled Gandhi to rebuild India's image in the eyes of African states. Victory over Pakistan and India's possession of nuclear weapons showed the degree of India's progress. Furthermore, the conclusion of the Indo-Soviet treaty in 1971, and threatening gestures by the United States, to send its nuclear-armed Task Force 74 into the Bay of Bengal at the height of the East Pakistan crisis had enabled India to regain its anti-imperialist image. Gandhi firmly tied Indian anti-imperialist interests in Africa to those of the Soviet Union. Unlike Nehru, she openly and enthusiastically supported liberation struggles in Africa. At the same time, Chinese influence in Africa had declined owing to its incessant quarrels with the Soviet Union. These developments permanently halted India's decline in Africa and helped to reestablish its geo-strategic presence.

=== The Commonwealth ===
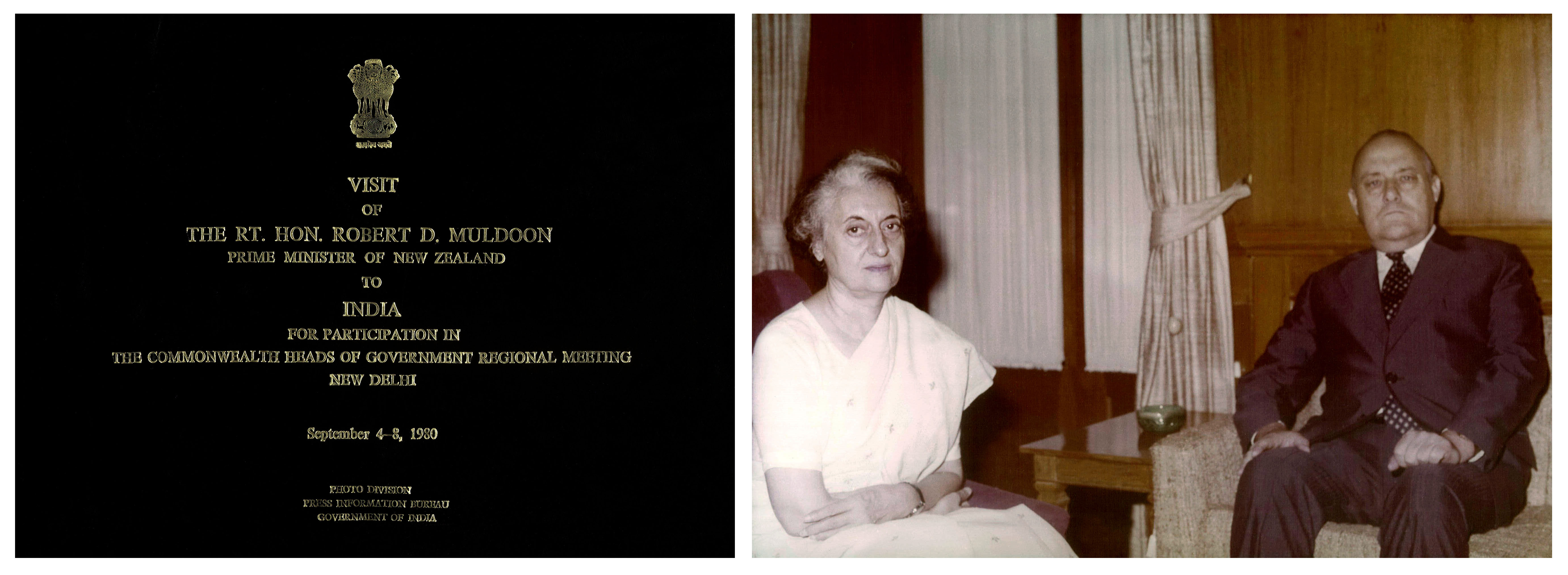
Gandhi meeting New Zealand PM Robert Muldoon in New Delhi, 1980

The Commonwealth is a voluntary association of mainly former British colonies. India maintained cordial relations with most of the members during Gandhi's time in power. In the 1980s, she was regarded alongside Canadian prime minister Pierre Trudeau, Zambian president Kenneth Kaunda, Australian prime minister Malcolm Fraser and Singaporean prime minister Lee Kuan Yew as being one of the pillars of the Commonwealth. India under Gandhi also hosted the 1983 Commonwealth Heads of Government summit in New Delhi. Gandhi used the meetings as a forum to put pressure on member countries to cut economic, sports, and cultural ties with apartheid South Africa.

=== The Non-Aligned Movement ===
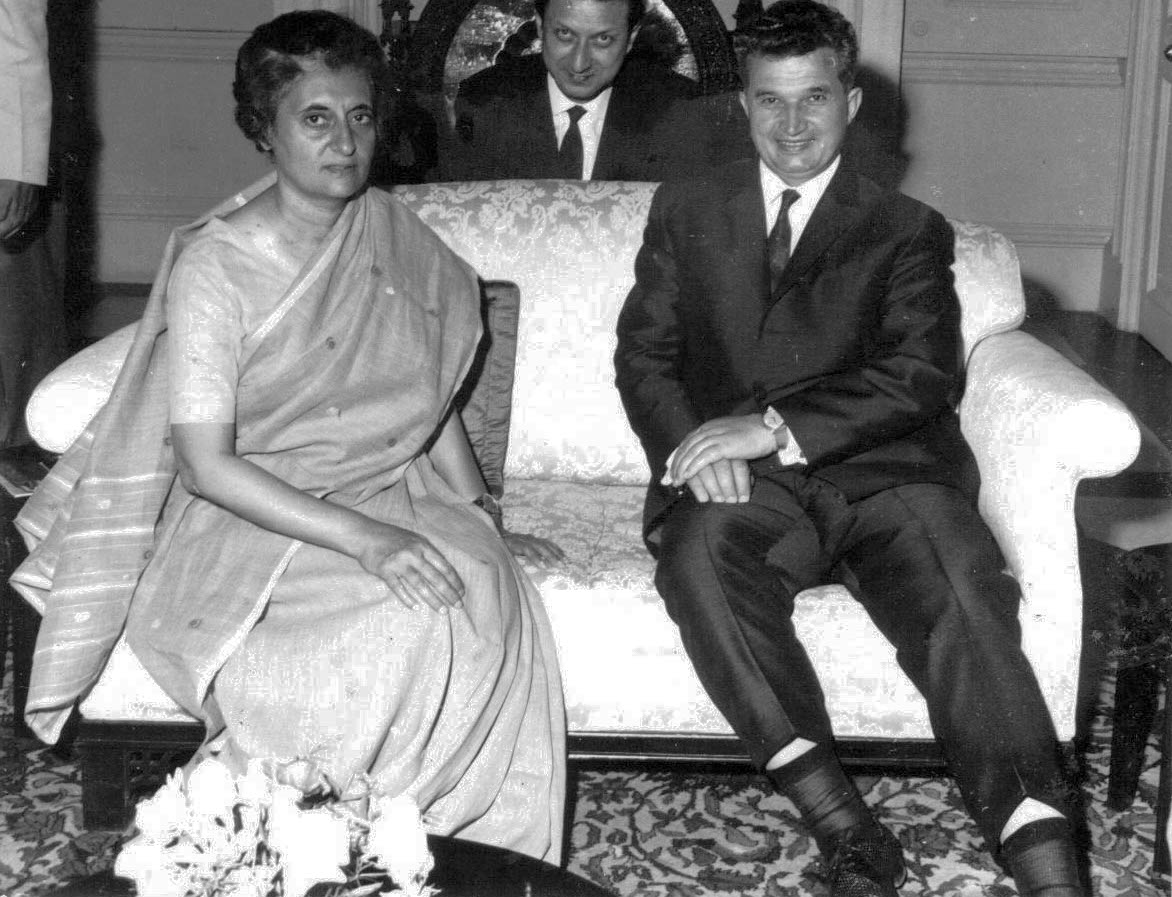
Gandhi with Nicolae Ceaușescu in 1969

In the early 1980s under Gandhi, India attempted to reassert its prominent role in the Non-Aligned Movement by focusing on the relationship between disarmament and economic development. By appealing to the economic grievances of developing countries, Gandhi and her successors exercised a moderating influence on the Non-Aligned Movement, diverting it from some of the Cold War issues that marred the controversial 1979 Havana meeting where Cuban leader Fidel Castro attempted to steer the movement towards the Soviet Union. Although hosting the 1983 summit at Delhi boosted Indian prestige within the movement, its close relations with the Soviet Union and its pro-Soviet positions on Afghanistan and Cambodia limited its influence.

=== Western Europe ===
Gandhi spent a number of years in Europe during her youth and had formed many friendships there. During her premiership she formed friendships with many leaders including West German chancellor, Willy Brandt and Austrian chancellor Bruno Kreisky. She enjoyed a close working relationship with many British leaders including conservative premiers, Edward Heath and Margaret Thatcher.

=== Soviet Union and Eastern Bloc countries ===
The relationship between India and the Soviet Union deepened during Gandhi's rule. The main reason was the perceived bias of the United States and China, rivals of the USSR, towards Pakistan. The support of the Soviets with arms supplies and the casting of a veto at the United Nations helped in winning and consolidating the victory over Pakistan in the 1971 Bangladesh liberation war. Before the war, Gandhi signed a treaty of friendship with the Soviets. They were unhappy with the 1974 nuclear test conducted by India but did not support further action because of the ensuing Cold War with the United States. Gandhi was unhappy with the Soviet invasion of Afghanistan, but once again calculations involving relations with Pakistan and China kept her from criticising the Soviet Union harshly. The Soviets became the main arms supplier during the Gandhi years by offering cheap credit and transactions in rupees rather than in dollars. The easy trade deals also applied to non-military goods. Under Gandhi, by the early 1980s, the Soviets had become India's largest trading partner.

A report following the release of the Mitrokhin Archive also caused some historiographical controversy about Indira Gandhi. In India, a senior leader of the Bharatiya Janata Party, L. K. Advani, requested of the Government a white paper on the role of foreign intelligence agencies and a judicial enquiry on the allegations. The spokesperson of the Indian Congress party referred to the book as "pure sensationalism not even remotely based on facts or records" and pointed out that the book is not based on official records from the Soviet Union. L.K Advani raised his voice because the book refers to ex-prime minister Indira Gandhi's (Codenamed VANO) relations with the KGB.

=== United States ===
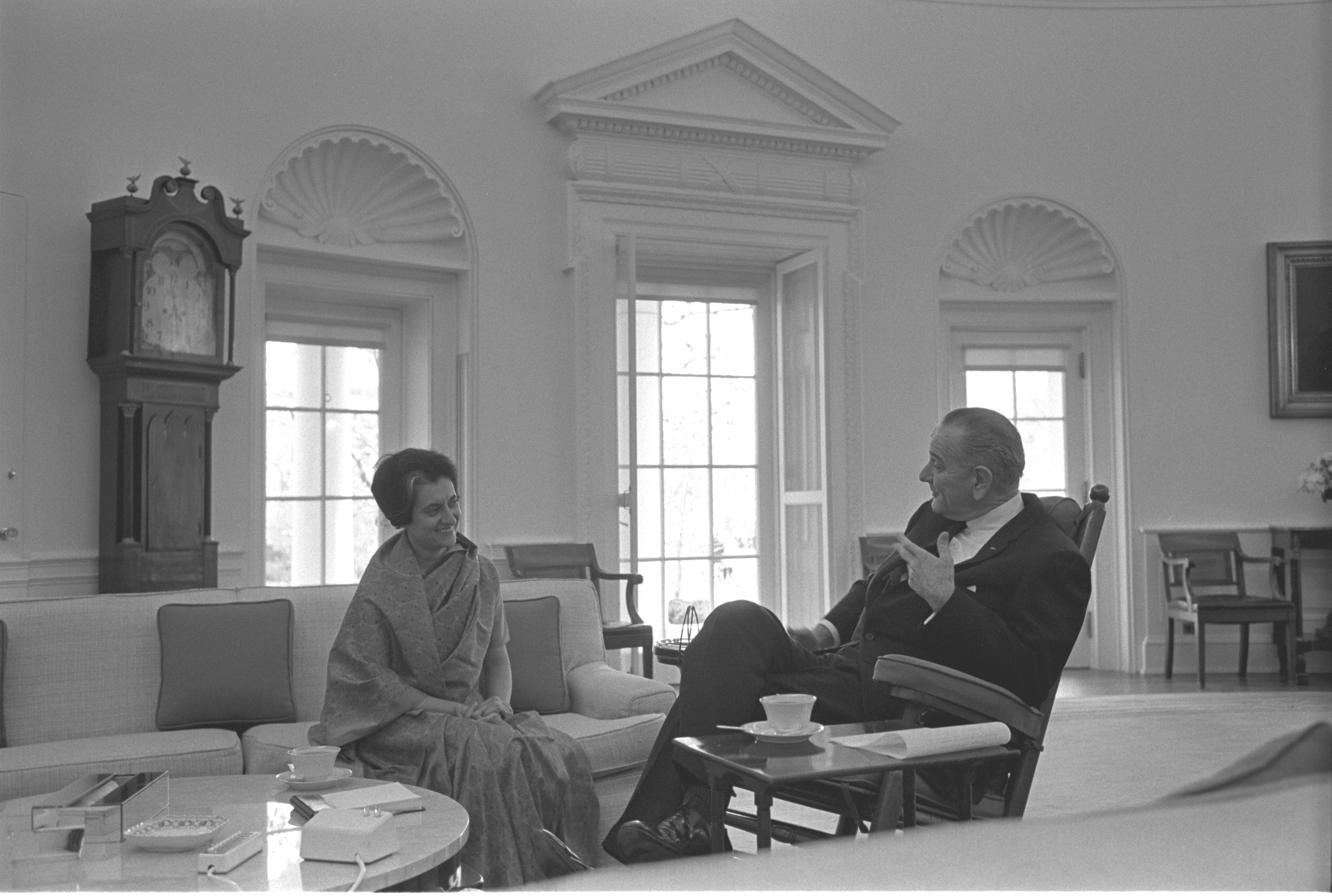
Gandhi meeting President Lyndon B. Johnson in the Oval Office on 28 March 1966

When Gandhi came to power in 1966, Lyndon Johnson was the US president. At the time, India was reliant on the US for food aid. Gandhi resented the US policy of food aid being used as a tool to force India to adopt policies favoured by the US. She also resolutely refused to sign the Treaty on the Non-Proliferation of Nuclear Weapons (NPT). Relations with the US were strained badly under President Richard Nixon and his favouring of Pakistan during the Bangladesh liberation war. Nixon despised Gandhi politically and personally. In 1981, Gandhi met President Ronald Reagan for the first time at the North–South Summit held to discuss global poverty. She had been described to him as an 'Ogre', but he found her charming and easy to work with and they formed a close working relationship during her premiership in the 1980s.

== Economic policy ==
Gandhi presided over three Five-Year Plans as prime minister, two of which succeeded in meeting their targeted growth.

There is considerable debate whether Gandhi was a socialist on principle or out of political expediency. Sunanda K. Datta-Ray described her as "a master of rhetoric ... often more posture than policy", while The Times journalist, Peter Hazelhurst, famously quipped that Gandhi's socialism was "slightly left of self-interest." Critics have focused on the contradictions in the evolution of her stance towards communism. Gandhi was known for her anti-communist stance in the 1950s, with Meghnad Desai even describing her as "the scourge of [India's] Communist Party." Yet, she later forged close relations with Indian communists even while using the army to break the Naxalites. In this context, Gandhi was accused of formulating populist policies to suit her political needs. She was seemingly against the rich and big business while preserving the status quo to manipulate the support of the left in times of political insecurity, such as the late 1960s. Although in time Gandhi came to be viewed as the scourge of the right-wing and reactionary political elements of India, leftist opposition to her policies emerged. As early as 1969, critics had begun accusing her of insincerity and Machiavellianism. The Indian Libertarian wrote, "it would be difficult to find a more machiavellian leftist than Mrs Indira Gandhi... for here is Machiavelli at its best in the person of a suave, charming and astute politician." J. Barkley Rosser Jr. wrote that "some have even seen the declaration of emergency rule in 1975 as a move to suppress [leftist] dissent against Gandhi's policy shift to the right." In the 1980s, Gandhi was accused of "betraying socialism" after the beginning of Operation Forward, an attempt at economic reform. Nevertheless, others were more convinced of Gandhi's sincerity and devotion to socialism. Pankaj Vohra noted that "even the late prime minister's critics would concede that the maximum number of legislations of social significance was brought about during her tenure... [and that] she lives in the hearts of millions of Indians who shared her concern for the poor and weaker sections and who supported her politics."

In summarising the biographical works on Gandhi, Blema S. Steinberg concludes she was decidedly non-ideological. Only 7.4% (24) of the total 330 biographical extractions posit ideology as a reason for her policy choices. Steinberg notes Gandhi's association with socialism was superficial. She had only a general and traditional commitment to the ideology by way of her political and family ties. Gandhi personally had a fuzzy concept of socialism. In one of the early interviews she gave as prime minister, Gandhi ruminated, "I suppose you could call me a socialist, but you have understand what we mean by that term ... we used the word [socialism] because it came closest to what we wanted to do here–which is to eradicate poverty. You can call it socialism; but if by using that word we arouse controversy, I don't see why we should use it. I don't believe in words at all." Regardless of the debate over her ideology or lack thereof, Gandhi remains a left-wing icon. She has been described by Hindustan Times columnist, Pankaj Vohra, as "arguably the greatest mass leader of the last century." Her campaign slogan, Garibi Hatao ('Remove Poverty'), has become an often used motto of the Indian National Congress Party. To the rural and urban poor, Dalits, minorities and women in India, Gandhi was "Indira Amma or Mother Indira."

=== Green Revolution and the Fourth Five-Year Plan ===
Gandhi inherited a weak and troubled economy. Fiscal problems associated with the war with Pakistan in 1965, along with a drought-induced food crisis that spawned famines, had plunged India into the sharpest recession since independence. The government responded by taking steps to liberalise the economy and agreeing to the devaluation of the currency in return for the restoration of foreign aid. The economy managed to recover in 1966 and ended up growing at 4.1% over 1966–1969. Much of that growth however, was offset by the fact that the external aid promised by the United States government and the International Bank for Reconstruction and Development (IBRD), meant to ease the short-run costs of adjustment to a liberalised economy, never materialised. American policy makers had complained of continued restrictions imposed on the economy. At the same time, Indo-US relations were strained because of Gandhi's criticism of the American bombing campaign in Vietnam. In light of the circumstances, liberalisation became politically suspect and was soon abandoned. Grain diplomacy and currency devaluation became matters of intense national pride in India. After the bitter experience with Johnson, Gandhi decided not to request food aid in the future. Moreover, her government resolved never again to become "so vulnerably dependent" on aid, and painstakingly began building up substantial foreign exchange reserves. When food stocks slumped after poor harvests in 1972, the government made it a point to use foreign exchange to buy US wheat commercially rather than seek resumption of food aid.

The period of 1967–75 was characterised by socialist ascendency in India, which culminated in 1976 with the official declaration of state socialism. Gandhi not only abandoned the short-lived liberalisation programme but also aggressively expanded the public sector with new licensing requirements and other restrictions for industry. She began a new course by launching the Fourth Five-Year Plan in 1969. The government targeted growth at 5.7% while stating as its goals, "growth with stability and progressive achievement of self-reliance." The rationale behind the overall plan was Gandhi's Ten-Point Programme of 1967. This had been her first economic policy formulation, six months after coming to office. The programme emphasised greater state control of the economy with the understanding that government control assured greater welfare than private control. Related to this point were a set of policies that were meant to regulate the private sector. By the end of the 1960s, the reversal of the liberalisation process was complete, and India's policies were characterised as "protectionist as ever."

To deal with India's food problems, Gandhi expanded the emphasis on production of inputs to agriculture that had already been initiated by her father, Jawaharlal Nehru. The Green Revolution in India subsequently culminated under her government in the 1970s. It transformed the country from a nation heavily reliant on imported grains, and prone to famine, to one largely able to feed itself, and becoming successful in achieving its goal of food security. Gandhi had a personal motive in pursuing agricultural self-sufficiency, having found India's dependency on the U.S. for shipments of grains humiliating.

The economic period of 1967–1975 became significant for its major wave of nationalisation amidst increased regulation of the private sector. Some other objectives of the economic plan for that period were providing for the minimum needs of the community through a rural works program and the removal of the privy purses of the nobility. Those and many other goals of the 1967 programme were accomplished by 1974–1975. Nevertheless, the success of the overall economic plan was tempered by the fact that annual growth at 3.3–3.4% over 1969–1974 fell short of the targeted figure.

=== The Fifth Five-Year Plan ===
The Fifth Five-Year Plan (1974–1979) was enacted with the backdrop of the state of emergency and the Twenty Point Program of 1975. It was the economic rationale of the emergency, a political act which has often been justified on economic grounds. In contrast to the reception of Gandhi's earlier economic plan, this one was criticised for being a "hastily thrown together wish list." She promised to reduce poverty by targeting the consumption levels of the poor and enact wide-ranging social and economic reforms. In addition, the government targeted an annual growth rate of 4.4% over the period of the plan.

The measures of the emergency regime was able to halt the economic trouble of the early to mid-1970s, which had been marred by harvest failures, fiscal contraction, and the breakdown of the Bretton Woods system of fixed exchanged rates. The resulting turbulence in the foreign exchange markets was accentuated further by the oil shock of 1973. The government was able to exceed the targeted growth figure with an annual growth rate of 5.0–5.2% over the five-year period of the plan (1974–79). The economy grew at the rate of 9% in 1975–76 alone, and the Fifth Plan, became the first plan during which the per capita income of the economy grew by over 5%.

=== Operation Forward and the Sixth Five-Year Plan ===
Gandhi inherited a weak economy when she became prime minister again in 1980. The preceding year—1979–80—under the Janata Party government saw the strongest recession (−5.2%) in the history of modern India with inflation rampant at 18.2%. Gandhi proceeded to abrogate the Janata Party government's Five-Year Plan in 1980 and launched the Sixth Five-Year Plan (1980–85). Her government targeted an average growth rate of 5.2% over the period of the plan. Measures to check inflation were also taken; by the early 1980s it was under control at an annual rate of about 5%.

Although Gandhi continued professing socialist beliefs, the Sixth Five-Year Plan was markedly different from the years of Garibi Hatao. Populist programmes and policies were replaced by pragmatism. There was an emphasis on tightening public expenditures, greater efficiency of the state-owned enterprises (SOE), which Gandhi qualified as a "sad thing", and on stimulating the private sector through deregulation and liberation of the capital market. The government subsequently launched Operation Forward in 1982, the first cautious attempt at reform. The Sixth Plan went on to become the most successful of the Five-Year Plans yet; showing an average growth rate of 5.7% over 1980–85.

=== Inflation and unemployment ===
The price of oil during the 1970s energy crisis, the graph shows sharp increases in 1973 and again in 1979

During Lal Bahadur Shastri's last full year in office (1965), inflation averaged 7.7%, compared to 5.2% at the end of Gandhi's first term in office (1977). On average, inflation in India had remained below 7% through the 1950s and 1960s. It then accelerated sharply in the 1970s, from 5.5% in 1970–71 to over 20% by 1973–74, due to the international oil crisis. Gandhi declared inflation the gravest of problems in 1974 (at 25.2%) and devised a severe anti-inflation program. The government was successful in bringing down inflation during the emergency; achieving negative figures of −1.1% by the end of 1975–76.

Gandhi inherited a tattered economy in her second term; harvest failures and a second oil shock in the late 1970s had caused inflation to rise again. During Charan Singh's short time in office in the second half of 1979, inflation averaged 18.2%, compared to 6.5% during Gandhi's last year in office (1984). General economic recovery under Gandhi led to an average inflation rate of 6.5% from 1981–82 to 1985–86—the lowest since the beginning of India's inflation problems in the 1960s.

The unemployment rate remained constant at 9% over a nine-year period (1971–80) before declining to 8.3% in 1983.

== Domestic policy ==
=== Nationalisation ===
Despite the provisions, control and regulations of the Reserve Bank of India, most banks in India were owned and operated by private persons. Bankowners were often accused of channeling the deposits into their own companies, and ignoring priority sector lending. There was a great resentment against class banking in India, which left the poor (the majority of the population) unbanked. After becoming prime minister, Gandhi expressed her intention of nationalising the banks to alleviate poverty in a paper titled, "Stray thoughts on Bank Nationalisation". The paper received overwhelming public support. In 1969, Gandhi moved to nationalise fourteen major commercial banks. After this, public sector bank branch deposits increased by approximately 800 percent; advances took a huge jump by 11,000 percent. Nationalisation also resulted in significant growth in the geographic coverage of banks. Gandhi's nationalisation of the banks was supported by the Praja Socialist Party leader, Jayaprakash Narayan, who later became a political opponent and critic.

Re-elected in 1971 on a nationalisation platform, Gandhi nationalised the coal, steel, copper, refining, cotton textiles, and insurance industries. Nationalisation was done to protect employment and the interests of organised labour. The remaining private sector industries were placed under strict regulatory control. During the Indo-Pakistani war of 1971, foreign-owned private oil companies refused to resupply the Indian Navy and Indian Air Force. In response, Gandhi nationalised some oil companies in 1973. However, the major nationalisations occurred in 1974 and 1976, forming the oil majors. After nationalisation, the oil majors including the Indian Oil Corporation (IOC), the Hindustan Petroleum Corporation (HPCL), and the Bharat Petroleum Corporation (BPCL) had to keep a minimum stock level of oil to be supplied to the military when needed.

=== Administration ===
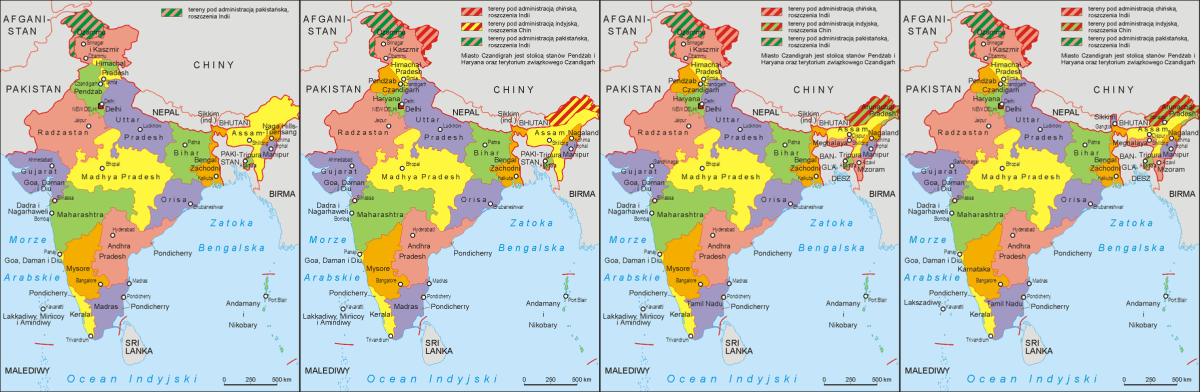
Administrative divisions of India 1961–1975, Gandhi established six states, Haryana (1966), Himachal Pradesh (1971), Meghalaya, Manipur and Tripura (all 1972), and finally Sikkim (1975), bringing the total of states to 22, she also established Arunachal Pradesh and Mizoram (1972) as Union Territories

In 1966, Gandhi accepted the demands of the Akalis to reorganise Punjab on linguistic lines. The Hindi-speaking southern half of Punjab became a separate state, Haryana, while the Pahari speaking hilly areas in the northeast were joined to Himachal Pradesh. By this action she had hoped to ward off the growing political conflict between Hindu and Sikh groups in the region. However, a contentious issue that was considered unresolved by the Akalis was the status of Chandigarh, a prosperous city on the Punjab-Haryana border, which Gandhi declared a union territory to be shared as a capital by both the states.

Victory over Pakistan in 1971 consolidated Indian power in Kashmir. Gandhi indicated that she would make no major concessions on Kashmir. The most prominent of the Kashmiri separatists, Sheikh Abdullah, had to recognise India's control over Kashmir in light of the new order in South Asia. The situation was normalised in the years following the war after Abdullah agreed to an accord with Gandhi, by giving up the demand for a plebiscite in return for a special autonomous status for Kashmir. In 1975, Gandhi declared the state of Jammu and Kashmir as a constituent unit of India. The Kashmir conflict remained largely peaceful if frozen under Gandhi's premiership.

In 1972, Gandhi granted statehood to Meghalaya, Manipur, and Tripura while the North-East Frontier Agency was declared a union territory and renamed Arunachal Pradesh. The transition to statehood for the territories was successfully overseen by her administration and it was followed by the annexation of Sikkim in 1975.

=== Social reform ===
The principle of equal pay for equal work for both men and women was enshrined in the Indian Constitution under the Gandhi administration.

Gandhi also participated in initiatives promoting women’s issues. On 16 February 1975, she inaugurated an event marking National Women’s Day and International Women's Year (IWY), jointly sponsored by 50 women’s organisations at the NDMC Indoor Stadium in New Delhi.

Gandhi questioned the continued existence of a privy purse for former rulers of princely states. She argued the case for abolition based on equal rights for all citizens and the need to reduce the government's revenue deficit. The nobility responded by rallying around the Jana Sangh and other right-wing parties that stood in opposition to Gandhi's attempts to abolish royal privileges. The motion to abolish privy purses, and the official recognition of the titles, was originally brought before the Parliament in 1970. It was passed in the Lok Sabha but fell short of the two-thirds majority in the Rajya Sabha by a single vote. Gandhi responded by having a Presidential proclamation issued; de-recognising the princes; with this withdrawal of recognition, their claims to privy purses were also legally lost. However, the proclamation was struck down by the Supreme Court of India. In 1971, she again motioned to abolish the privy purse and it was passed successfully as the 26th Amendment to the Constitution of India.

Gandhi claimed that only "clear vision, iron will and the strictest discipline" can remove poverty. She justified the imposition of the state of emergency in 1975 in the name of the socialist mission of the Congress. Armed with the power to rule by decree and without constitutional constraints, she embarked on a massive redistribution program. The provisions included rapid enforcement of land ceilings, housing for landless labourers, the abolition of bonded labour and a moratorium on the debts of the poor. North India was at the centre of the reforms. Millions of hectares of land were acquired and redistributed. The government was also successful in procuring houses for landless labourers; According to Francine Frankel, three-fourths of the targeted four million houses was achieved in 1975 alone. Nevertheless, others have disputed the success of the program and criticised Gandhi for not doing enough to reform land ownership. The political economist, Jyotindra Das Gupta, cryptically questioned "whether or not the real supporters of land-holders were in jail or in power?" Critics also accused Gandhi of choosing to "talk left and act right", referring to her concurrent pro-business decisions and endeavours. J. Barkley Rosser Jr. wrote that "some have even seen the declaration of emergency rule in 1975 as a move to suppress dissent against Gandhi's policy shift to the right." Regardless of the controversy over the nature of the reforms, the long-term effects of the social changes gave rise to the prominence of middle-ranking farmers from intermediate and lower castes in North India. The rise of the newly empowered social classes challenged the political establishment of the Hindi Belt in the years to come.

=== Language policy ===
Under the 1950 Constitution of India, Hindi was to be the official national language by 1965. That was unacceptable to many non-Hindi-speaking states which wanted the continued use of English in government. In 1967, Gandhi introduced a constitutional amendment that guaranteed the de facto use of both Hindi and English as official languages. It established the official government policy of bilingualism in India and satisfied the non-Hindi-speaking Indian states. She thus put herself forward as a leader with a pan-Indian vision. Nevertheless, critics alleged that her stance was actually meant to weaken the position of rival Congress leaders from the northern states such as Uttar Pradesh, where there had been strong, sometimes violent, pro-Hindi agitations. Gandhi came out of the language conflicts with the strong support of the south Indian populace.

=== National security ===
During Gandhi's first Premiership (1966-1977), the Indian army fought and defeated militant Communist uprisings in West Bengal. The communist insurgency was completely suppressed during the state of emergency from 1975 to 1977. During this period, North-East India was also experiencing major insurgencies. In 1966, the Mizo uprising took place against the Government of Assam, India, and occupied much of the territory of future Mizoram in the Lushai Hills. Gandhi ordered the Indian Army to retaliate with both land and aviation units. The rebellion was suppressed with the Indian Air Force carrying out airstrikes in Aizawl. The defeat of Pakistan in 1971 and the secession of East Pakistan as pro-India Bangladesh led to the collapse of Mizo militancy. In 1972, Gandhi upgraded Mizoram to the status of a union territory after negotiations with the Mizo rebels. A small-scale insurgency by some militants continued into the late 1970s, but it was successfully dealt with by the government. The Mizo conflict was definitively ended with the Mizoram Peace Accord signed in 1986 during the administration of Gandhi's son and successor, Rajiv Gandhi.

Nagaland was another part of India where an active insurgency fought government forces. The Indian army was tasked with executing military operations in the 1970s. A major offensive against insurgents took place during the state of emergency declared in 1975. The insurgents soon agreed to surrender and signed the Shillong Accord in November 1975. While the agreement ended large-scale conflicts and thus deemed a victory for the Indian government, there have since been spurts of violence by rebel holdouts such as the National Socialist Council of Nagaland.

During Gandhi's second premiership (1980-1984), the government faced the Assam Movement which had begun in 1979. The movement was comprised of civic bodies in Assam demanding the detection, disenfranchisement and deportation of unauthorised immigrants from former East Pakistan or Bangladesh. She met the leaders of the protests in Delhi on 2 February 1980. However, she did not accept their demand to use the National Register of Citizens of 1951 and the Census report of 1952 as the basis for identifying illegal aliens. Gandhi suggested 24 March 1971 as the cut-off date instead since she wanted to fulfill the Liaquat–Nehru Pact of 1950 and the Indo-Bangla Treaty of Friendship, Cooperation and Peace of 1972. The cut-off date became the major stumbling block during the negotiations. The conflict continued until the Assam Accord was signed in 1985 between the Assam agitation leaders and the Government of India headed by Gandhi's son and successor, Rajiv Gandhi.

The state of Punjab was established in 1966 after Gandhi agreed to the demands of the Punjabi Suba movement, which partitioned the historical Punjab region in India into three states: Punjab, Haryana, and Himachal Pradesh. While Punjab was a Punjabi, and incidentally, Sikh majority state, Haryana was a Hindi-speaking state, and Himachal was a Pahari-speaking state. The Punjab benefitted from the Green Revolution, but this development led also to widening disparities in wealth. Chandigarh, which had been laid out as independent India's first planned city, became the joint-capital of Punjab and Haryana and a point of contention as both states wanted the city as its sole capital. In 1969, the Shiromani Akali Dal (SAD) formed the first non-Congress government in Punjab. After losing power in the 1972 elections, the SAD passed the Anandpur Sahib Resolution. In 1982, the SAD and Jarnail Singh Bhindranwale launched the Dharam Yudh Morcha in order to force the government to implement the resolution. In July 1983, SAD President Harchand Singh Longowal invited Bhindranwale to take up residence at the Harmandir Sahib complex (aka the Golden Temple) in Amritsar, Punjab – the most sacred site in Sikhism. The Indian government would allege that Bhindranwale made the complex an armoury and headquarters for an armed uprising. Operation Blue Star was an Indian military operation ordered by Gandhi, between 1 and 8 June 1984, to remove Bhindranwale and his armed followers from the buildings of the Golden Temple.

=== India's nuclear programme ===
Gandhi contributed to and carried out further, the vision of Jawaharlal Nehru, the former premier of India, to develop its nuclear program. Gandhi authorised the development of nuclear weapons in 1967, in response to Test No. 6 by the People's Republic of China. Gandhi saw the test as Chinese nuclear intimidation and promoted Nehru's views to establish India's stability and security interests independent from those of the nuclear superpowers.

The programme became fully mature in 1974, when Raja Ramanna reported to Gandhi that India had the ability to test its first nuclear weapon. Gandhi gave verbal authorisation for the test, and preparations were made in the Indian Army's Pokhran Test Range. In 1974, India successfully conducted an underground nuclear test, unofficially code named "Smiling Buddha", near the desert village of Pokhran in Rajasthan. As the world was quiet about this test, a vehement protest came from Pakistan as its prime minister, Zulfikar Ali Bhutto, described the test as "Indian hegemony" to intimidate Pakistan. In response to this, Bhutto launched a massive campaign to make Pakistan a nuclear power. Bhutto asked the nation to unite and slogans such as "hum ghaas aur pattay kha lay gay magar nuclear power ban k rhe gay" ("We will eat grass or leaves or even go hungry, but we will get nuclear power") were employed. Gandhi directed a letter to Bhutto, and later to the world, claiming the test was for peaceful purposes and part of India's commitment to develop its programme for industrial and scientific use.

In spite of intense international criticism and steady decline in foreign investment and trade, the nuclear test was popular domestically. The test caused an immediate revival of Gandhi's popularity, which had flagged considerably from its heights after the India–Pakistan war of 1971. The overall popularity and image of the Congress Party was enhanced and the Congress Party was well received in the Indian Parliament.

== Electoral history ==
=== Parliament: Lok Sabha ===
Year	Constituency	Party	Votes	%	Opponent	Opponent Party	Opponent Votes	%	Result	Margin	%
1967	Rae Bareli	INC	143,602	55.19	B. C. Seth	IND	51,899	19.95	Won	91,703	35.24
1971	Rae Bareli	INC(R)	183,309	66.35	Raj Narain	SSP	71,499	25.88	Won	111,810	40.47
1977	Rae Bareli	INC(R)	122,517	36.89	Raj Narain	JP	177,719	53.51	Lost	-55,202	-16.62
1978	Chikmagalur (by-election)	INC(I)	249,376	55.72	Veerendra Patil	JP	172,043	38.44	Won	77,333	17.28
1980	Rae Bareli	INC(I)	223,903	58.27	Vijayaraje Scindia	JP	50,249	12.55	Won	173,654	45.72
1980	Medak	INC(I)	301,577	67.93	S. Jaipal Reddy	JP	82,453	18.57	Won	219,124	49.36

=== Rajya Sabha ===
Position	Party	Constituency	From	To	Tenure
Member of Parliament, Rajya Sabha (1st Term)	INC	Uttar Pradesh	26 August 1964	23 February 1967	2 years, 181 days

== Personal life ==
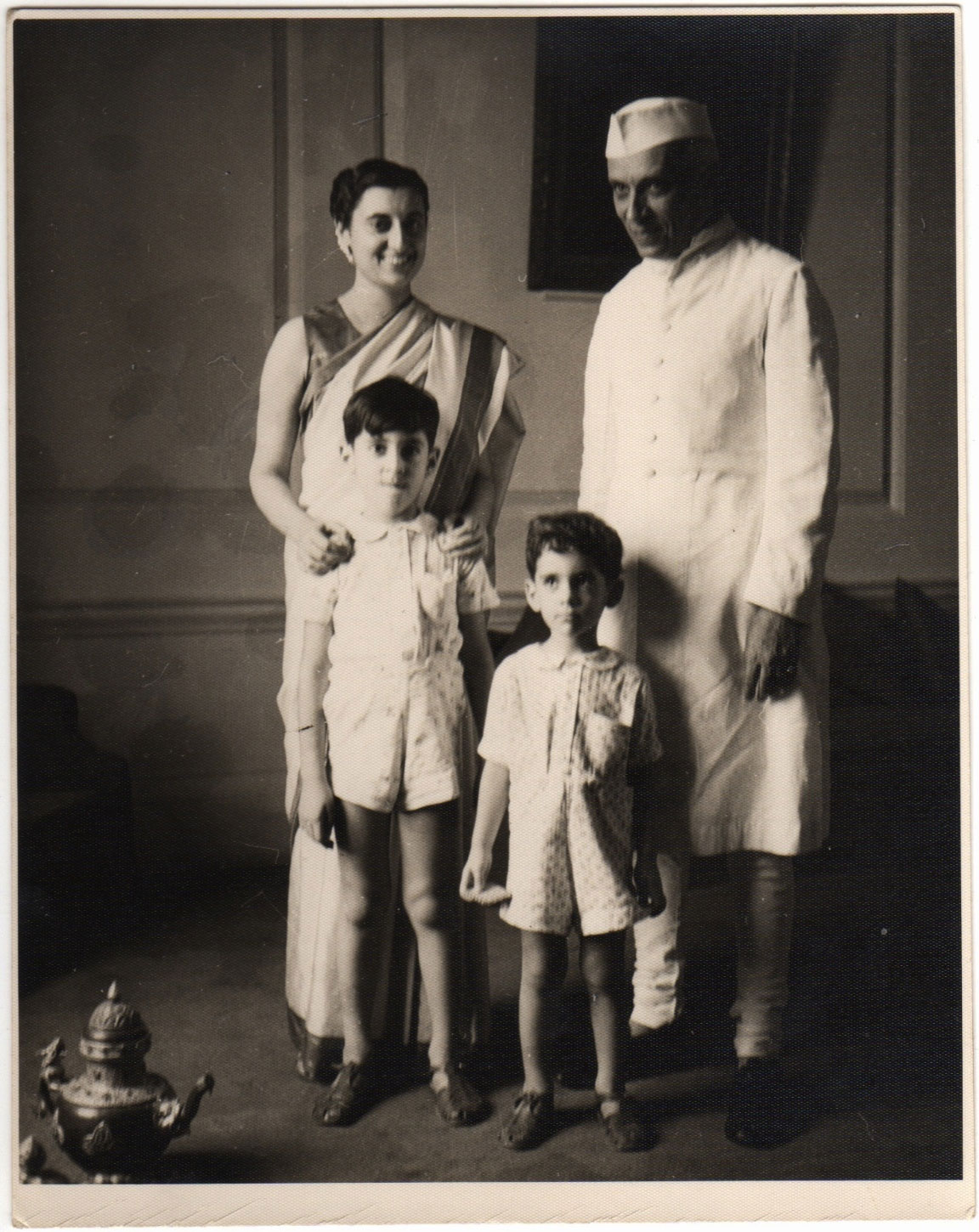
Indira and her father Jawaharlal Nehru and her two sons, brothers Rajiv and Sanjay, in June 1949

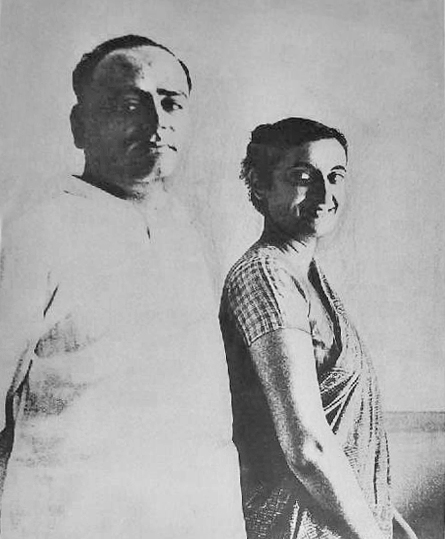
Portrait of Indira Gandhi and her husband Feroze

Gandhi was deeply affected by her mother’s prolonged illness and death in February 1936, when she was 18. She credited her mother with influencing her decision to marry, explaining that she might not have married had her mother lived longer. Indira's education took her to several institutions in India and Europe. She attended schools in India and Switzerland before studying at Santiniketan, the educational institution founded by Rabindranath Tagore in Bengal. Her time there exposed her to Indian art, literature, music and cultural traditions. She also studied dance during this period, although she later admitted that she had not become particularly accomplished at singing.

One of the people associated with her Santiniketan years was Lionel Edirisinghe, a Sri Lankan musician and musicologist. Edirisinghe studied at Visva-Bharati in Santiniketan, where he was a classmate of Indira. They had a romantic relationship, which was cut short due to her mother’s illness. Whenever Gandhi visited Sri Lanka, she would meet Edirisinghe and his family. During her time in Europe, Gandhi also became acquainted with Frank Oberdorf, a German teacher who had taught her French. Oberdorf developed strong feelings for her and expressed a desire to marry her. Gandhi did not reciprocate his feelings to the same degree and eventually made clear that she did not intend to marry him. She subsequently returned her attention to Feroze Gandhi, with whom she had developed a much closer romantic relationship.

Indira's relationship with Feroze Gandhi began when they were young. Feroze had known the Nehru family for years and had become close to Indira and her mother, Kamala. He proposed to Indira when she was about sixteen and continued to express his wish to marry her over the following years. She initially hesitated, partly because she was deeply involved in the independence movement and had not yet decided whether marriage was compatible with the life she wanted. She later explained that, although she had once thought marriage would distract her from her responsibilities, she eventually began to want a family and children.

In 1937, while travelling through Paris, Gandhi finally accepted Feroze's proposal. He had asked her to marry him near the Sacré-Cœur in Montmartre. She later remembered the occasion as a happy moment in their youth, describing how they had been in love and had imagined a future together. The couple's relationship continued despite opposition and reservations within parts of the Nehru family. Their different backgrounds also attracted criticism, as Feroze was Parsi while Gandhi came from a Kashmiri Hindu family. Mahatma Gandhi publicly defended their right to marry and appealed for the couple to be treated with respect. She eventually married Feroze on 26 March 1942 in Allahbad. She was 24 years old. Indira wore a pink cotton sari made from yarn spun by her father. She later recalled that she had wanted children and had originally imagined having a much larger family, although Feroze preferred to have two.

The couple had two sons, Rajiv Gandhi, born on 20 August 1944, and Sanjay Gandhi, born on 14 December 1946. Indira later described the birth of Rajiv as one of the most satisfying experiences of her life. She had been advised by doctors to avoid pregnancy because of her health, but was determined to become a mother. She recalled that she had felt a strong sense of achievement when her first son was born and that motherhood was something she had wanted for a long time. Although Gandhi and Feroze had married for love, their relationship became increasingly strained after Indian independence in 1947. When Jawaharlal Nehru became Prime Minister, she moved to New Delhi and assumed extensive responsibilities within his household. She also acted as his official hostess, accompanied him on tours and received political visitors. Feroze pursued his own career, becoming a Member of Parliament and spending considerable time away from the Prime Minister's residence. The demands of their separate lives meant that the couple frequently lived apart.

Feroze initially accepted Gandhi’s responsibilities to her father, but gradually became dissatisfied with the amount of time she devoted to Nehru's household. Their circumstances also created awkward social situations. At official dinners, protocol often placed Gandhi beside her father, while Feroze was seated further down the table. Feroze sometimes felt embarrassed and excluded by the arrangement. In the mid-1950s he moved into a separate residence in New Delhi, although the couple remained married and continued to see one another. Their marriage was also affected by Feroze's social life and relationships with other women. A later relationship on Feroze's part caused Gandhi considerable distress, and the couple reportedly came close to considering a formal separation following a serious argument. Jawaharlal Nehru subsequently spoke with Feroze, who eventually abandoned the idea of pursuing a separation.

Gandhi acknowledged that she and Feroze had argued frequently, describing both of them as strong-willed. She nevertheless maintained that they had loved one another and that their periods living apart had largely resulted from their different responsibilities. She recalled that she had travelled between Delhi and Lucknow to spend time with him and did not regard their marriage as having ended when they occupied separate homes. She also said that her affection for Feroze had grown over the years. There were signs of a reconciliation during the final years of their marriage. In 1958, Feroze suffered a heart attack, and Gandhi returned from a trip to Bhutan to look after him during his recovery. When she underwent surgery for a kidney stone in 1959, Feroze was similarly attentive and remained by her side. Their differences had begun to recede, and in 1960 the family took a holiday together in Kashmir. However, Feroze suffered another heart attack and died on 8 September 1960, aged 48. Indira was in Kerala when she received the news and returned to be with him. Their marriage had lasted eighteen years.

Gandhi regarded motherhood as one of the most fulfilling parts of her life. She described herself as a devoted mother and said that she had always wanted children. She recalled arranging her daily routine around Rajiv and Sanjay when they were young, making an effort to be at home when they returned from school. She believed that women could combine family responsibilities with work and other interests if they organised their time carefully. Although her public responsibilities eventually became extensive, she continued to regard her years raising her sons as an important and satisfying part of her life.

She took a close interest in the boys' education and upbringing. Indira preferred that they attend Rishi Valley School rather than the more prestigious Doon School, which Feroze favoured. She wanted them to experience a degree of independence and to avoid growing up entirely within the privileged surroundings of their grandfather's household. The boys attended boarding school, and Gandhi maintained contact with them during their time away. She also arranged for them to spend their summer holidays in the mountains, sometimes camping in remote areas rather than staying in comfortable accommodation. She later remembered these holidays as particularly enjoyable, with the family living in tents among pine trees and bathing in mountain streams.

Her relationships with her sons developed differently in adulthood. Sanjay became increasingly involved in politics and was widely regarded as her closest political confidant. He frequently advised her and became a prominent figure in her political circle. Rajiv, by contrast, initially preferred a private life and worked as a pilot with Indian Airlines. He did not seek a political career and remained outside much of his mother's political activity until Sanjay's death. The death of Sanjay in an aircraft accident on 23 June 1980 was a devastating personal loss. Indira had become particularly close to him during his adult years, and his death deprived her of the son on whom she had increasingly relied for advice and companionship. She subsequently turned to Rajiv, who was reluctant to abandon his career as a pilot but eventually entered politics in 1981. His decision brought him into a much more prominent public role and changed the relationship between mother and son, as he increasingly became involved in her political responsibilities.

=== Widowhood ===
Feroze's death in 1960 left Gandhi a widow at the age of 42. She was deeply affected by his death, despite the difficulties that had marked their marriage. In a letter recalled in later biographical accounts, she described herself as desolate and miserable and remembered the closeness they had developed during the final years of their relationship. She particularly treasured memories of their holiday in Kashmir, when they had spent time together and made plans for the future. She also expressed concern that their sons had lost their father while they were still young. The loss remained an important part of her personal history.

She never remarried. When asked by Oriana Fallaci whether she had considered marrying again, Gandhi replied that she had not met anyone with whom she wished to share her life and did not believe she would have married again even if she had. She explained that her life was already full. Although she subsequently devoted much of her time to public responsibilities, she continued to regard her years as a wife and mother as some of the most meaningful in her life. She also continued to speak of Feroze with affection and did not portray their marriage simply as a failed relationship.

Indira enjoyed being a grandmother and spoke warmly about the experience in her interview with Oriana Fallaci in 1976. Through Rajiv and Sonia Gandhi, she became the grandmother of Rahul and Priyanka Gandhi. Through Sanjay and Maneka Gandhi, she had another grandson, Varun Gandhi. She enjoyed spending time with them when her public responsibilities allowed.

=== Interests ===
Gandhi liked reading and said that she read constantly, both while working and during the evening. She was particularly interested in books about freedom struggles and people who had fought for independence. She also maintained friendships with people she had known during her school and college years. Her interest in literature extended beyond political history, and she enjoyed novels, theatre and films. Gandhi particularly enjoyed difficult paths and later remarked that, when walking, she naturally chose the steeper route rather than an easy, straight road. She enjoyed mountain scenery, forests and remote places, and regarded time spent outdoors as an important contrast to the demands of her working life. During her sons' childhood, she arranged for the family to spend summer holidays camping in the mountains. She preferred remote locations away from crowds and enjoyed the experience of living in tents, walking through wooded areas and bathing in cold streams. She also enjoyed climbing trees and had retained an interest in physical activity from childhood.

Gandhi also loved theatre and films. She also enjoyed classical music and had been introduced to a wider appreciation of music by Feroze, who taught her to listen more attentively to musical performances. Her interest in the arts included painting, crafts and traditional Indian handicrafts. She took a personal interest in art and craft exhibitions and supported the promotion of Indian handicrafts, particularly when they were not yet fashionable internationally.

She also enjoyed travelling and seeing unfamiliar places. Gandhi said that she enjoyed almost every country she visited, although the demanding schedule of a Prime Minister often made travel less pleasurable than it might otherwise have been. She appreciated the landscapes, architecture and customs of different regions and was interested in historical places. She was particularly drawn to mountains and forests, and enjoyed the opportunity to escape from formal surroundings during holidays.

Gandhi was not an enthusiastic cook. She explained that she had never regularly cooked meals and that the only dish she could confidently prepare was an egg. She recalled being taught to cook as a young girl, when she had been required to prepare a meal for her grandfather as a kind of test, but admitted that she had not developed the skill further. She joked that she was quite happy eating eggs and raw vegetables and did not think she would starve if she had to look after herself.

Gandhi was not particularly fashion-conscious, although she liked people to be well dressed. She believed that individuals should develop a style suited to their own personality rather than follow every changing fashion. Her own public appearance was strongly associated with the sari, especially handloom and khadi clothing. She continued to wear some saris that had belonged to her mother and disliked discarding clothes simply because they had become old. Gandhi also joked that her family sometimes became exasperated because she continued wearing garments long after they thought she should replace them. She enjoyed wearing different regional Indian costumes on informal occasions, although she did not think they were necessarily suitable for official duties.

== Views on women ==
In 1952 in a letter to her American friend Dorothy Norman, Gandhi wrote: "I am in no sense a feminist, but I believe in women being able to do everything... Given the opportunity to develop, capable Indian women have come to the top at once." While this statement appears paradoxical, it reflects Gandhi's complex feelings toward her gender and feminism. Her egalitarian upbringing with her cousins helped contribute to her sense of natural equality. "Flying kites, climbing trees, playing marbles with her boy cousins, Indira said she hardly knew the difference between a boy and a girl until the age of twelve."

Gandhi did not often discuss her gender but she involved herself in women's issues before becoming the prime minister. Before her election as prime minister, she became active in the organisational wing of the Congress party, working in part in the Women's Department. In 1956, she had an active role in setting up the Congress Party's Women's Section. Unsurprisingly, a lot of her involvement stemmed from her father. As an only child, Gandhi naturally stepped into the political light. And, as a woman, she naturally helped head the Women's section of the Congress Party. She often tried to organise women to involve themselves in politics. Although rhetorically Gandhi may have attempted to separate her political success from her gender, she did involve herself in women's organisations. The political parties in India paid substantial attention to Gandhi's gender before she became prime minister, hoping to use her for political gain. Even though men surrounded her during her upbringing, she still had a female role model as a child. Several books on Gandhi reference her interest in Joan of Arc. In Gandhi's own accounts through her letters, she wrote to her friend Dorothy Norman, in 1952 she wrote: "At about eight or nine I was taken to France; Jeanne d'Arc became a great heroine of mine. She was one of the first people I read about with enthusiasm." Another historian recounts Indira's comparison of herself to Joan of Arc: "Indira developed a fascination for Joan of Arc, telling her aunt, 'Someday I am going to lead my people to freedom just as Joan of Arc did'!" Gandhi's linking of herself to Joan of Arc presents a model for historians to assess Gandhi. As one writer said: "The Indian people were her children; members of her family were the only people capable of leading them."

Gandhi had been swept up in the call for Indian independence since she was born in 1917. Thus by 1947, she was already well immersed in politics, and by 1966, when she first assumed the position of prime minister, she had held several cabinet positions in her father's office. Her advocacy for women's rights began with her help in establishing the Congress Party's Women's Section. In 1956, she wrote in a letter: "It is because of this that I am taking a much more active part in politics. I have to do a great deal of touring in order to set up the Congress Party Women's Section, and am on numerous important committees." Gandhi spent a great deal of time throughout the 1950s helping to organise women. She wrote to Norman in 1959, irritable that women had organised around the communist cause but had not mobilised for the Indian cause: "The women, whom I have been trying to organise for years, had always refused to come into politics. Now they are out in the field." Once appointed president in 1959, she "travelled relentlessly, visiting remote parts of the country that had never before received a VIP... she talked to women, asked about child health and welfare, inquired after the crafts of the region" Her actions throughout her ascent to power clearly reflect a desire to mobilise women. Gandhi did not see the purpose of feminism. She saw her own success as a woman, and also noted that: "Given the opportunity to develop, capable Indian women have come to the top at once."

Gandhi felt guilty about her inability to fully devote her time to her children. She noted that her main problem in office was how to balance her political duties with tending to her children, and "stressed that motherhood was the most important part of her life." At another point, she went into more detail: "To a woman, motherhood is the highest fulfilment ... To bring a new being into this world, to see its perfection and to dream of its future greatness is the most moving of all experiences and fills one with wonder and exaltation." Her domestic initiatives did not necessarily reflect favourably on Indian women. Gandhi did not make a special effort to appoint women to cabinet positions. She did not appoint any women to full cabinet rank during her terms in office. Yet despite this, many women saw Gandhi as a symbol for feminism and an image of women's power.

== Awards and honours ==
=== National honours ===
- India:
  - Bharat Ratna (1971)

=== Foreign honours ===
- Bulgaria:
  - Order of the Rose, Collar (1967)
- Zambia:
  - Order of the Grand Companion of Freedom, Grand Commander (1976)
- Bhutan:
  - Order of Great Victory of the Thunder Dragon, First Class (1985, posthumous)
- Cuba:
  - Order of José Martí (1985, posthumous)
- Vietnam:
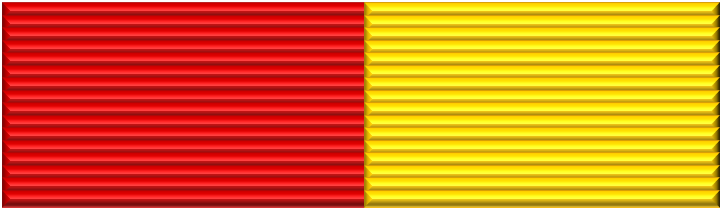
  - Gold Star Order (1985, posthumous)
- Bangladesh:
  - Bangladesh Freedom Honour (2011, posthumous)

=== Other awards ===
- Gold Olympic Order by the International Olympic Committee (1983)

=== Posthumous honours ===
- Lenin Peace Prize was posthumously awarded to her in 1985
- Indian National Congress established the annual Indira Gandhi Award for National Integration in 1985, given in her memory on her death anniversary.
- The Lokmanya Tilak National Award was posthumously conferred on her in 1985.
- The Indira Gandhi Memorial Trust constituted the annual Indira Gandhi Prize, which was first awarded in 1986.
- In 2019, Time created 89 new covers to celebrate women of the year starting from 1920; it chose her for 1976.
- The international airport at New Delhi is named Indira Gandhi International Airport in her honour.
- The Indira Gandhi National Open University, the largest university in the world, is also named after her.
- The southernmost Indira Point (6.74678°N 93.84260°E) is named after Gandhi.

== Legacy ==
American veteran politician Henry A. Kissinger had described Indira Gandhi as being an "Iron lady", a nickname that became associated with her tough personality. After leading India to victory against Pakistan in the Bangladesh Liberation War in 1971, President V. V. Giri awarded Gandhi with India's highest civilian honour, the Bharat Ratna. In 2011, the Bangladesh Freedom Honour, Bangladesh's highest civilian award for foreign nationals, was posthumously conferred on Gandhi for her "outstanding contributions" to Bangladesh's Liberation War.

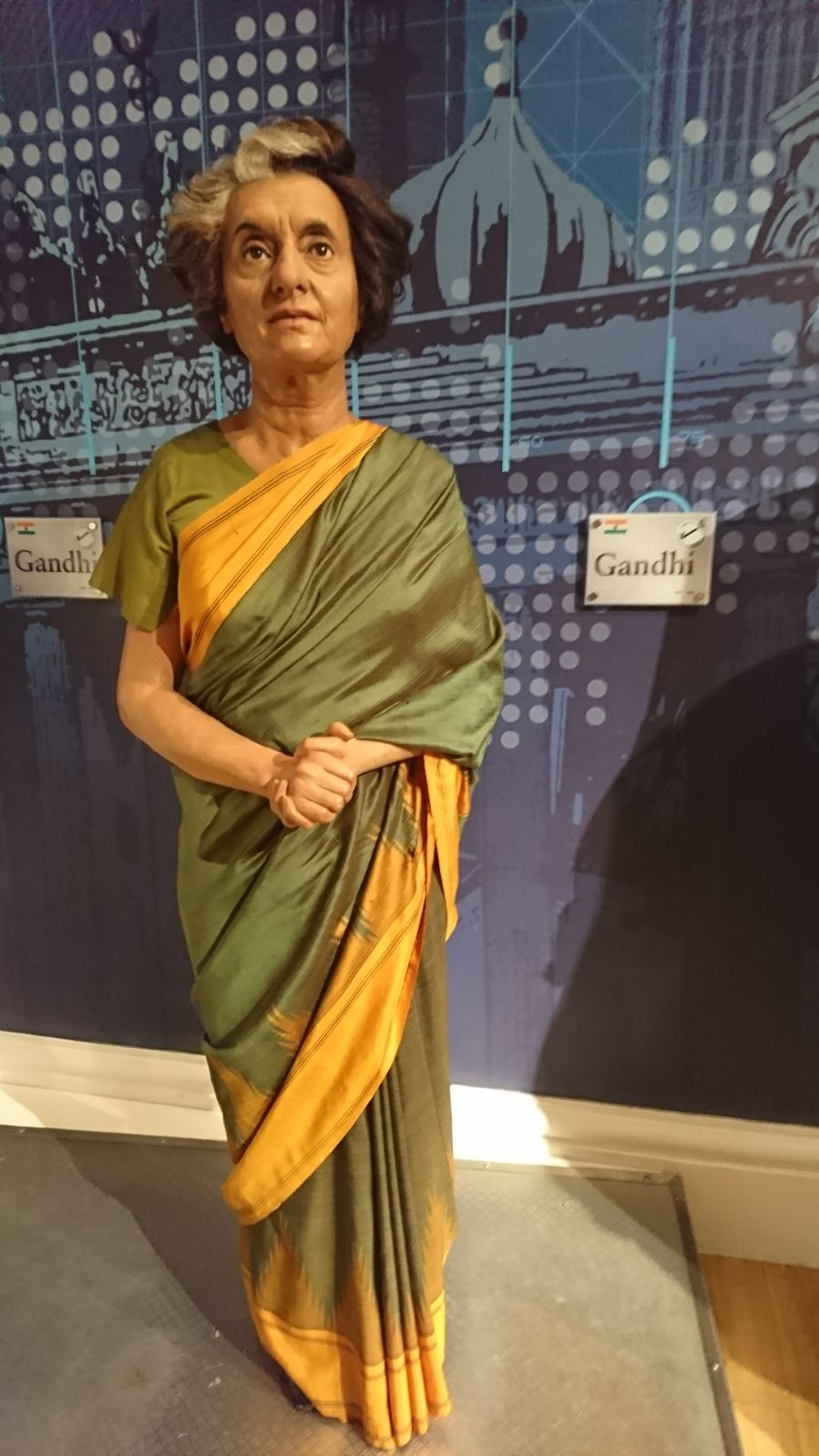
Gandhi's wax statue at Madame Tussauds in London

Gandhi's main legacy was standing firm in the face of American pressure to defeat Pakistan and turn East Pakistan into independent Bangladesh. She was responsible for India joining the group of countries with nuclear weapons. Although India being officially part of the Non-Aligned Movement, she gave Indian foreign policy a tilt towards the Soviet bloc. In 1999, Gandhi was named "Woman of the Millennium" in an online poll organised by the BBC. In 2012, she was ranked number seven on Outlook India's poll of the Greatest Indian.

Being at the forefront of Indian politics for decades, Gandhi left a powerful legacy on Indian politics. Similarly, some of her actions have also caused controversies. One of the criticisms concerns her rule to have damaged internal party democracy in the Congress party. Her detractors accuse her of weakening State chief ministers and thereby weakening the federal structure, weakening the independence of the judiciary, and weakening her cabinet by vesting power in her secretariat and her sons. Gandhi is also associated with fostering a culture of nepotism in Indian politics and in India's institutions. She is also almost singularly associated with the period of emergency rule, described by some as a "dark period" in Indian democracy. The Forty-second Amendment of the Constitution of India which was adopted during the emergency can also be regarded as part of her legacy. Although judicial challenges and non-Congress governments tried to water down the amendment, the amendment still stands.

She was the only woman to occupy the office of the prime minister of India and in 2020, Gandhi was named by Time magazine among the world's 100 powerful women who defined the last century. Shakti Sthal means a place of strength and is a monument to her.

== In popular culture ==
While portrayals of Indira Gandhi by actors in Indian cinema have generally been avoided, with filmmakers using back-shots, silhouettes and voiceovers to give impressions of her character, several films surrounding her tenure, policies or assassination have been made.

These include Aandhi (1975) by Gulzar, Kissa Kursi Ka (1975) by Amrit Nahata, Nasbandi (1978) by I. S. Johar, Maachis (1996) by Gulzar, Hazaaron Khwaishein Aisi (2003) by Sudhir Mishra, Hawayein (2003) by Ammtoje Mann, Des Hoyaa Pardes (2004) by Manoj Punj, Kaya Taran (2004) by Sashi Kumar, Amu (2005) by Shonali Bose, Kaum De Heere (2014) by Ravinder Ravi, 47 to 84 (2014) by Rajiv Sharma, Punjab 1984 (2014) by Anurag Singh, The Fourth Direction (2015) by Gurvinder Singh, Dharam Yudh Morcha (2016) by Naresh S. Garg, 31 October (2016) by Shivaji Lotan Patil, Baadshaho (2017) by Milan Luthria, Toofan Singh (2017) by Baghal Singh, Sonchiriya (2019) by Abhishek Chaubey, Shukranu (2020) by Bishnu Dev Halder. Aandhi, Kissa Kursi Ka and Nasbandi are notable for having been released during Gandhi's lifetime and were subject to censorship on exhibition during the Emergency.

Indus Valley to Indira Gandhi is a 1970 Indian two-part documentary film by S. Krishnaswamy which traces the history of India from the earliest times of the Indus Valley Civilisation to the prime ministership of Indira Gandhi. The Films Division of India produced Our Indira, a 1973 short documentary film directed by S.N.S. Sastry showing the beginning of her first tenure as PM and her speeches from the Stockholm Conference.

Pradhanmantri (lit. 'Prime Minister'), a 2013 Indian documentary television series which aired on ABP News and covers the various policies and political tenures of Indian PMs, includes the tenureship of Gandhi in the episodes "Indira Gandhi Becomes PM", "Split in Congress Party", "Story before Indo-Pakistani War of 1971", "Indo-Pakistani War of 1971 and Birth of Bangladesh", "1975–77 State of Emergency in India", and "Indira Gandhi back as PM and Operation Blue Star" with Navni Parihar portraying the role of Gandhi. Parihar also portrays Gandhi in the 2021 Indian film Bhuj: The Pride of India which is based on the India–Pakistan war of 1971.

The taboo surrounding the depiction of Indira Gandhi in Indian cinema has begun to dissipate in recent years with actors portraying her in films. Notable portrayals include: Sarita Choudhury in Midnight's Children (2012); Mandeep Kohli in Jai Jawaan Jai Kisaan (2015); Supriya Vinod in Indu Sarkar (2017), NTR: Kathanayakudu/NTR: Mahanayakudu (2019) and Yashwantrao Chavan – Bakhar Eka Vaadalaachi (2014); Flora Jacob in Raid (2018), Thalaivi (2021) and Radhe Shyam (2022), Kishori Shahane in PM Narendra Modi (2019), Avantika Akerkar in Thackeray (2019) and 83 (2021), Supriya Karnik in Main Mulayam Singh Yadav (2021), Lara Dutta in Bell Bottom (2021), Fatima Sana Shaikh in Sam Bahadur (2023) and Kangana Ranaut in Emergency (2025).

The phrase "indiragandi" is used in Turkish slang as a way to convey the action of getting money through corruption or otherwise unethical means. This is largely due to the word "indirmek" (English: take down) being used similarly in slang, although the corruption scandal that Indira Gandhi presided over is also a factor.

== Bibliography ==
Book written by Indira Gandhi

- My Truth (1980), Orient Paperback, ISBN 978-81-709446-8-3

Books on Indira Gandhi

- My Years with Indira Gandhi by P. C. Alexander, Orient Paperbacks, ISBN 978-81-709444-2-3, ISBN 978-81-709444-2-3
- Indira Gandhi by H. Y. Sharada Prasad, Penguin India, ISBN 978-01-433328-8-6
- Indira Gandhi – Tryst with Power by Nayantara Sahgal, Penguin India, ISBN 978-01-430673-5-1
- Indira: India's Most Powerful Prime Minister by Sagarika Ghose, ISBN 978-93-862283-4-5

== See also ==
- List of national presidents of the Indian National Congress
- List of assassinated Indian politicians
- List of elected and appointed female heads of state and government
- List of heads of state and government who suspended the constitution
- List of heads of state and government who were assassinated or executed
- List of honorary professors of Moscow State University
- List of recipients of the Gold Star Order
- List of heads of state and government Nobel nominees

== Notes, references and sources ==
=== Sources ===
- Skard, Torild (2014). "Indira Gandhi". Women of Power: Half a Century of Female Presidents and Prime Ministers Worldwide. Bristol: Policy Press. ISBN 978-1-4473-1578-0.
- Barbara Somervill (2007). Indira Gandhi: Political Leader in India. Capstone Publishers. ISBN 978-0-7565-1885-1.
- Katherine Frank (2010). Indira: the life of Indira Nehru Gandhi. HarperCollins. ISBN 978-0-00-737250-8.
- Meena Agrawal (2005). Indira Gandhi. Diamond Pocket Books. ISBN 978-81-288-0901-9.
- Pranay Gupte (2012). Mother India: A Political Biography of Indira Gandhi. Penguin Books. ISBN 978-0-14-306826-6.
- Pupul Jayakar (1997). Indira Gandhi: A Biography. Penguin Books. ISBN 978-0-14-011462-1.
- Yogendra Kumar Malik (1988). India: The Years of Indira Gandhi. BRILL Publishers. ISBN 978-90-04-08681-4.

== Bibliography ==
- Guha, Ramachandra. India after Gandhi: The History of the World's Largest Democracy (2007) ISBN 978-0-06-019881-7
- Hart, Henry C., ed. Indira Gandhi's India (Routledge, 2019). excerpt Archived 21 September 2021 at the Wayback Machine
- Jaffrelot, Christophe; Anil, Pratinav (2021). India's First Dictatorship: The Emergency, 1975-77. Oxford: Oxford University Press. ISBN 978-9390351602.
- Jayakar, Pupul. Indira Gandhi: An Intimate Biography (1992) ISBN 978-0-679-42479-6
- Malhotra, Inder. Indira Gandhi: A personal and political biography (1991) ISBN 0-340-53548-2
- Malone, David M., C. Raja Mohan, and Srinath Raghavan, eds. The Oxford handbook of Indian foreign policy (2015) excerpt Archived 15 September 2021 at the Wayback Machine pp 104–111.
- Mansingh, Surjit. India′s Search for Power: Indira Gandhi′s Foreign Policy 1966–1982 (1984) online
- Ved Mehta, A Family Affair: India Under Three Prime Ministers (1982) ISBN 0-19-503118-0
- Ramesh, Jairam. Indira Gandhi: a life in nature (Simon and Schuster, 2017); on environmentalism
- Sahgal, Nayantara. Indira Gandhi: Tryst with Power (Penguin Random House India, 2017).
- Tharoor, Shashi. Reasons of state: political development and India's foreign policy under Indira Gandhi, 1966–1977 (1982) online
- Shourie, Arun (1984). Mrs Gandhi's second reign. New Delhi: Vikas.
- Dsouza, Chris Emmanuel. Bandh Samrat: Tales of Eternal Rebel George Fernandes (Cleverfox Publications, 2022) ISBN 9789356480810 pp 34–42
- Indira Gandhi – Iron Lady of India by Sulakshi Thelikorala
- Thakur, Janadan (1977). All The Prime Minister’s Men . Vikas Publishing. 1977. ISBN 9780706905663.

Party political offices
Preceded by Uchharangrai Navalshankar Dhebar	President of the Indian National Congress; 1959	Succeeded by Neelam Sanjiva Reddy
Preceded by Devakanta Barua	President of the Indian National Congress; 1978–1984	Succeeded by Rajiv Gandhi
Political offices
Preceded by B. V. Keskar	Union Minister of Information and Broadcasting; 9 June 1964 – 11 January 1966	Succeeded by Kodardas Kalidas Shah
Preceded by Gulzarilal Nanda; Acting	Prime Minister of India; 24 January 1966 – 24 March 1977	Succeeded by Morarji Desai
Preceded by Gulzarilal Nanda; Acting	Chair of the Planning Commission; 24 January 1966 – 24 March 1977	Succeeded by Morarji Desai
Preceded by Mahommedali Currim Chagla	Union Minister of External Affairs; 6 September 1967 – 13 February 1969	Succeeded by Dinesh Singh
Preceded by Morarji Desai	Union Minister of Finance; 16 January 1969 – 15 March 1971	Succeeded by Yashwantrao Chavan
Preceded by Morarji Desai	Union Minister of Home Affairs; 27 June 1970 – 4 February 1973	Succeeded by Yashwantrao Chavan
Preceded by Swaran Singh	Union Minister of Defence; 1 December 1975 – 25 December 1975	Succeeded by Bansi Lal
Preceded by Charan Singh	Prime Minister of India; 14 January 1980 – 31 October 1984	Succeeded by Rajiv Gandhi
Preceded by Charan Singh	Chair of the Planning Commission; 14 January 1980 – 31 October 1984	Succeeded by Rajiv Gandhi
Preceded by Chidambaram Subramaniam	Union Minister of Defence; 16 January 1980 – 15 January 1982	Succeeded by Ramaswamy Venkataraman
Preceded by Narasimha Rao	Union Minister of External Affairs; 19 July 1984 – 31 October 1984	Succeeded by Rajiv Gandhi
