= Madhav Gadgil =

Indian ecologist (1942–2026)

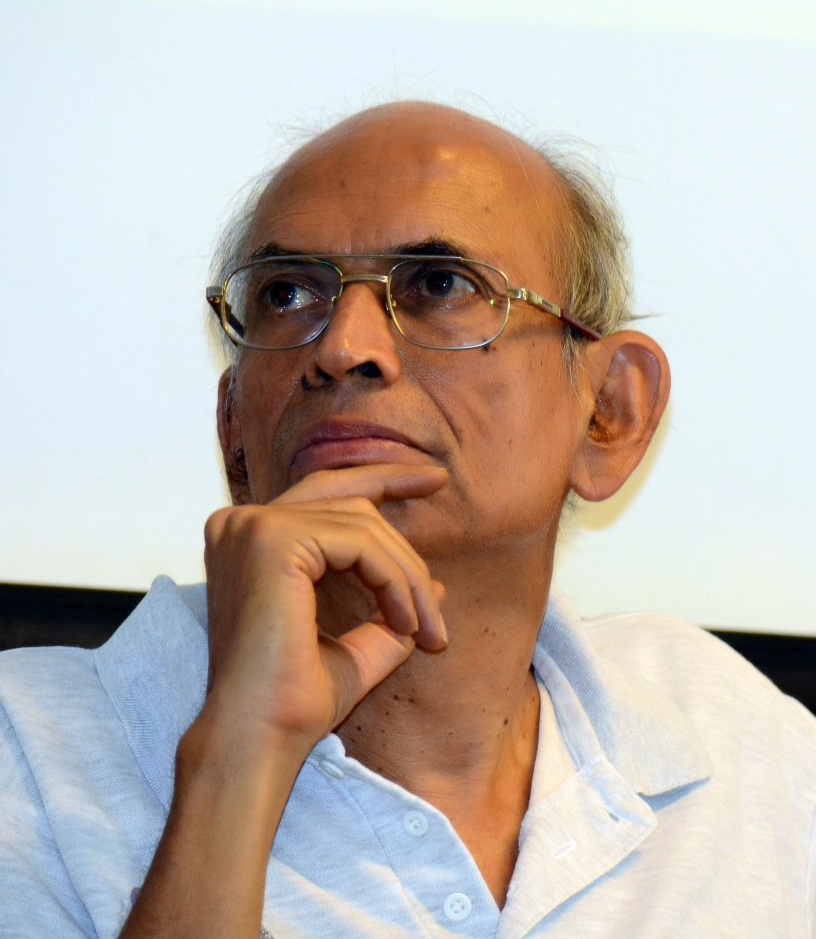
- Gadgil in 2016
- Born: Madhav Dhananjaya Gadgil; 24 May 1942; Poona, Bombay Province, British India
- Died: 7 January 2026 (aged 83); Pune, Maharashtra, India
- Resting place: Vaikuntha Crematorium, Pune; 18.5113°N 73.8449°E
- Citizenship: British Raj (1942–1947); India (since 1947)
- Education: University of Pune (B.Sc.); University of Mumbai (M.Sc.); Harvard University (Ph.D.)
- Known for: Gadgil Commission
- Spouse: Sulochana Gadgil
- Father: Dhananjay Ramchandra Gadgil
- Awards: Awards and recognition
- Scientific career
- Fields: Ecology; human ecology; conservation biology; ecological history
- Workplaces: Harvard University; Centre for Ecological Sciences; Indian Institute of Science
- Thesis: Life History Strategies: A Theoretical Investigation (1969)
- Doctoral advisor: William H. Bossert

Madhav Dhananjaya Gadgil (24 May 1942 – 7 January 2026) was an Indian ecologist, academic, writer, columnist and the founder of the Centre for Ecological Sciences, a research unit of the Indian Institute of Science. He was a member of the Scientific Advisory Council to the Prime Minister of India and the Head of the Western Ghats Ecology Expert Panel (WGEEP) of 2010, popularly known as the Gadgil Commission.

Gadgil was a recipient of the Volvo Environment Prize and the Tyler Prize for Environmental Achievement. The Government of India awarded him the fourth highest civilian award of the Padma Shri in 1981 and followed it up with the third highest award of the Padma Bhushan in 2006. He received the Champions of the Earth in 2024.

== Early life and academic career ==
Gadgil was born on 24 May 1942 in Pune, in the western Indian state of Maharashtra. His parents were Pramila and Dhananjay Ramchandra Gadgil, a Cambridge scholar, economist, former director of the Gokhale Institute and the author of the Gadgil formula. He graduated in biology from Fergusson College of the University of Pune in 1963, and secured a master's degree in zoology from the Mumbai University in 1965.

=== Harvard years ===
Gadgil was encouraged to join Harvard University by Giles Mead, then curator of fishes at the Harvard Museum of Comparative Zoology. Initially intending to do research under Mead, Gadgil later changed subjects by hearing lectures of E. O. Wilson, "the brightest young star in the ecology-evolution end of biology at Harvard at that time," and subsequently did his doctoral research on mathematical ecology and fish behaviour, under the guidance of William Bossert, one of Wilson's former students.

It earned him a PhD in 1969. Subsequently, he received a Fellowship from IBM to continue his work as a research fellow at the Harvard Computing Center and simultaneously worked as a lecturer of biology at the university for two years.

=== Return to India ===
Gadgil returned to India in 1971 and took up a job as a scientific officer at Agharkar Research Institute of the Maharashtra Association for Cultivation of Science, Pune where he stayed for two years. In 1973, he joined the Indian Institute of Science (IISc), Bengaluru, starting an association that would stretch for over thirty years, superannuating from the institute as its chairman in 2004. During this period, he established two research centres at IISc, the Centre of Theoretical Studies and the Centre for Ecological Studies. He also worked as a visiting professor at Stanford University (1991) and the University of California, Berkeley (1995). After his retirement from IISc, he went back to Pune in 2004 to resume his association with Agharkar Research Institute and held the Damodar Dharmanand Kosambi chair of the visiting research professor at the University of Goa.

In 1976, when the Government of Karnataka decided to look into protecting the bamboo resources of the state, Gadgil was asked to conduct a study, which is reported to have influenced the government to curb the subsidies provided to forest-based industries. A decade later, in 1986, he was appointed a member of the Scientific Advisory Council to Prime Minister of India, a post he held till 1990. During this period, he assisted the efforts to establish the first biosphere reserve in the country at the Nilgiris in 1986. In 1998, he was appointed the chairman of the Science and Technology Advisory Panel of Global Environment Facility, an agency under the United Nations. He held the chair till 2002. He also served as a member of the environmental education panel of the National Council of Educational Research and Training (NCERT) and as a member of the National Advisory Council. He was a member of the National Tiger Conservation Authority and was the chairman of the committee proposing Environmental Education Curriculum at School level. In 2010, when the Government of India constituted an expert panel, Western Ghats Ecology Expert Panel (WGEEP), to examine the ecological issues related to the Western Ghats, he was selected as the chairman of the panel.

== Personal life and death ==
Gadgil, an active sportsman during his college years, held the Maharashtra State Junior and Pune University high jump records in 1959 and 1961 respectively. He has also represented Pune University at the All India University Athletic meet. He was married to Sulochana Gadgil, a meteorologist and a Harvard scholar, whom he met during his Fergusson College years. The couple has a daughter, who is a journalist and also Spanish teacher, and a son who is a mathematician. The family lives in Pune, his home town. His life story has been recorded in a biographical book, Vidnyanyatri – Dr. Madhav Gadgil, written in Marathi by A. P. Deshpande.

Gadgil died in Pune on 7 January 2026, at the age of 83.

== Legacy ==
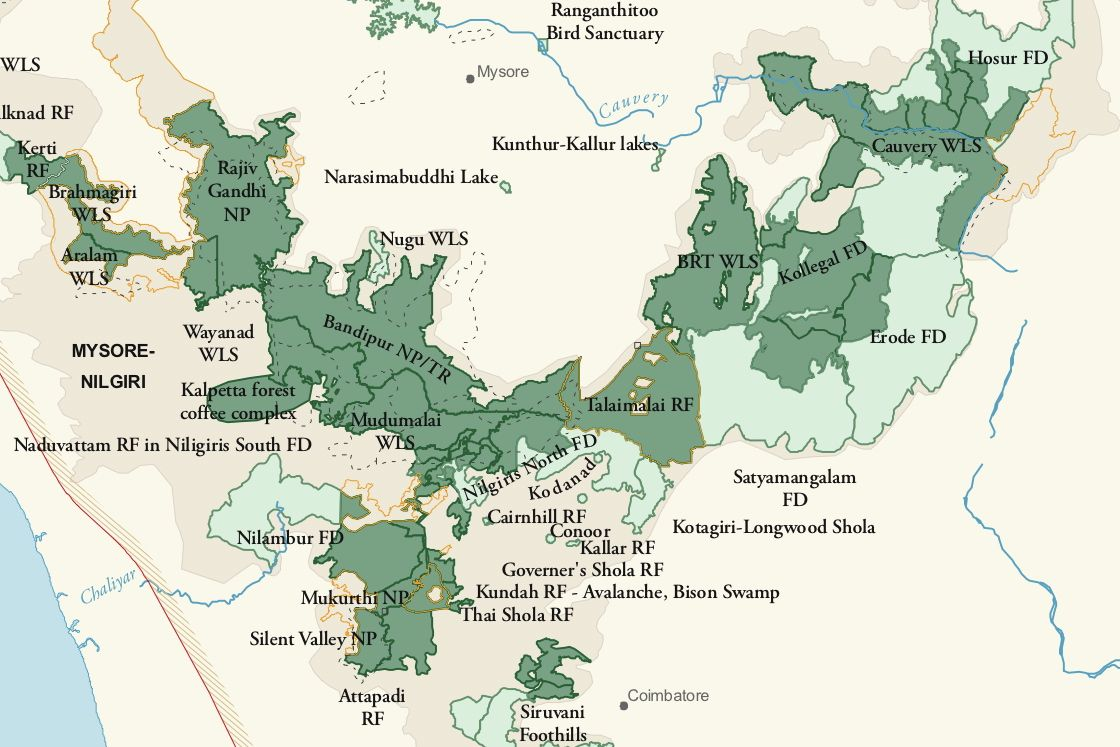
Nilgiris Biosphere Reserve

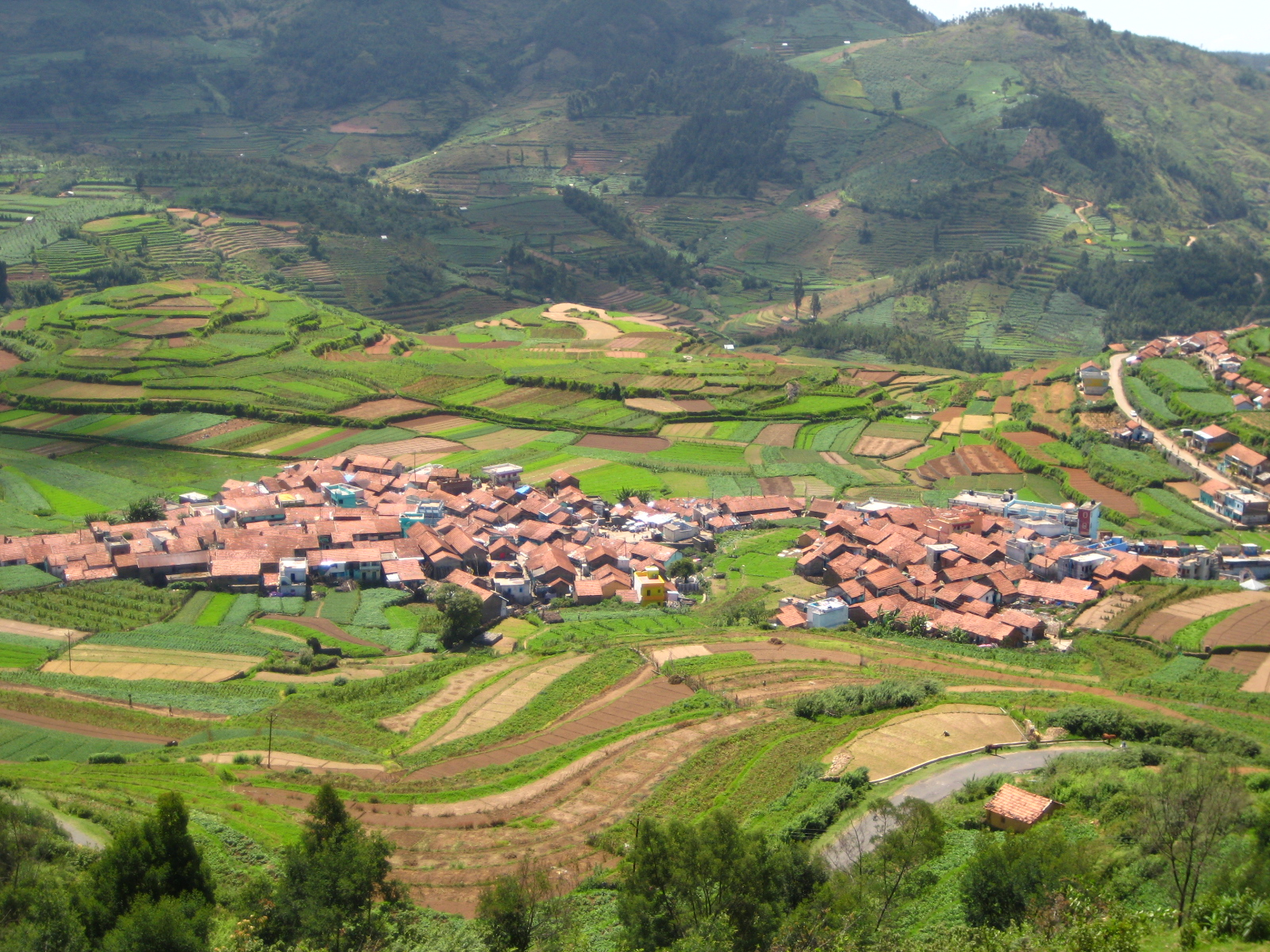
Poombarai village in the Western Ghats.

One of the major contributions of Gadgil is his effort towards the preservation of ecology of India. His early researches in the 1980s have helped in the identification of the Nilgiris as the first biosphere reserve in India. As the chairman of the Western Ghats Ecology Expert Panel (WGEEP), which later came to be known as the Gadgil Commission, he submitted a report in 2011, marking around 64 percent of the Western Ghats region as Ecologically Sensitive Area (ESA). The report attracted support and dissension, the environmentalists welcoming the recommendations and the state governments of the neighbouring states and the Syro-Malabar Catholic Church of Kerala disapproving it. This paved way for the subsequent Kasturirangan Commission, which diluted the recommendations to a level more acceptable to the state governments. He has been credited by many with the introduction of quantitative investigations of ecology and animal behaviour in India and for including humans as a vital part of ecosystems. His contributions, as a member of the draft committee, has been reported in the preparation of the Biological Diversity Act 2002 and the manual he prepared for the People's Biodiversity Registers has been accepted by the National Biodiversity Authority. He was still associated with the Authority in the preparation of a biodiversity inventory at the local bodies' level.

Gadgil is known to have done extensive researches in the areas of population biology, conservation biology, human ecology and ecological history. His researches have been documented by over 250 scientific articles, published in various journals and magazines. He developed a penchant for writing at an early age and his first publication was a series of ten articles on animal behaviour, published in Srishtidnyan, a Marathi language science magazine, when he was studying in the 10th standard. His doctoral thesis is reported to have been a citation classic. He published his first book in English, This Fissured Land, a book on the ecological history of India, in 1992. The next book, Ecology and Equity: The Use and Abuse of Nature in Contemporary India, again co-authored by Ramachandra Guha, was released in 1995, followed by Nurturing Biodiversity: An Indian Agenda, a book co-authored by P. R. Seshagiri Rao, in 1998. In 2005, he published two books, Diversity : The cornerstone of life and Ecological Journeys. As a part of his responsibilities as a Pew Fellow in Conservation and the Environment, he has contributed towards the preparation of People's Biodiversity Registers and has published a manual, People's Biodiversity Registers: A Methodology Manual. Some of his books have been translated into many languages and serve as texts for academic studies. He has also published two books, Nisarganiyojan Lokasahabhagane being one among them, and over 40 articles in Marathi and handled a fortnightly column on natural history, in The Hindu, from 1999 till 2004. He handled a monthly column in the Marathi daily, Sakal.

Books

- Madhav Gadgil, Ramachandra Guha (1992). This Fissured Land. Oxford University Press India. p. 312. ISBN 9780198077442.
- Madhav Gadgil, Ramachandra Guha (1995). Ecology and Equity: The Use and Abuse of Nature in Contemporary India. Routeledge. p. 223. ISBN 978-0415125246.
- Madhav Gadgil, P. R. Seshagiri Rao (1998). Nurturing Biodiversity: An Indian Agenda. Centre for Environment Education. p. 163. ISBN 9788186385135.
- Madhav Gadgil (2005). Diversity : The cornerstone of life. Vigyan Prasar. p. 64. ISBN 8174800263.
- Madhav Gadgil (2005). Ecological Journeys. Orient Blackswan. p. 257. ISBN 9788178241128.
- Madhav Gadgil (2013), Science, democracy and ecology in India. Nehru Memorial Museum & Library ISBN 978-8187614760

== Awards and recognition ==
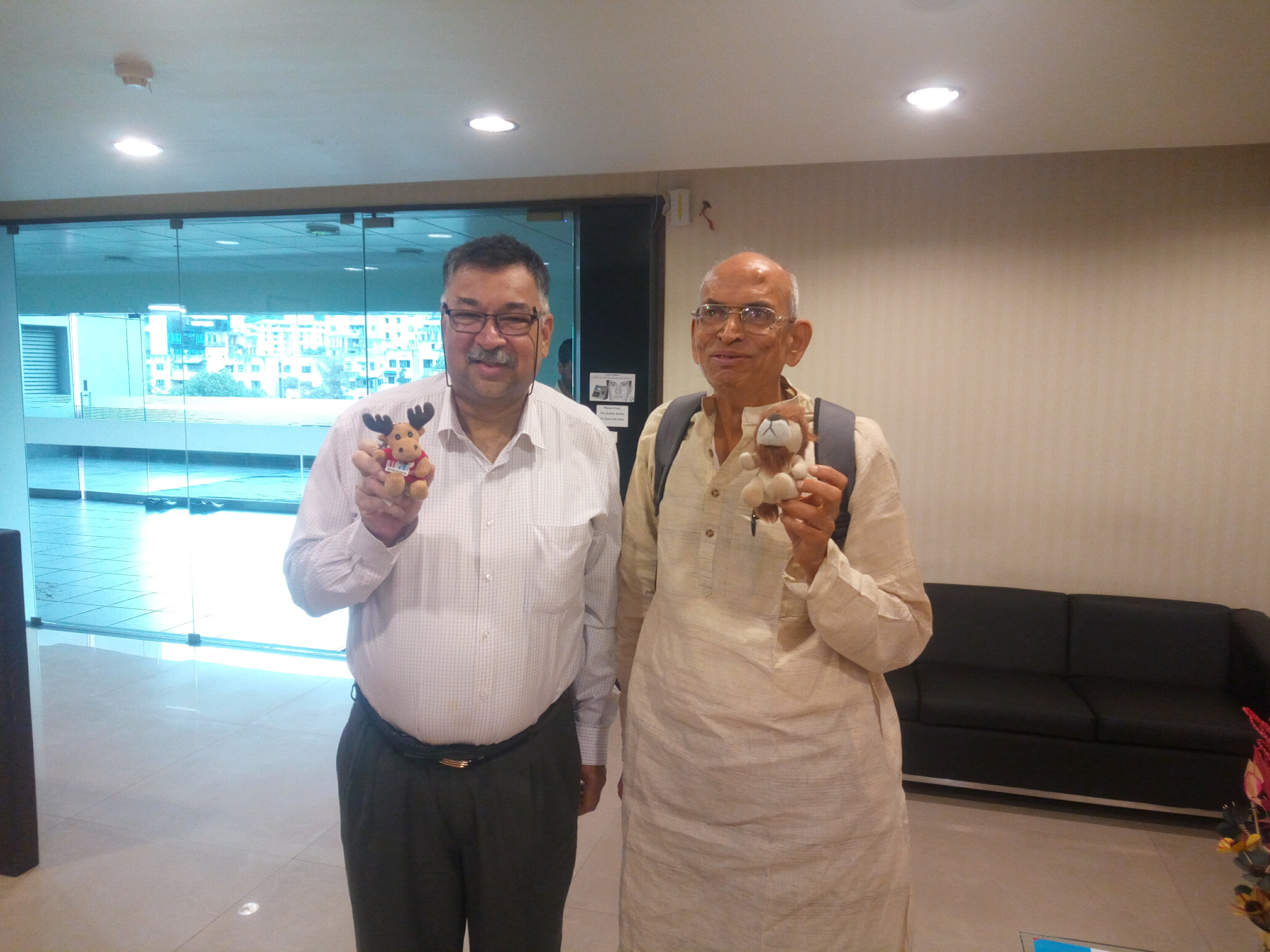
Dr. Madhav Gadgil (right) and Col. Ashwin Baindur (left, in white shirt) at a Wikidata workshop in Pune on 18 September 2017

The Indian National Science Academy (INSA) elected him as their Fellow in 1984. Six years later, the two other major science academies of India, The Indian Academy of Sciences (IAS) and the National Academy of Sciences, India (NASI), followed suit by electing him as a Fellow in 1990. He was Fellow of the Third World Academy of Sciences (TWAS), an honorary Fellow of the Association for Tropical Biology and Conservation (ATBC) and a recipient of the National Environment Fellowship of the Ministry of Environment and Forests for his field research in the Western Ghats. He was elected as a Foreign Associate of the US National Academy of Sciences in 1991 and he served as a member of the British Ecological Society and Ecological Society of America.

The Government of India awarded him the fourth highest civilian honour of the Padma Shri in 1981 and the Council of Scientific and Industrial Research (CSIR), an autonomous government agency awarded him Shanti Swarup Bhatnagar Prize for Science and Technology, the highest Indian award in the Science and Technology sector, in 1986. In between, in 1983, the Government of Karnataka honoured him with Rajyotsava Prashasthi, their second highest civilian award. His alma mater, Harvard University, presented him with the Harvard Centennial Medal, an annual honour given to its alumni for their achievements in their respective field of service, in 2002. The next year, he shared the 2003 Volvo Environment Prize of the Volvo Environment Prize Foundation, with Muhammad Yunus, the social entrepreneur from Bangladesh.

Gadgil received the Padma Bhushan, the third highest civilian award from the Government of India in 2006 and the H. K. Firodia award of the H. K. Firodia Foundation reached him a year later, in 2007. The Central University of Orissa honoured him with the degree of Doctor of Science (Honoris Causa) in 2013 and The Energy and Resources Institute (TERI) recognised the contributions of the Western Ghats Ecology Experts Panel (WGEEP) and its chairman with the Georgescu-Roegen Award in 2014. The University of Southern California awarded him the John and Alice Tyler Prize for Environmental Achievement in 2015, which he shared with Jane Lubchenco, a Distinguished Professor of Oregon State University, making him the second Indian, after M. S. Swaminathan, to receive the Prize. He is also a recipient of the Vikram Sarabhai Award and Ishwarchandra Vidyasagar Award.

He received the Fergusson Gaurav Puraskar 2019, for being an Outstanding Alumnus from his Alma Mater, Fergusson College on 6 January 2019. The United Nations awarded him the Champions of the Earth award in 2024.

== Eponymy ==
Elaeocarpus gadgilii, is a tree species described in 2021 from the Nelliampathy hills in Palakkad district of Kerala, India named in honour of him. A species of frog, Micrixalus gadgili, is also named after him.
