= Economic policy of the Indira Gandhi government =

The economic policy of the Indira Gandhi premiership was characterized by moderate tax increases on higher income Indians, bank nationalisation, and the green revolution. Gandhi presided over three Five-Year Plans as Prime Minister, two of which succeeded in meeting the targeted growth.

There is considerable debate regarding whether Gandhi was a socialist on principle or out of political expediency. Sunanda K. Datta-Ray described her as "a master of rhetoric...often more posture than policy", while The Times journalist, Peter Hazelhurst, famously quipped that Gandhi's socialism was "slightly left of self-interest." Critics have focused on the contradictions in the evolution of her stance towards communism; Gandhi being known for her anti-communist stance in the 1950s with Meghnad Desai even describing her as "the scourge of [India's] Communist Party." Yet, she later forged close relations with Indian communists even while using the army to break the Naxalites. In this context, Gandhi was accused of formulating populist policies to suit her political needs; being seemingly against the rich and big business while preserving the status quo in order to manipulate the support of the left at times of political insecurity, such as the late 1960s. Although Gandhi came to be viewed in time as the scourge of the right-wing and reactionary political elements of India, leftist opposition to her policies emerged. As early as 1969, critics had begun accusing her of insincerity and machiavellianism. The Indian Libertarian wrote that: "it would be difficult to find a more machiavellian leftist than Mrs Indira Gandhi...for here is Machiavelli at its best in the person of a suave, charming and astute politician." Rosser wrote that "some have even seen the declaration of emergency rule in 1975 as a move to suppress [leftist] dissent against Gandhi's policy shift to the right." In the 1980s, Gandhi was accused of "betraying socialism" after the beginning of Operation Forward, an attempt at economic reform. Nevertheless, others were more convinced of Gandhi's sincerity and devotion to socialism. Pankaj Vohra noted that "even the late prime minister's critics would concede that the maximum number of legislations of social significance was brought about during her tenure...[and that] she lives in the hearts of millions of Indians who shared her concern for the poor and weaker sections and who supported her politics."

In summarizing the biographical works on Gandhi, Blema S. Steinberg concluded she was decidedly non-ideological. Only 7.4% (24) of the total 330 biographical extractions posit ideology as a reason for her policy choices. Steinberg noted Gandhi's association with socialism was superficial; only having a general and traditional commitment to the ideology, by way of her political and family ties. Gandhi personally had a fuzzy concept of socialism. In one of the early interviews she had given as Prime Minister, Gandhi had ruminated: "I suppose you could call me a socialist, but you have understand what we mean by that term...we used the word [socialism] because it came closest to what we wanted to do here – which is to eradicate poverty. You can call it socialism; but if by using that word we arouse controversy, I don't see why we should use it. I don't believe in words at all." Regardless of the debate over her ideology or lack of thereof, Gandhi remains a left-wing icon. She has been described by Hindustan Times columnist, Pankaj Vohra as "arguably the greatest mass leader of the last century." Her campaign slogan, Garibi Hatao ('Remove Poverty'), has become the iconic motto of the Indian National Congress. To the rural and urban poor, untouchables, minorities and women in India, Gandhi was "Indira Amma or Mother Indira."

== Green Revolution and the Fourth Five-Year Plan ==
Gandhi inherited a weak and troubled economy. Fiscal problems associated with the war with Pakistan in 1965, along with a drought-induced food crisis that spawned famines, had plunged India into the sharpest recession since independence. The government responded by taking steps to liberalise the economy and agreeing to the devaluation of the currency in return for the restoration of foreign aid. The economy managed to recover in 1966 and ended up growing at 4.1% over 1966–1969. Much of that growth however, was offset by the fact that the external aid promised by the United States government and the International Bank for Reconstruction and Development (IBRD), meant to ease the short-run costs of adjustment to a liberalised economy, never materialised. American policy makers had complained of continued restrictions imposed on the economy. At the same time, Indo-US relations were strained because of Gandhi's criticism of the American bombing campaign in Vietnam. In light of the circumstances, liberalisation became politically suspect and was soon abandoned. Grain diplomacy and currency devaluation became matters of intense national pride in India. After the bitter experience with Johnson, Gandhi decided not to request food aid in the future. Moreover, her government resolved never again to become "so vulnerably dependent" on aid, and painstakingly began building up substantial foreign exchange reserves. When food stocks slumped after poor harvests in 1972, the government made it a point to use foreign exchange to buy US wheat commercially rather than seek resumption of food aid.

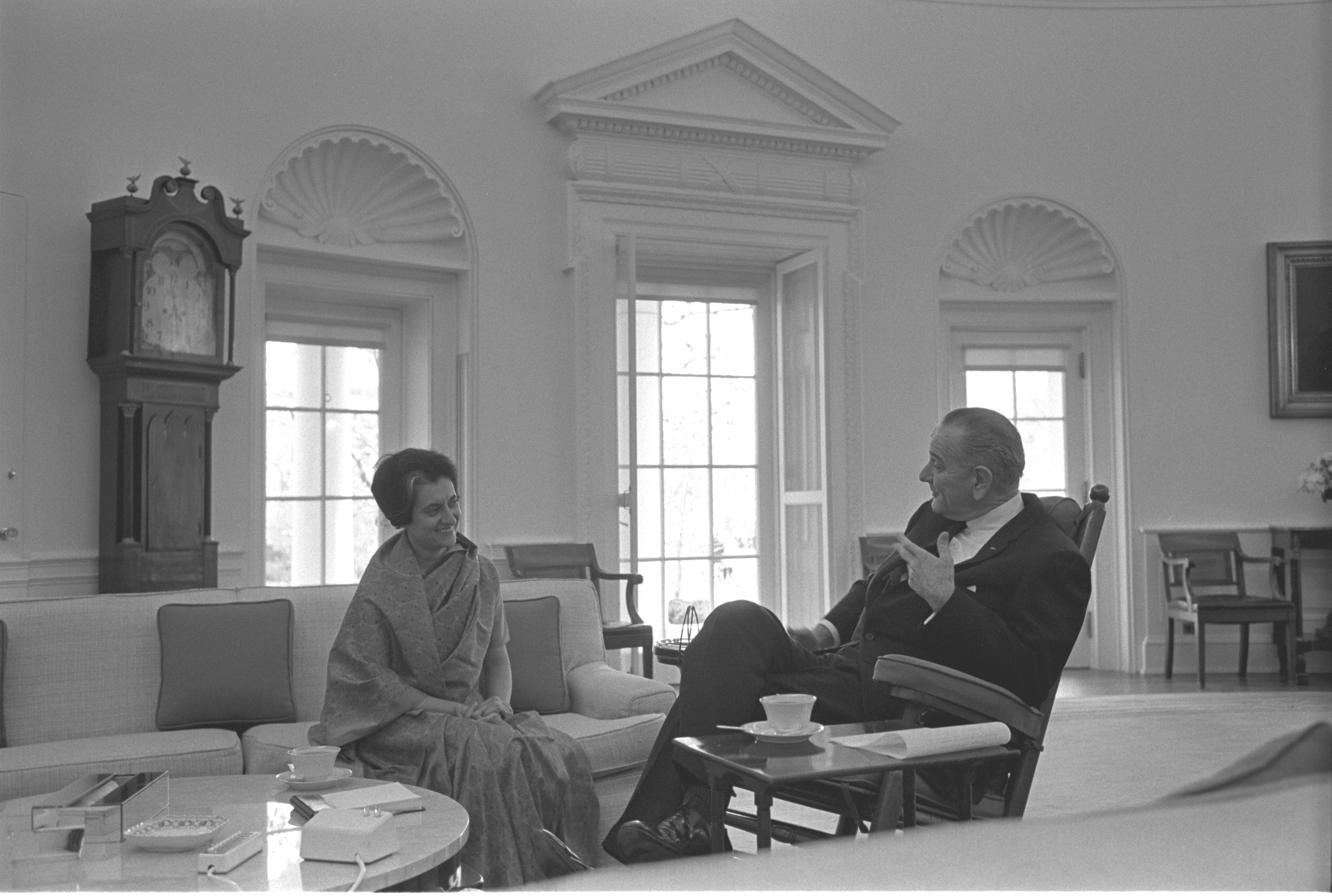
Indira Gandhi meeting President Lyndon B. Johnson in the Oval Office on 28 March 1966

The period of 1967–75 was characterised by socialist ascendency in India, which culminated in 1976 with the official declaration of state socialism. Gandhi not only abandoned the short-lived liberalisation programme but also aggressively expanded the public sector with new licensing requirements and other restrictions for industry. She began a new course by launching the Fourth Five-Year Plan in 1969. The government targeted growth at 5.7% while stating as its goals, "growth with stability and progressive achievement of self-reliance." The rationale behind the overall plan was Gandhi's Ten-Point Programme of 1967. This had been her first economic policy formulation, six months after coming to office. The programme emphasised greater state control of the economy with the understanding that government control assured greater welfare than private control. Related to this point were a set of policies that were meant to regulate the private sector. By the end of the 1960s, the reversal of the liberalisation process was complete, and India's policies were characterised as "protectionist as ever."

To deal with India's food problems, Gandhi expanded the emphasis on production of inputs to agriculture that had already been initiated by her father, Jawaharlal Nehru. The Green Revolution in India subsequently culminated under her government in the 1970s. It transformed the country from a nation heavily reliant on imported grains, and prone to famine, to one largely able to feed itself, and becoming successful in achieving its goal of food security. Gandhi had a personal motive in pursuing agricultural self-sufficiency, having found India's dependency on the U.S. for shipments of grains humiliating.

The economic period of 1967–1975 became significant for its major wave of nationalisation amidst increased regulation of the private sector. Some other objectives of the economic plan for that period were providing for the minimum needs of the community through a rural works program and the removal of the privy purses of the nobility. Those and many other goals of the 1967 programme were accomplished by 1974–1975. Nevertheless, the success of the overall economic plan was tempered by the fact that annual growth at 3.3–3.4% over 1969–1974 fell short of the targeted figure.

== State of Emergency and the Fifth Five-Year Plan ==
The Fifth Five-Year Plan (1974–79) was enacted in the backdrop of the state of emergency and the Twenty Point Program of 1975. The latter was the economic rationale of the emergency, a political act which has often been justified on economic grounds. In contrast to the reception of Gandhi's earlier economic plan, this one was criticized for being a "hastily thrown together wish list." Gandhi promised to reduce poverty by targeting the consumption levels of the poor and enact wide-ranging social and economic reforms. The government additionally targeted an annual growth of 4.4% over the period of the plan.

The measures of the emergency regime was able to halt the economic trouble of the early to mid-1970s, which had been marred by harvest failures, fiscal contraction, and the breakdown of the Bretton Woods system of fixed exchanged rate; the resulting turbulence in the foreign exchange markets being further accentuated by the oil shock of 1973. The government was even able to exceed the targeted growth figure with an annual growth rate of 5.0–5.2% over the five-year period of the plan (1974–79). The economy grew at the rate of 9% in 1975–76 alone, and the Fifth Plan, became the first plan during which the per capita income of the economy grew by over 5%.

== Operation Forward and the Sixth Five-Year Plan ==
Gandhi inherited a weak economy when she again became Prime Minister in 1980. The preceding year in 1979–80 under the Janata Party government had led to the strongest recession (−5.2%) in the history of modern India with inflation rampant at 18.2%. Gandhi proceeded to abrogate the Janata Party government's Five-Year Plan in 1980 and launched the Sixth Five-Year Plan (1980–85). The government targeted an average growth of 5.2% over the period of the plan. Measures to check the inflation were also taken; by the early 1980s inflation was under control at an annual rate of about 5%.

Although Gandhi continued professing socialist beliefs, the Sixth Five-Year Plan was markedly different from the years of Garibi Hatao. Populist programs and policies were replaced by pragmatism. There was an emphasis on tightening public expenditures, greater efficiency of the state-owned enterprises (SOE), which Gandhi qualified as a "sad thing", and in stimulating the private sector through deregulation and liberation of the capital market. The government subsequently launched Operation Forward in 1982, the first cautious attempt at reform. The Sixth Plan went on to become the most successful of the Five-Year Plans yet; showing an average growth of 5.7% over 1980–85.

== Inflation and unemployment ==
The price of oil during the 1970s energy crisis. The graph shows sharp increases in 1973 and again in 1979

During Lal Bahadur Shastri's last full year in office (1965), inflation averaged 7.7%, compared to 5.2% at the end of Gandhi's first stint in office (1977). On average, inflation in India had remained below 7% through the 1950s and 1960s. But, it then accelerated sharply in the 1970s, from 5.5% in 1970–71 to over 20% by 1973–74, due to the international oil crisis. Gandhi declared inflation the gravest of problems in 1974 (at 25.2%) and devised a severe anti-inflation program. The government was successful in bringing down inflation during the emergency; achieving negative figures of −1.1% by the end of 1975–76.

Gandhi inherited a tattered economy in her second term; harvest failures and a second oil shock in the late 1970s had again caused inflation to rise. During Charan Singh's short reign in office in the second half of 1979, inflation averaged 18.2%, compared to 6.5% during Gandhi's last year in office (1984). General economic recovery under Gandhi led to an average inflation at 6.5% from 1981–82 to 1985–86; the lowest since the beginning of India's inflation problems in the 1960s.

Unemployment stayed constant at 9% over a nine-year period (1971–80) before declining to 8.3% in 1983.
