= Dhananjay Ramchandra Gadgil =

Indian economist and institution builder (1901–1971)

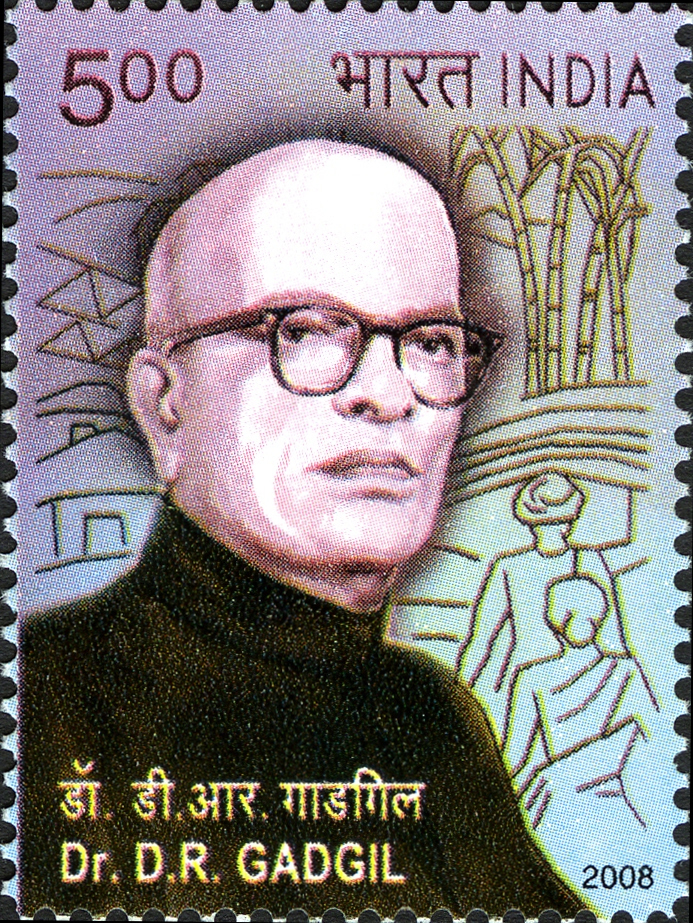
- Born: 10 April 1901; Nasik, Maharashtra, British India
- Died: 3 May 1971 (aged 70); India
- Other name: D. R. Gadgil
- Occupations: Economist institution builder
- Known for: Gadgil formula Indian Cooperative Movement; Gokhale Institute of Politics and Economics
- Spouse: Pramila
- Children: 3 sons and 1 daughter
- Parent: Ramchandra Bhargav

Dhananjay Ramchandra Gadgil (10 April 1901 – 3 May 1971), also known as D. R. Gadgil, was an Indian economist, institution builder and the vice-chairman of the Planning Commission of India. He was the founder Director of the Gokhale Institute of Politics and Economics, Pune and the author of the Gadgil formula, which served as the base for the allocation of central assistance to states during the Fourth and Fifth Five Year Plans of India. He is credited with contributions towards the development of Farmers' Cooperative movement in Maharashtra. The Government of India recognised his services by issuing a commemorative postage stamp in his honour in 2008.

== Biography ==
=== Early years ===
Gadgil was born on 10 April 1901 in Nasik in the western Indian state of Maharashtra as the son of Ramchandra Bhargav, in Brahmin family which had migrated from the Konkan region. His early education was at his ancestral city of Nagpur after which he graduated from Mumbai University and proceeded to Cambridge University from where he secured Master of Arts (MA) and Master of Literature (MLitt) degrees. It is reported that the dissertation he submitted for his MLitt degree became a classic and was published by Oxford University Press as a book, The Industrial Evolution of India in Recent Times in 1924. He stayed at Cambridge and returned to India after obtaining a DLitt (Honoris Causa).

=== Career ===
Once in his home country, Gadgil joined the Maharashtra government service but gave it up in 1925 to serve as the principal at the Maganlal Thakordas Balmukunddas Arts College, Surat. Later, he associated himself with the Servants of India Society of Gopal Krishna Gokhale and when the Gokhale Institute of Politics and Economics (GIPE) was established in Pune in 1930, he became its founder director. His tenure at the institute lasted till 1933 during which time he undertook several projects related to development of rural economy. He was also a member of the Indian Economic Association and served as its president for the year 1940. In 1946, the Government of Maharashtra entrusted him and A. D. Gorwala, an Indian Civil Service officer, with the responsibility of devising a plan for the distribution of food in times of scarcity, and they recommended the introduction of fair price shops and rationing system, reportedly against the suggestions of Mahatma Gandhi. He was also involved with the Samyukta Maharashtra Movement and the cooperative sector and is known to have drawn up a plan for the development of Mumbai and Pune.

Meanwhile, Gadgil's involvement with the cooperative movement in Maharashtra grew as he got associated with the likes of Vithalrao Vikhe Patil, Vaikunthbhai Mehta, Shankarrao Dhumal and others, who were the pioneers of Indian cooperative movement. He became a director of the Pune District Central Cooperative Bank in 1930, served as the chairman of the Maharashtra State Cooperative Bank and held the chair of the National Federation of Cooperative Banks. His association with the cooperative pioneers is said to have resulted in the founding of Pravara Cooperative Sugar Factory, the first industrial venture in the Asian cooperative sector, in 1949. The venture, which later came to be known as the Pravara Model of Integrated Rural Development, is reported to have gained national recognition. He also served as the president of the National Cooperative Union of India, the apex organisation of the cooperative movement in India.

The Reserve Bank of India included him as a member of the Survey Panel for the rural credit and, later, in 1952, he became a director of the apex bank in India, holding the post for a decade, till 1962. In 1966, he took up the post of the vice-chancellor of the Savitribai Phule Pune University but stayed at the post only for one year to move to Union Government as the Deputy chairman of the now defunct Planning Commission of India, the highest bureaucratic position in the Indian economic sector which holds the rank of a cabinet minister. He also served as a nominated member of Rajya Sabha, the upper house of the Indian parliament, from 3 April 1966 to 31 August 1967.

=== Gadgil formula ===
After his appointment as a member of the Planning Commission of India, Gadgil conducted studies on the pattern of allocation of central assistance to the states in the Five-Year Plans of India. In 1969, he evolved a set of guidelines for the purpose, popularly known as the Gadgil formula, which formed the base of central assistance to states in the Fourth and the Fifth Five-Year Plans of India. The proposals were based on the parameters such as Population (60%), Per Capita Income (10%), Tax Effort (10%), On-going Irrigation and Power Projects (10%) and Special Problems (10%). Later, on insistence from the state governments, the formula was revised (modified Gardgil formula) as Population (55%), PCI (25% – calculated by deviation and distance methods), Fiscal Management (5%) and Special Development Problems (15%). In 1990, the standards were again modified, when Pranab Mukherjee, the former President of India, held the post of the deputy chairmanship of the Planning Commission, and the new set of rules came to be known as Gadgil-Mukherjee formula.

=== Personal life and honours ===
Gadgil is known to have been an enthusiastic reader and had a personal library composed of 3000 books. He was married to Pramila and the couple had three sons, Ajit, Purshottam and Madhav, and one daughter, Sulabha. He died on 3 May 1971, succumbing to a heart failure, while he was travelling from New Delhi to Pune. His youngest son, Madhav Gadgil, is a renowned ecologist, who chaired the Western Ghats Ecology Expert Panel (WGEEP) of 2010, popularly known as the Gadgil Commission.

=== Honours ===
A year after Gadgil's death, the Government of Maharashtra and the Ministry of Agriculture jointly started a training institute, Dhananjayrao Gadgil Institute of Co-operative Management (DGICM) at Nagpur, in 1972, to provide training for state government and cooperative sector employees, which is run by the National Council for Cooperative Training (NCCT), New Delhi. On his birth centenary year, Maharashtra Economic Development Council, instituted the Gadgil Centenary Memorial Lecture, which is an annual event. The Government of India honoured him with a commemorative postage stamp, designed by reputed stamp designer, Sankha Samanta, in 2008. Manmohan Singh, then Prime Minister of India, unveiled a statue of Gadgil at Pravara Nagar in Maharashtra on 8 February 2008. The central library of the Gokhale Institute of Politics and Economics has been named Dhananjayrao Gadgil Library, in his honour.

== Publications ==
Gadgil's first published book was his MLitt thesis, The Industrial Evolution of India in Recent Times, originally published by Oxford University Press, in 1924 and subsequently reprinted many times. His researches in the 1930s and 40s, were brought out as a book, The Federal problem in India by Gokhale Institute of Politics and Economics in the Indian Independence year of 1947. The institute published another of his work, Economic Effects of Irrigation: report of a survey of the direct and indirect benefits of the Godavari and Pravara canals, in 1948. His observations on the economic policy of India have been documented as a book, Planning and economic policy in India, first published in 1961, prior to his joining the Planning Commission of India, reprinted subsequently by Sangam Books in 1979. In 2011, Oxford University Press, compiled his works and published India Economy: Problems and Prospects, The: Selected Writings of D.R Gadgil, edited by the noted economist-activist, Sulabha Brahme.

== Bibliography ==
- D. R. Gadgil (2007). The Industrial Evolution of India in Recent Times. first published in 1924: Furnas Press. p. 340. ISBN 978-1406713480.
- D. R. Gadgil (1947). The Federal Problem in India. Gokhale Institute of Politics and Economics. p. 196. ASIN B0007J808S.
- Dhananjaya Ramchandra Gadgil (1948). Economic effects of irrigation: report of a survey of the direct and indirect benefits of the Godavari and Pravara canals. Gokhale Institute of Politics and Economics. p. 183.
- D. R. Gadgil (1979). Planning and economic policy in India. Sangam Books. p. 426. ISBN 978-0861253838.
- Sulabha Brahme, ed. (2011). India Economy: Problems and Prospects, The: Selected Writings of D.R Gadgil. Oxford University Press. p. 503. ISBN 978-0-19-806945-4.
