= Pitambar Pant =

Indian independence activist (died 1973)

- Born: Mumbai, Maharashtra, India
- Died: February 26, 1973
- Occupation: Civil service officer
- Known for: Administrative reforms
- Awards: 1973 Padma Bhushan

Pitambar Pant was an Indian independence activist, civil service officer and writer, best known for his contributions for the establishment of the Central Statistics Office and for changing the Indian system of measurement to the metric system. He served as the secretary to Jawaharlal Nehru, the then prime minister of India and headed the Perspective Planning Division of the Planning Commission of India. He was also the author of a number of books on socialist economics. The Government of India awarded him the Padma Bhushan, the third highest civilian award, in 1973.

== Biography ==
Pitamber Pant completed a master's degree in physics during which time he was involved in the Quit India Movement and imprisoned by the British. This allowed him to get acquainted with Jawaharlal Nehru, J. B. Kripalani and several other independence activists and he worked as a secretary to Nehru, while in jail. After the Indian independence, Nehru, who had been impressed by Pant's preoccupation with economic planning, asked him to meet Prasanta Chandra Mahalanobis, an applied statistician of repute, and the two became friends and long-time associates. Pant accompanied Mahalanobis on the latter's overseas trips. Later, he joined Indian civil service and was entrusted with the task of studying the system of measurement. After a detailed study, he submitted a report, proposing the metric system which was reported to have influenced the government's decision to adopt metric system. Later, he was entrusted with a study on statistical systems; the report Pant prepared along with N. T. Mathew under the title Report on the Present Statistical Organization in Provinces and States in 1949 served as the blueprint for the establishment of the Central Statistical Unit, which, over time, evolved into the present-day Central Statistics Office.

In 1956, Pant joined the Planning Commission of India as a staff member, taking up the position to the secretary of the Chairman, (Nehru, as the prime minister, was the chairman) and headed the Manpower Planning Division of the commission. In this position, he prepared several reports concerning the Indian labor force, utilization of professional manpower, and forecasting of manpower requirement and also headed the Indian Statistical Institute. In 1958, he moved to the newly created Perspective Planning Division as its head and held the position till he retired from official service in 1970. During this period, he served as a member of the Fourth Five Year Plan. After retirement, he was selected as the chairman of the National Committee on Environmental Planning and Coordination (NCEPC) but his tenure was short-lived due to his death on February 26, 1973, succumbing to prolonged illness.

Pant was the author of a number of books, including Memorandum on the introduction of metric system in India, Manpower and educational development in India, 1961–1968 and Urbanization and the long-range strategy of economic development. The Government of India awarded him the Padma Bhushan, the fourth highest civilian honor, in 1973, shortly before his death. The Ministry of Environment and Forests have instituted an annual award, the Pitambar Pant National Environment Fellowship Award, in his honor. The Economic Survey of India (FY 2020–21) has mentioned his advocacy for the idea of "minimum needs".

== Bibliography ==
- Pant, Pitambar (1954). Survey of Faridabad Township, March–April: 1954. New Delhi?: Dept. of Economic Affairs, Ministry of Finance, Govt. of India. OCLC 24191023.
- Pant, Pitambar; Mahalanobis, Prasanta Chandra; Inde; Ministry of finance; Department of economic affairs (1954). The national sample survey. 6, Survey of Faridabad township, March-April 1954. Calcutta: Eka Press. OCLC 492677362.
- Pant, Pitambar; India; Planning Commission (1955). Memorandum on the introduction of metric system in India. Delhi: Planning Commission, Gov't of India. OCLC 3469677.
- Pant, Pitambar (1957). Planning in China: approach, organisationl and method. Place of publication not identified: Planning Commission, Perspective Planning Division. OCLC 22531518.
- Pant, Pitambar; Chaudhuri, T. P; India; Planning Commission; Perspective Planning Division; Indian Statistical Institute (1959). Educated persons in India 1955. India]; Delhi: Scientific & Technical Manpower and Perspective Planning Division, Planning Commission, Government of India; Manager of Publications. OCLC 15143401.
- India; Planning Commission; Perspective Planning Division; Pant, Pitambar (1959). Occupational pattern in manufacturing industries, India, 1956. Delhi. OCLC 12261248.
- Pant, Pitambar (1961). "Manpower Planning and Education". Indian Journal of Public Administration. 7 (3): 320–330. doi:10.1177/0019556119610311. ISSN 0019-5561. S2CID 188233980.
- PANT, Pitambar (1962). Some thoughts on perspective planning. (Lecture given at a conference ... in Istanbul ... in August 1962.). Istanbul. OCLC 503849766.
- Pant, Pitambar (1962). Urbanization and the long-range strategy of economic development. OCLC 83815583.
- Burgess, Tyrrell; Layard, Richard; Pant, Pitambar (1968). Manpower and educational development in India, 1961-1968. Toronto: U.P. OCLC 503187935.

== See also ==
- Ministry of Statistics and Programme Implementation
- NITI Aayog
