= Maharashtra Economic Development Council =

Indian research organization

Coordinates: 18.9250°N 72.8265°E

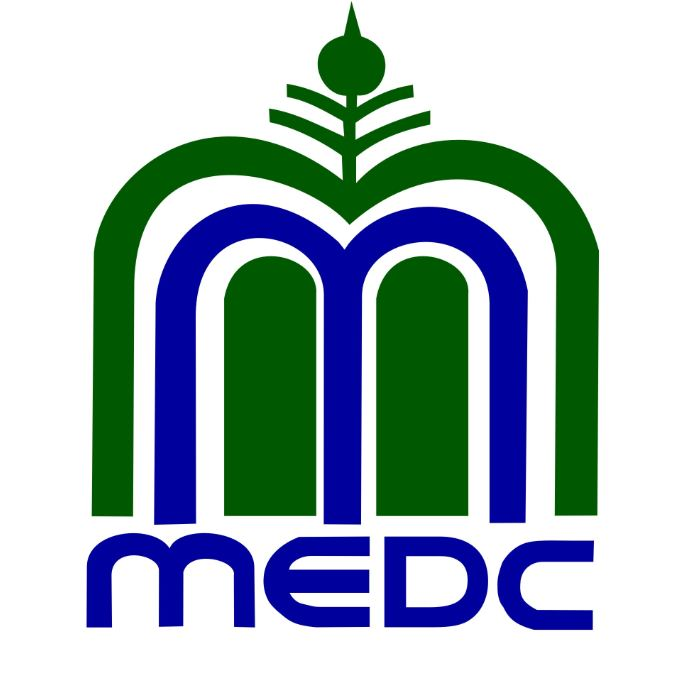
- Type: Trust
- Industry: Think-tank
- Founded: 1957
- Headquarters: Mumbai
- Key people: Ravindra Boratkar (President)

The Maharashtra Economic Development Council (MEDC) is a private research organisation based in Nariman Point, Mumbai. It was established in 1957 with the participation of prominent chambers of commerce, businesses, and industry associations from Maharashtra to "facilitate rapid and balanced economic development of Maharashtra". The Council acts as an economic think-tank for business & industry as also for the Government of Maharashtra. It is an apolitical and autonomous organisation working proactively with the State Government, business and industry, professionals, bankers and economists on issues relating to development of the state.

== History ==
MEDC was founded in 1957 under the stewardship of Dhananjayrao Gadgil, an eminent economist and former Deputy Chairman of the Planning Commission of India. The council was backed by a number of business and industry associations from Maharashtra and was given a mandate to facilitate rapid development of the state through economic research.

The council has been led by multiple presidents in the past, many of whom have been prominent business leaders and economists from the state. Its current president is Ravindra Boratkar, who was elected at the 57th Annual General Meeting of the council in 2018.

== Work ==
MEDC focuses attention exclusively on economic and developmental research for the state of Maharashtra. As a part of its strategy, MEDC has accorded top priority in its agenda to vital issues such as:

- Infrastructure Development
- Balanced Regional Development
- Industry–Education Partnership
- Tourism & Hospitality
- Agriculture and Water Resources
- Economic Growth & Human Development

The organisation also publishes research work and conducts events for industry in the state.

== Publications ==
MEDC has published several research papers till date under contract from the Government of Maharashtra as well as from private businesses looking to improve efficiency and grow.

It also publishes the monthly MEDC Economic Digest, which carries articles from economists, businessmen and policymakers on the particular theme of the issue. Some of the previous issues have had themes such as Urban Infrastructure (Jan 2019), India's Trade Relations (Dec 2018) and The Effects of Demonetisation (Jan 2017). The digest is provided monthly to members of the council and can also be purchased from their website.

Other publications include a series on Secured Governance for various countries, Indian states, and Indian cities by Dr. D.P. Sekhar.

== Events ==
The MEDC also organises various events throughout the year on economic development, industry growth, micro, small & medium enterprises, banking and more. The most important of these events is the annual Dr. D.R. Gadgil Memorial Lecture conducted in Mumbai to commemorate the founder and former president of MEDC. Several luminaries have delivered the lecture in the past, including the likes of Raghuram Rajan, Montek Singh Ahluwalia, Devendra Fadnavis, Kaushik Basu, R.A. Mashelkar, Arthur Carty, Vijay Kelkar, Avinash Dixit, and Yoginder K Alagh.

In 2019, MEDC also hosted Bluecon 2019, a three-day conclave on the blue economy and its prospects in India. Other important events include the Annual MSME Conference, which brings together policymakers, banks and financial institutions, and innovators working in the MSME sector to discuss market needs, financing, challenges and the future of the industry; and the National Conference on Urban Co-operative Banks, which focus on the challenges faced by co-operative banks in the country, banking regulations, technological changes and more.

== Bluecon ==
Bluecon is an annual conclave conducted by MEDC in association with the Federation of Indian Chambers of Commerce. It focuses on creating centre-state partnerships to promote seamless development and to leverage opportunities in the blue economy in India.

Bluecon 2019 was conducted from 26 to 29 February 2019 and saw participation from union ministries, business and industry associations, and industry experts. It included sessions on the Sagarmala programme, adopting trade practices from Norway, shaping the shipping industry, sustainable development of fisheries, mining and exploration opportunities in the Indian Ocean and more.

Bluecon 2020 is planned for 14 and 15 February 2020 in Navi Mumbai.

== See also ==
- Maharashtra
- Government of Maharashtra
- Economy of Maharashtra
- Dhananjayrao Gadgil
