= NCMP =

NCMP may mean:

- National Common Minimum Programme of the UPA, a political coalition ruling India since 2004
- NATO Command Military Police
- Non-constituency Member of Parliament of Singapore
