= Mahatma Phule Museum =

Museum in Pune, India

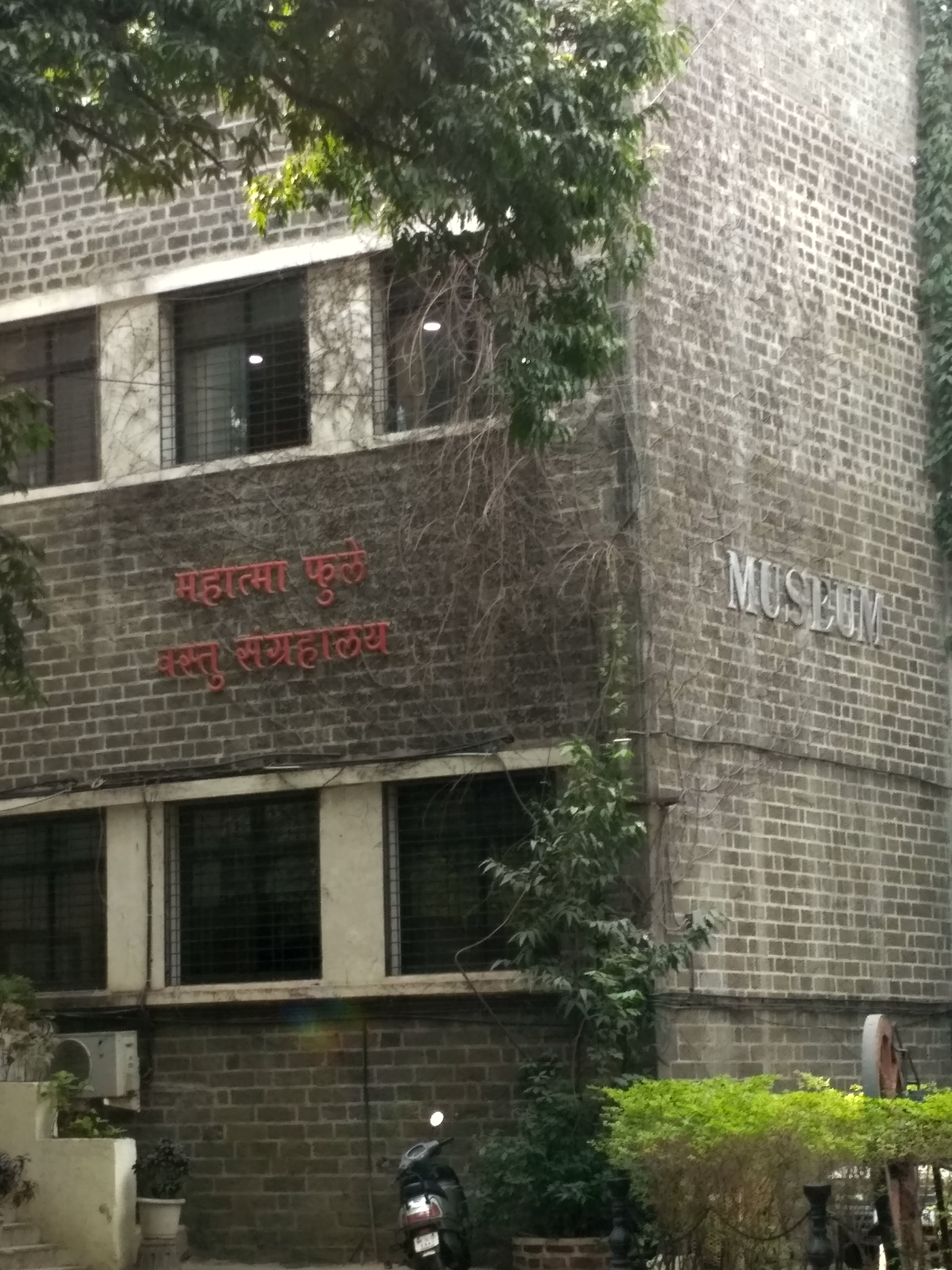
Mahatma Phule Museum

Mahatma Phule Museum is a museum located in Pune, a city in the Indian state of Maharashtra. It was founded in 1890 and was then called the Poona Industrial Museum, and subsequently it was named Lord Reay Museum. In 1968 it was renamed as Mahatma Phule Museum.

== Sections ==
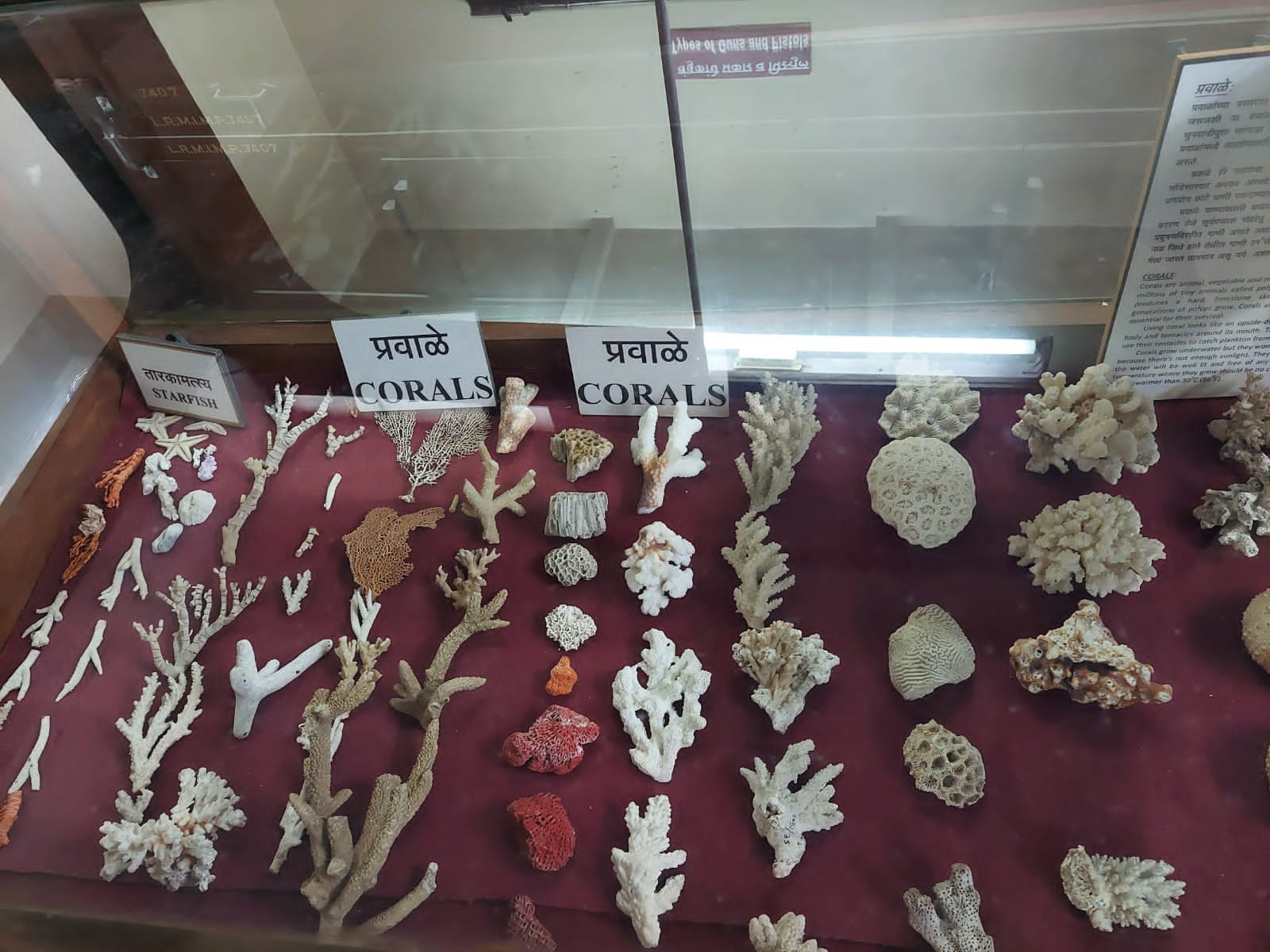
An exhibit in the museum

The museum contains sections that contain some pictures, charts, models and machines and science models. The displays are related to industry and engineering, geology and minerals, handicrafts and cottage industries, agriculture, forestry, natural history and armoury. The armoury has weapons of the Mughal and Maratha period. There are charts that detail various forts in Pune district. The natural history section has a taxidermy collection of various species of animals, birds, insects, snakes and fishes. The industrial section has models of Indian hydro-electric and irrigation projects and oil refining methods that explain scientific agriculture.

== Library ==
The museum has housed a library since its inception. It contains books that cover a variety of subjects, especially those on ancient technologies and museology.

== B. V. Gharpure ==
A TOI news story quotes the present administrator of the museum Rajeev Vilekar thus: "Gharpure was curator at the museum from 1930-1954. His contributions to the museum have been immense... one of the halls here has his name in his honour". A Toledo Blade news story reports the visit to Toledo in March 1948, of B.V. Gharpure, curator of what it calls "Lord Reay Maharashtra Industrial Museum, Bombay". The story quotes Gharpure stating that the purpose of the museum is "teaching an unschooled population in modern methods of agriculture, engineering and science". It reports that the Gharpure was on a year-long international tour that would also take him to Russia and Germany.

== Srishtidnyan ==
The museum publishes the science monthly Srishtidnyan which explains scientific development to lay persons in a simple language. It is the pioneer Marathi popular science monthly, established in 1928. Scientists and experts in different branches of sciences and technology contribute popular articles to the journal.
