= Gokhale Institute of Politics and Economics =

Economic research institute in Pune, India

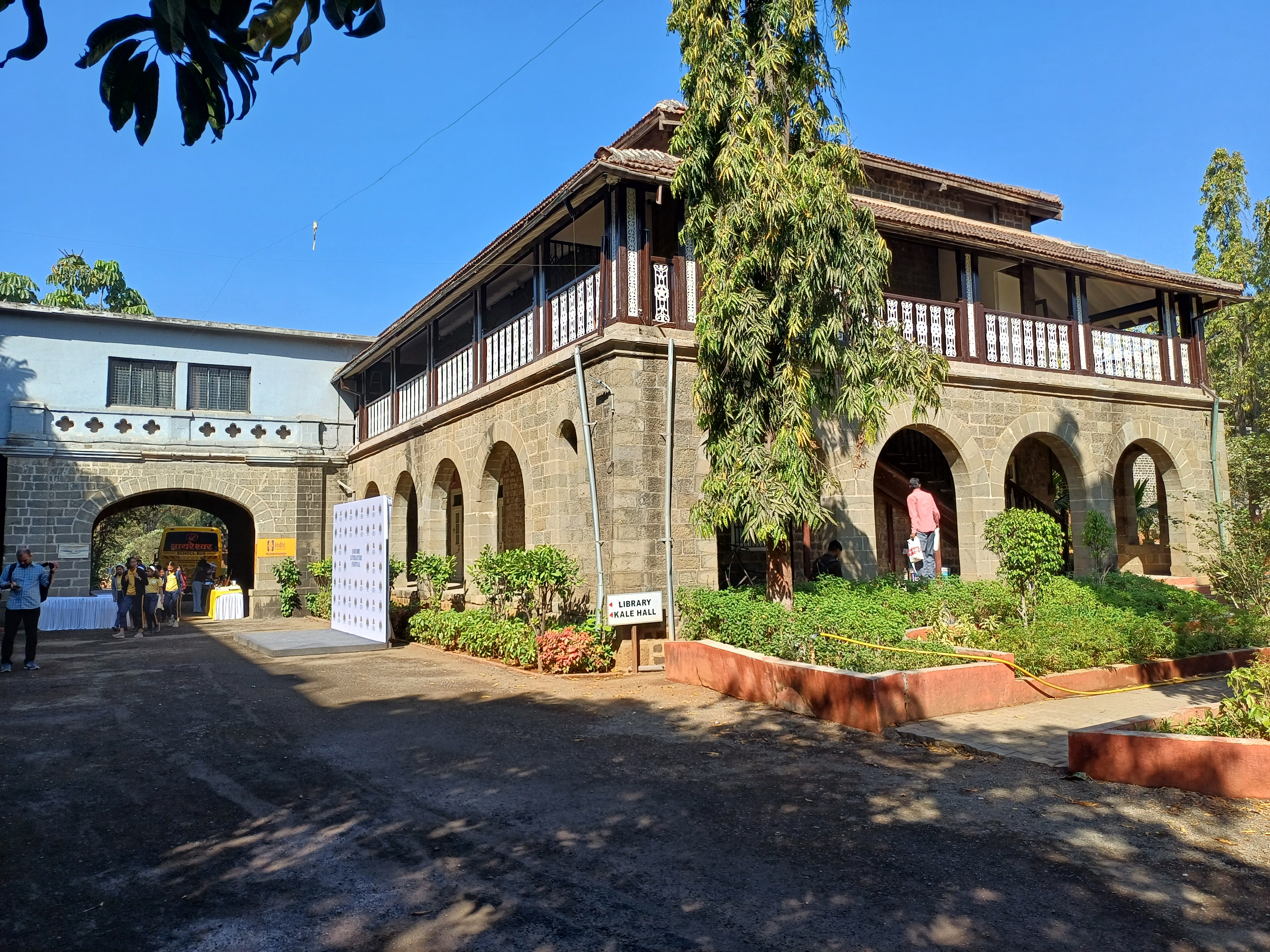
- Motto: Education: An Ennobling Influence
- Type: Deemed University
- Established: June 6, 1930; 96 years ago
- Affiliations: UGC; NAAC
- Chancellor: Sanjeev Sanyal
- Vice-Chancellor: Umakant Dash
- Location: Pune, India; 18.520533265710664°N 73.8376683360123°E
- Website: www.gipe.ac.in

Gokhale Institute of Politics and Economics (GIPE), commonly known as Gokhale Institute, is an Indian economics research and training institute located in Pune. It is one of the oldest institutions of its kind in India.

== History ==
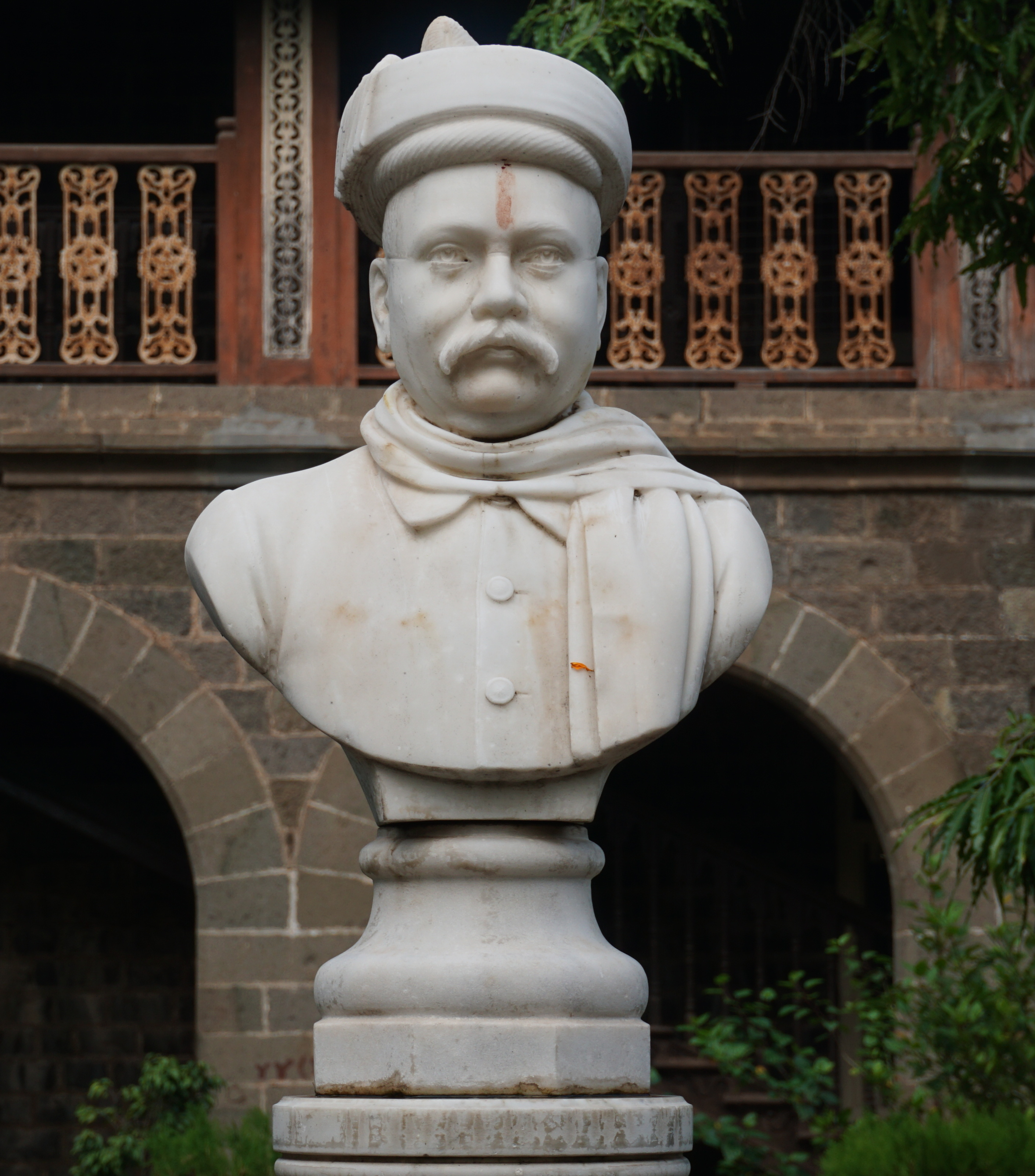
Gopal Krishna Gokhale, founder of GIPE

The institute was founded on 6 June 1930 by R. R. Kale as a centre for research and higher learning in economics. The institute was founded with an endowment offered to the Servants of India Society by Shri R R Kale. The Servants of India Society, a registered body founded by the nationalist leader Gopal Krishna Gokhale, are the trustees of the institute. The institute is registered under the Societies Registration Act, 1860, and the Bombay Public Trusts Act, 1950.

The institute was set up with an objective to conduct research on the economic and political problems of India and to train research workers in these disciplines. D. R. Gadgil was the first director of the institute. It was named a deemed university in 1993.

== Research ==
The major research areas of the institute, developed over the years through financial assistance from various sources, are agricultural economics, population studies, economic history, input–output analysis for planning and development, microeconomics, macroeconomics, monetary economics, financial economics, public economics, international economics and the study of economics of East European countries.

In the early years, the research activities were financed through assistance from various ministries and public funding agencies including the government of Maharashtra and private foundations like the Sir Dorabji Tata Trust. In 1954, the Union Ministry of Food and Agriculture established the Agro-Economic Research Centre of the institute. During the early fifties, the Rockefeller Foundation made a substantial grant, spread over years, for the conduct of a research program in rural demography. The Union Ministry of Health also gave grants for conducting some specific demographic studies in 1954–57; and in 1964, the ministry decided to strengthen and expand the research work on population by financing on a continuing basis a Population Research Centre as an integral part of the institute. Ford Foundation gave a very generous financial assistance for more than a decade beginning with the year 1956. Later on, the Ford Foundation, in co-operation with the Planning Commission, provided a separate grant for research and training in the areas of planning and development, mainly devoted to input–output studies. In 1962, the University Grants Commission (UGC) recognized the institute as a Centre of Advanced Study in Agricultural Economics to start with and later, in 1964, as a Centre of Advanced Study in Economics. In 1977, the UGC, as a part of its Area Studies Program, established at the Institute a Centre of Study of Economics of East European Countries. In the same year, the Reserve Bank of India instituted a chair in finance at the institute.

The Centre for Sustainable Development was established within the Institute on 1 January 2023. The Centre is engaged in research that identifies solutions to real-world challenges in India with an evidence-based approach for equitable, inclusive, and sustainable growth. The Centre is working on several research areas and has ongoing projects like the Mission Sahyadri and human-wildlife conflict.

== Teaching ==
Although GIPE was primarily a research institute, it was recognized as an institution for higher learning in the field of economics, and it awarded MA, MPhil and PhD degrees in Economics under recognition from the University of Mumbai from 1930 to 1949. With the establishment of the University of Pune in 1949, GIPE became a constituent recognized institution of the University of Pune until 1993. Keeping in view its professional standing and scope for further development, the Government of India, on recommendation of the University Grants Commission, declared GIPE as ‘Deemed University’ from 9 May 1993.

== Academic programmes ==
The goal of the institute – to conduct research into the economic and political problems of India and train research workers in these subjects – has been reconceptualized over the years, the institute now focuses solely on teaching and research in economics, excluding India's political problems. However, the applied and empirical research into Indian economic problems and policy evaluations indirectly encompass the political dimensions as well.

The curricular content of the ongoing MSc Economics program offers a blend of core and applied optional courses. The number of subjects per course have been increased from 16 in the MA program to 20 in the ongoing MSc program so as to make the courses more rigorous.

=== Ph.D. program ===
The PhD program, started right from the inception of the institute, still continues with a highly selective intake and hence a limited output. More than 165 students have obtained their doctoral degrees in different branches of economics since the inception of the institute.

=== M.Sc. program ===
GIPE offers two-year M.Sc. program in Economics, Financial Economics, Agri-Business Economics and International Business Economics & Finance. Details of the courses are as follows:

==== M.Sc. (Financial Economics) ====
The master's degree program in Financial Economics is distinct from the conventional finance program, notably on account of its emphasis on the three-way linkage between macroeconomics, financial markets and financial regulations. Inputs in quantitative finance in the form of compulsory courses in Financial Economics, Computational Finance and Financial Engineering are important highlights of the program. In addition, the program provides for full length courses on Project Appraisal & Finance, Structural Products, M&A, and Investment Banking among others.

==== M.Sc. (Agribusiness Economics) ====
The M.Sc. Agribusiness Economics program prepares students for careers in the agribusiness sector, both as officers in agribusiness organizations, and as economists in agribusiness related research organizations. The academic content of the program has three major modules: an economics module, a management module, and an agribusiness module.

==== M.Sc. (International Business Economics & Finance) ====
This new program to be offered from the academic year 2016-17 is a unique course designed for careers in international trade, foreign portfolio investment, foreign direct investment, international technical/financial collaboration and joint ventures, international finance and portfolio management, etc.

==== M.Sc. (Population Studies and Health Economics) ====
This program is expected to shape scholars interested in population, public health and health economics.

M.A. (Economics)

This program is designed for careers in different public services and to give advanced level knowledge in microeconomics and macroeconomics Additionally this program includes courses pertaining public economics, monetary microeconomics, basic econometrics, international relations, Indian polity, environmental and resource economics. This program offers edge to students in economics services.

M.Sc. Economics (Public Policy)

The institute also offers a Certificate Course on Computer Applications in Economic Analysis.

=== B.Sc. program ===
The institute offers a four-year undergraduate degree in Economics, encompassing forty-two courses. In addition to being a quantitative introduction to the discipline, the program covers finance, management, accounting and sociology. It introduced its first batch in 2019.

Admissions to the B.Sc. courses are primarily through CUET scores in English and General Ability.

== Publications ==
The institute publishes a quarterly journal of economics in English, Artha Vijnana, the first publication of which was made in March 1959. This journal publishes results of research work carried out in the Institute as well as works of scholars from outside the institute after a refereeing process. The institute also publishes research works in the form of books and mimeograph series. The Kale Memorial Lecture, organized by the institute every year on the occasion of the Founder's Day, is published under the Kale Memorial Lecture Series. Over 70 lectures have been delivered under this Lecture Series, and the list of speakers includes such prominent figures as: B R Ambedkar, John Mathai, P C Mahalanobis, V.K.R.V. Rao, K N Raj, V M Dandekar, I G Patel, Andre Beteille, Manmohan Singh, Amresh Bagchi, Jagdish Bhagwati, C Rangarajan and A P J Abdul Kalam. All the Kale Memorial Lectures delivered at the Gokhale Institute are published, and most of the Lectures' Text can be found on JSTOR.

This is a List of Kale Memorial Lectures held at Gokhale Institute of Politics and Economics since 1937.

Year	Speaker	Title
1937	V. G. Kale	Modern Tendencies in Economic Thought and Policy
1938	G. S. Ghurye	The Social Process
1939	B. R. Ambedkar	Federation Versus Freedom
1940	K. T. Shah	The Constituent Assembly
1941	A. V. Thakkar	The Problem of the Aborigines in India
1942	V. L. Mehta	A Plea for Planning in Cooperation
1943	S. G. Vaze	The Formation of Federations
1944	John Mathai	Economic Policy
1945	S. R. Deshpande	A Statistical Approach to Vital Economic Problems
1946	J. V. Joshi	India's Sterling Balances
1948	C. D. Deshmukh	Central Banking in India : A Retrospect
1949	Dattatreya Gopal Karve	Public Administration in Democracy
1950	R. L. Dey	Policy of Protection in India
1951	M. Venkatrangaiya	Competitive and Cooperative Trends in Federalism
1952	A. D. Gorwala	The Role of the Administrator: Past, Present and Future
1953	Laxmanshastri Joshi	Indian Nationalism
1954	W. R. Natu	Public Administration and Economic Development
1955	P. C. Mahalanobis	Some Thoughts on Planning in India
1956	S. K. Muranjan	Reflections on Economic Growth and Progress
1957	B. K. Madan	Financing the Second Five-Year Plan
1958	V. K. R. V. Rao	Some Reflections on the Rate of Saving in Developing Economy
1959	K. P. Chattopadhayay	Some Approaches to Study of Social Change
1960	B. Venkatappiah	The Role of Reserve Bank of India in the Development of Credit Institutions
1961	B. N. Ganguli	Economic Integration : Regional, National and International
1962	A. Appadorai	Dilemma in Modern Foreign Policy
1963	H. M. Patel	The Defence of India
1964	M. L. Dantwala	Agriculture in a Developing Economy: The Indian Experience (The Impact of Economic Development on the Agricultural Sector)
1965	Pitambar Pant	Decades of Transition – Opportunities and Tasks
1966	D. R. Gadgil	District Development Planning
1967	S. L. Kirloskar	Universities and the Training of Industrial and Business Management
1968	E. M. S. Namboodripad	The Republican Constitution in the Struggle for Socialism
1969	J. J. Anjaria	Strategy of Economic Development
1971	Rajani Kothari	Political Economy of Development
1972	V. V. John	Education as Investment
1973	K. N. Raj	The Politics and Economics of "Intermediate Regimes"
1974	H. K. Paranjape	India's Strategy for Industrial Growth: An Appraisal
1975	Ashok Mitra	Growth and Diseconomies
1976	S. V. Kogekar	Revision of the Constitution
1977	M. N. Srinivas	Science, Technology and Rural Development in India
1978	J. P. Naik	Educational Reform in India : A Historical Review
1979	Tarlok Singh	The Planning Process and Public Policy : A Reassessment
1980	Aloo J. Dastur	Problems of Indian Minorities
1981	V. M. Dandekar	Measurement of Poverty
1982	I. S. Gulati	IMF Conditionality and Low Income Countries
1983	I. G. Patel	Inflation - Should it be Cured or Endured?
1984	M. P. Rege	Concepts of Justice and Equality in the Indian Tradition
1985	Andre Beteille	Equality of Opportunity and the Equal Distribution of Benefits
1986	Manmohan Singh	The Quest for Equity in Development
1987	K. R. Ranadive	Town and Country in Economy in Transition
1988	Sukhamoy Chakravarti	Development of Development Thinking
1989	Malcolm S. Adiseshiah	Eighth Plan Perspectives
1990	D. T. Lakdawala	Indian Public Debt
1991	Bagicha Singh Minhas	Public Versus Private Sector: Neglect of Lessons of Economics in Indian Policy Formulation
1992	Verghese Kurien	Agricultural and Rural Development in the 1990s and Beyond: What should India Do and Why?
1993	Raja J. Chelliah	An Essay on Fiscal Deficit
1994	G. Ram Reddy	The Financing of Higher Education in India
1995	Madhav Gadgil	Patenting Life
1996	A. M. Ahmadi	Constitutional Values and the Indian Ethos
1997	Vasant Gowarikar	Something Happening in India that this Nation Should be Proud of
1998	S. Venkitaramanan	Dilemmas of Development: The Indian Experience
1999	Mihir Rakshit	Post-Uruguay Round Trade Negotiations: A Developing Country Perspective
2000	A. Vaidyanathan	Poverty and Development Policy
2001	Amaresh Bagchi	Fifty Years of Fiscal Federalism in India : An Appraisal
2002	Jagdish Bhagwati	The Globalisation Debate and India's Economic Reforms
2003	C. Rangarajan	Challenges for Monetary Policy
2004	A. P. J. Abdul Kalam	The evolution of enlightened citizen centric Society (Politics without nobility is similar to a balloon without air )
2005	Utsa Patnaik	Poverty and Neo –Liberalism
2006	Kirit S. Parikh	Bridging Divides and Reducing Disparities
2007	Partha Chatterjee	Democracy and Economic Transformation in India
2008	Prabhat Patnaik	Speculation and Growth in Contemporary Capitalism
2009	C. B. Bhave	Evolution of the Capital Markets And Regulations in INDIA
2010	Subir Gokarn	Food Inflation: This time it's Different
2012	R.A. Mashelkar	Innovation Economy: The Challenge and Opportunities
2014	Erik Dietzenbacher	World Input-Output Database: An Application to India
2015	Raghuram Rajan	Global Economic Changes and their implications on Emerging Market Economies (EMEs), especially India
2016	Heinz D. Kurz	SECULAR STAGNATION - Observations on a Recurrent Spectre
2017	N. R. Narayana Murthy	Role of Culture in Economic Growth and in Elimination of Poverty in India
2019	Y. V. Reddy	Central Banking: Retrospect and Prospects
2020	Eric Maskin	Introduction to Mechanism Design
2021	Abhijit Banerjee	What do We Know about Poverty Traps

== Campus ==
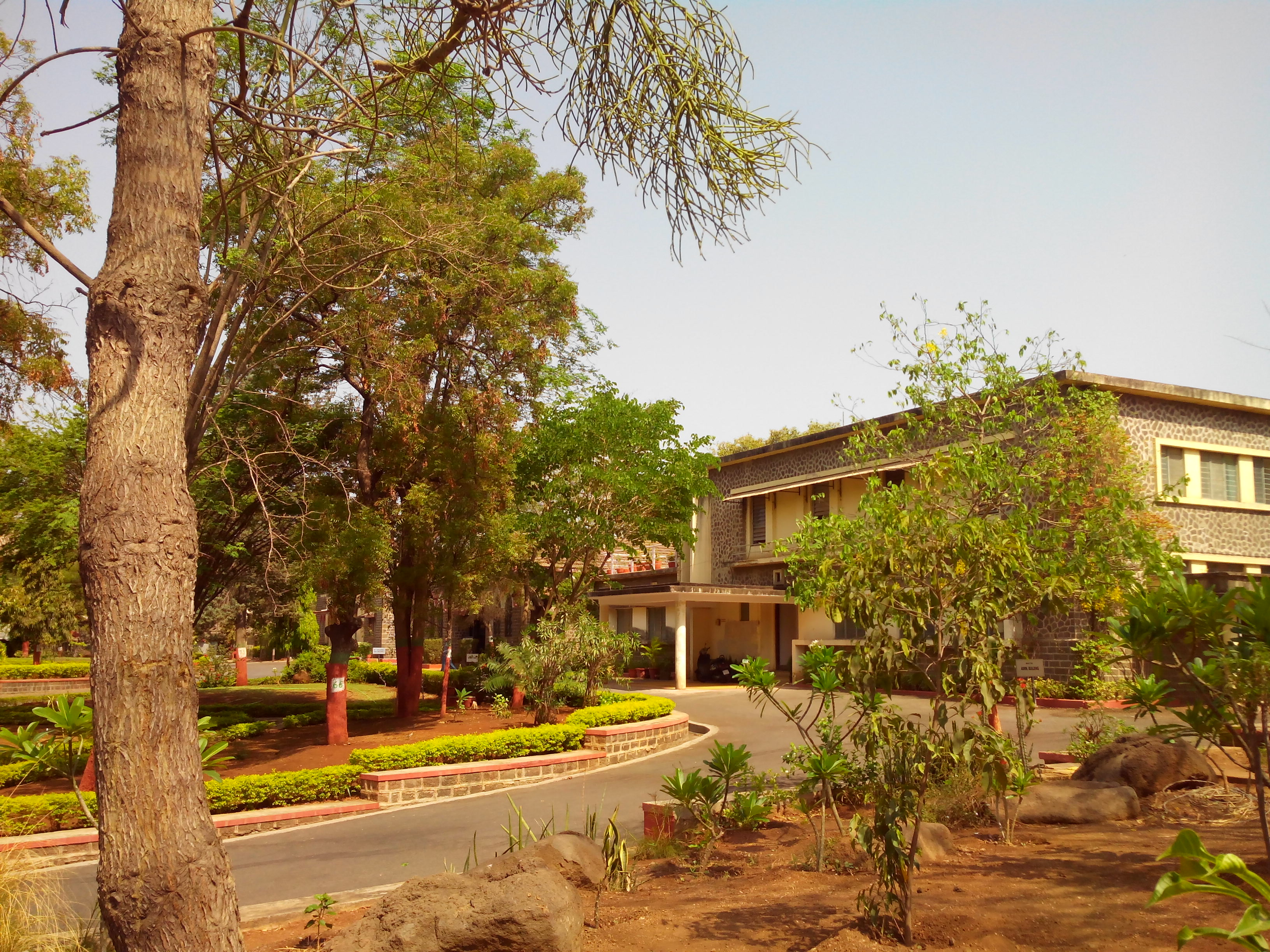

The institute has a campus of 5.25 acres (21,200 m^{2}), located in the urban setting of Pune, in the Deccan Gymkhana area. The residential campus of the institute comprising faculty and staff houses, guest houses, and the student dormitories, is built on a separate plot of 5.39 acres (21,800 m^{2}), a few metres away from the institute. There are two hostels, one for boys and another for girls. Adequate hostel accommodation is available for the existing students. The girls’ hostel was designed by the famous architect and urban planner Christopher Charles Benninger during 1996–1998.

The institute campus is a mélange of old and new buildings. The campus consists of an academic block, faculty block, administration block, seminar hall and the Dhananjay Rao Gadgil Library. There is a conference hall, known as Kale Memorial Hall, on the top floor of the library which is used by the institute and also let out to others on rent. On the Fergusson Hill behind the institute lies the spot where Gokhale took the vows of the Servants of India Society – poverty, obedience, and service to nation – and administered them to three others. It has become a landmark because of the erection of a column there. Gokhale's bungalow still stands in the precincts of the campus. A massive and graceful banyan tree adds to the charm of the place. This is said to be the tree under which Gopal Krishna Gokhale and Mahatma Gandhi (who regarded Gokhale as his political guru) used to muse over political issues in their times.

== Library ==
The Dhananjay Rao Gadgil Library is a depository library of the publications of the United Nations and its agencies, the World Bank, the European Economic Community, the International Monetary Fund, and the government of Canada. The library possesses quite a large number of rare books published before the advent of twentieth century and which may not be available elsewhere. The oldest book in the library dates back to 1680. Besides, there are quite a few hundred books which were published during the 18th and 19th centuries.
