= This Fissured Land =

1992 book by Madhav Gadgil and Ramachandra Guha

This Fissured Land: An Ecological History of India
- Second edition
- Author: Madhav Gadgil and Ramachandra Guha
- Language: English
- Subject: Ecology, History
- Publisher: Oxford University Press, as Oxford India Paperbacks and Oxford India Perennials
- Publication date: 1992, 1993, 2013
- Publication place: India
- Media type: Print (Paperback)
- Pages: 216 (excluding Index, Bibliography etc.)
- ISBN: 978-0-19-807744-2

This Fissured Land: An Ecological History of India is a book by Madhav Gadgil and Ramachandra Guha on the ecological history of India. It examines 'prudent' (sustainable) and 'profligate' (unsustainable) use of natural resources, and their effects. It describes the ecological history of India, from the first humans, through the ages of hunter-gatherers, farmers, empires and the British Raj.

== Outline ==
The book is split into three parts, as follows:

Part 1 introduces the concept of "Modes of resource use". According to Sonja Brodt of the University of Hawaii, the authors based this classification on the "Marxist 'mode of production' framework, which they intend to complement ...[as it lacks]... reflection on ecological parameters, and ...[so]... is not adequately materialistic ... [This book is therefore] written from a strongly materialistic perspective. Everything from economy to ideology is seen to derive from resource use modes." Accordingly, there are four modes of resource use - gathering / shifting cultivation, nomadic pastoralism, settled cultivation and industrial society (whether socialist or capitalist), even though more than one mode of resource use may exist in one society at a time. The modes are distinguished by technology, economy, social organisation. ideology and ecological impact. There is conflict between modes, and also within a mode.

This section also explains the difference between prudent or sustainable use of resources and unsustainable or profligate resource exploitation. Sustainable use involves restrictions on the use of (1) ecologically important species, (2) ecologically sensitive areas, (3) certain life stages (e.g. juveniles) etc. Such strategies may be based on either trial and error - as in early humans and modern tribal societies - or observation and study - as in most modern societies. In either case, sustainable use has little negative impact on the environment, and societies can survive for long periods of time without significant changes. Unsustainable use, whether scientific or unscientific, leads to rapid exhaustion of resources and damage to both the society and its environment.

Part 2 discusses ecological events in the history of India. It argues that the replacement of early hunter-gatherer societies with extensive agricultural ones lead to an environmental crisis during the fourth century CE. Gradually, a village-level conservation system developed. The growing environmental awareness is visible in Buddhist and Jain teachings and literature. Some of these teachings - non-violence, vegetarianism and a practice of mixed agriculture with domestication of animals - particularly cattle - are still seen in India.

Part 3 examines ecologically important events during, and just after, British rule. Colonial forestry practices, such as those favoured by Baden-Powell, led to the destruction of village - level conservation systems. At the same time, little was done on Dietrich Brandis's recommendations to introduce a centralised conservation strategy (as Germany had). The book argues that this is a major reason for India's ecological problems. Finally, a study of industrial and state forestry is made, concluding that they are far inferior to village or social forestry when it comes to conservation.

Sonja Brodt feels that "...[the authors avoid]... the usual, overused stories of conflict ... They also avoid some of the black-and-white cliches so common in writings about colonial resource exploitation in the third world. For example, although British forestry policies are pinpointed as one major cause of forest depletion and conflicts, the authors ...[provide written evidence]... that some of the administrators openly opposed the prevailing policies. They also decline to exonerate all Indian rulers ... The result is an analysis that for the most part is refreshingly frank and balanced in its assessments."

The concluding chapter says that it is too early to say whether a new, more sustainable, mode of resource use will develop as a result of the present environmental crisis. This is because "given the complexity of ecological communities, precise prescriptions for the prudent use of living resources are difficult". Sonja Brodt agrees that "it is ultimately contingent upon the reader to delve deeply into the historical analysis for any lessons it might hold".

== Publication ==
The original 1992 release was followed by an Oxford India Paperback version in 1993. A revised edition was published in 2013, as part of the 'Oxford India Perennials' series.

== Reception ==
E. P. Thompson noted that the book stuck to the pessimistic tone of most environmental texts, and asked why this should be so for a book that looks at a land of such natural and cultural diversity.
