= Sulochana Gadgil =

Indian meteorologist (1944–2025)

- Born: 1944; Poona, Bombay Province, British India
- Died: 24 July 2025 (aged 81)
- Education: Pune University (BSc, MSc); Harvard University (PhD)
- Spouse: Madhav Gadgil
- Scientific career
- Fields: Oceanography, meteorology

Sulochana Gadgil (1944 – 24 July 2025) was an Indian meteorologist who retired as Professor from the Centre for Atmospheric and Oceanic Sciences (CAOS) in Bangalore, India. She studied the how and why of monsoons, including farming strategies to cope with rainfall variability and modelling ecological and evolutionary phenomena. Her research led to the discovery of a basic feature of the sub-seasonal variation in the monsoon cloud bands.

She demonstrated that the monsoon is not a gigantic land-sea breeze but instead is a manifestation of the seasonal migration of a planetary-scale system which is seen over non-monsoonal regions as well. In collaboration with the farmers she derived farming strategies which are tailored to the rainfall variability of different regions in India.

== Early life and education ==
She obtained her BSc (1963) and MSc (1965) in Mathematics from the University of Pune and a PhD (1970) in Applied Mathematics from Harvard. She had also been a post-doctoral Fellow at the Massachusetts Institute of Technology (1970–71).

== Return to India ==
In 1971, Gadgil returned to India with her husband, Madhav Gadgil, who was also a Harvard scholar. She worked in the Indian Institute of Tropical Meteorology Pune as a CSIR pool officer for two years. She worked with scientists like R. Ananthakrishnan and D.R. Sikka during this period and was recruited to the Centre for Theoretical Studies (CTS) as a member. Out of this, a new institution, the Centre for Atmospheric and Oceanic Sciences (CAOS), was born.

== Awards and honours ==
Gadgil is a recipient of Vikram Sarabhai Award, Norman Borlaug Award and Astronautical Society Award. She was conferred on the Life Time Achievement Award by the Ministry of Earth Sciences (2008). She is a Fellow of Indian Academy of Sciences Bangalore and Indian Meteorological Society.

== Personal life and death ==
Gadgil was married to Madhav Gadgil, an ecologist, and they had a daughter and a son.

Gadgil died on 24 July 2025.

== See also ==
- Madhav Gadgil
- Pune University
