= Elaeocarpus gadgilii =

Scientific classification
- Kingdom: Plantae
- Clade: Embryophytes
- Clade: Tracheophytes
- Clade: Angiosperms
- Clade: Eudicots
- Clade: Rosids
- Order: Oxalidales
- Family: Elaeocarpaceae
- Genus: Elaeocarpus
- Species: E. gadgilii

Binomial name
- Elaeocarpus gadgilii A.M.Maya, V.Suresh & K.M.P.Kumar

Species of flowering plant

Elaeocarpus gadgilii is a species of tree in the genus Elaeocarpus found in the southern Western Ghats. It was described in 2021 and named after the Indian ecologist Madhav Gadgil.
