= A. D. Gorwala =

Indian diplomat

Astad Dinshaw (A.D.) Gorwala CIE, ICS (1900–1989) was an officer of the Indian Civil Service, and then publisher of Opinion, a newsletter through which he doggedly opposed the Indian Emergency, which lasted from 25 June 1975 to 21 March 1977.

A Parsi born in 1900, Gorwala entered the Indian Civil Service in 1924, sitting the exams in India. He was posted to several places during his service, including Sindh. As a Secretary to the Government of Bombay and its Director of Civil Supplies and Supply Commissioner, he was appointed a Companion of the Order of the Indian Empire (CIE) in the 1944 imperial New Year Honours list.

== Biography ==
Gorwala focused his writing on attacks on the individual by the agencies of the state. He also fought a long battle against corruption. A year into the Indian Emergency, Opinion was ordered shut down, but Gorwala was able to print one last issue, in which he observed that,

The current Indira regime, founded on June 26, 1975, was born through lies, nurtured through lies, and flourished by lies. The essential ingredient of its being is the lie. Consequently, to have a truth-loving, straight thinking journal to examine it week after week and point out its falsehoods becomes intolerable to it.

Gorwala was also critical of Jawaharlal Nehru's apparent naiveté in matters relating to the Soviet Union. Just before Nehru (at that time the Prime Minister of India) left for Moscow in 1955 (his first visit to the Soviet Union since independence), Gorwala wrote,

... like many another sensitive nature, accustomed in its late twenties and early thirties to regard the soviet union as truly progressive, the Prime Minister seems never to have quite gotten over the vision of those days. Despite all that has happened since then, the Soviet Union still retains dor him some of that enchantment. To its virtues he continues to be very kind, to its vices and cruelties, he is almost blind.

Gorwala also established Bombay's food rationing system during World War II, a system that still operates, though with reduced efficiency.
