= Minimum Needs Programme (India) =

Indian economic programme

The Minimum Needs Programme (MNP) was introduced in the first year of the Fifth Five Year Plan(1974–78), to provide certain basic minimum needs and improve the living standards of people. It aims at "social and economic development of the community, particularly the underprivileged and underserved population". It also promoted equality as from now poor will be able to get basic needs.

== Components ==
The programme includes the following components:

- Rural health
- Rural water supply
- Rural electrification
- Elementary education
- Adult education
- Nutrition
- Environmental improvement of urban slums
- Houses for landless labourers

== Principles ==
Two basic principles are observed during the implementation of Minimum Needs Programme:

- the facilities under MNP are to be first provided in those areas which are at present underserved so as to remove disparities among different areas
- the facilities under MNP should be provided as a package to an area through intersectorial area projects to have a greater impact.it will provide good care to the poor people

== Objectives ==
=== Rural health ===
The objectives to be achieved by the end of the Eighth Five Year Plan are:

- One peripheral health centre for 30,000 population in plains and 20,000 population in tribal and hilly areas
- one sub-centre for a population of 5000 people in the plains and for 3000 in tribal and hilly areas
- one community health centre for a population of 100,000

The establishment of peripheral health centres, their up gradation also come under MNP.

=== Nutrition ===
- to extend support of nutrition to 11 million eligible persons
- to expand special nutrition programme to all ICDS projects
- to consolidate mid-day meal program and link it to health, potable water and sanitation.
