= Common minimum programme =

Shared agenda of a coalition government

The common minimum programme (CMP) is a document outlining the shared agenda, policy, and priorities of a coalition government in India and Nepal. It provides a framework for government operations, ensuring that all participating parties share a common understanding of the key issues and goals they aim to collectively address.

The idea of CMP document has acquired prominence since coalition governments have become the norm in India in 1990s.

== History ==
The United Front, a coalition government established in 1996, emphasized secularism, economic reforms, social justice, and empowerment of marginalized groups through its Common Minimum Programme. In 1998, the National Democratic Alliance (NDA), spearheaded by the Bharatiya Janata Party (BJP), assumed power. Its Common Minimum Programme prioritized national security, economic growth, infrastructure development, and effective governance. Additionally, it aimed to foster social cohesion, reinforce federalism, and tackle issues pertaining to agriculture and rural progress. The Indian National Congress-led United Progressive Alliance (UPA) coalition which won the 2004 Indian general election, had objectives such as education spending, limiting privatization, economic growth, social welfare, and "maintaining a credible nuclear weapons programme".

Besides India, Nepal also releases common minimum programme documents. It first happened in 2004 when the Nepali Congress (Democratic) formed a coalition.

== See also ==
- Five-Year plans of India
