= Garibi Hatao =

1971 Indian electoral campaign slogan

Garibi Hatao Desh Bachao (Hindi: गरीबी हटाओ देश बचाओ, lit. 'Remove poverty, save the country') was the theme and slogan of Indira Gandhi's 1971 election campaign. The slogan and the proposed anti-poverty programs that came with it were designed to give Gandhi an independent national support, based on rural and urban poor, which would allow her to by-pass the dominant rural castes both in and out of state and local government; likewise the urban commercial class. And, for their part, the previously voiceless poor (particularly Dalits and Adivasis) would at last gain both political worth and political weight.

The programs created through garibi hatao, though carried out locally, were funded, developed, supervised, and staffed by Government officials in New Delhi and Congress Party officials. It was part of the 5th Five-Year Plan.
