= Gadgil formula =

Formula assessing central state planning

The Gadgil formula is named after Dhananjay Ramchandra Gadgil, a social scientist and the first critic of Indian planning. It was evolved in 1969 for determining the allocation of central assistance for state plans in India. Gadgil formula was adopted for distribution of plan assistance during Fourth and Fifth Five-Year Plans.

== Gadgil Formula ==
The Gadgil formula was formulated with the formulation of the third Five-Year Plan for the distribution of plan transfers amongst the states. It was named after D. R. Gadgil, then deputy chairman of the Planning Commission. The central assistance provided for in the first three plans and annual plans of 1966–1969 lacked objectivity in its formulation and did not lead to equal and balanced growth in the states. The National Development Council (NDC) approved the following formula:

1. Special Category states like Assam, Jammu and Kashmir and Nagaland were given preference. Their needs should be met first, out of the total pool of Central assistance.

2. The remaining balance of the Central assistance should be distributed among the remaining states on the basis of the following criteria:

- 60 per cent on the basis of population;
- 7.5 per cent on the basis of tax effort, determined on the basis of individual State's per capita tax receipts as a percentage of the State's per capita income;
- 25 per cent on the basis of per capita state income, assistance going only to States whose per capita incomes are below the national average;
- 7.5 per cent for special problems of individual states.

The reasoning behind the given weights:

i. Population

In a country like India, population acts as an apt measure to represent the requirements of the people because a major portion of the population lives below the poverty line. This proposition was also supported by the empirical data which showed a negative correlation between population of states and their per capita income.

ii. Tax effort

This is an important factor to measure the potential of the state as far as its own resources are concerned. This relative measure incentivizes the states to undertake measures to increase their own potential through various tax measures.

iii. State per capita income

A problem regarding unequal development amongst the states was faced in the earlier plans because of larger states with their large plans were able to get a larger share of resources from the centre. This led to increased inequalities amongst the states. Therefore, to make the distribution fairer to the smaller states with a lesser than national per capita average income were given extra share in the resources.

iv. Special problems

This factor was introduced so as to provide enough resources to states to overcome problems like droughts, famines etc. In the absence of this share, such states would have suffered huge losses because of these problems and the implementation of their plans could have been hindered. This was a discretionary element in the formula which required proper scrutiny of the states situation by the Finance Commission.

v. Irrigation and power projects

These projects have been in the process of implementation before the fourth plan was formulated. They needed extra resources for the successful completion of these projects.

== Background ==
The offer of financial assistance from the centre to the states for implementing planned development has been an extremely important matter right from the beginning of the Indian Planning process. The constitution divides the responsibilities between the Union government and the state governments. There was an imbalance between responsibilities assigned to the states and the revenue resources possessed by them to carry out those responsibilities. The transfer of resources for development purposes under the Plans came to be made under Article 282 of the Constitution. The states were highly dependent on the Union government for financing their development plans because the extra resources on which states could bank on were largely concentrated with the Union government.

There was a need for a separate body to look into the division of resources. Therefore, the finance commission was appointed in 1951 for the allocation of resources of revenue between the central and the state governments. It was held responsible for examining their liabilities, the resources of the states, their budgeted promises and the effort undertaken to fulfil their commitment. Each five year, the finance commission puts in its recommendations on the proportion of the total collections to be allocated to each of the states. The Planning Commission which was formed soon after the framing of the constitution of India looked into the problems of financing development, which had added to the old problem of financial relations. It came into being because the issue of formulating development plans and implement them efficiently for the development of the economy was not only a very important but also a necessary one. This commission provides for a settlement between the centre and the states in two categories:

1. Division of revenues
2. Grants in special cases

The centre adds to state resources by conferring fixed percentage of revenue from taxation and from other sources to the states. However, this does not ensure a proper balance in distribution. There are states which are poorer or more backward than the others and therefore require central finances on a much larger scale than the others. This is why recommendations for special grants were introduced. Hence in this manner, the extra resources controlled by the centre were shared with the states to finance the state plans. However, this system in turn induced the states to undertake those schemes in which they got a higher share of the central finances and therefore a steady central assistance was given to the states for a planned period. The grants were supposed to be given to the states which did not have enough capital assets that would have earned them enough money to pay for loans taken from the centre. They were provided to the states outright according to their needs. But in reality, no correlation was found between grants and the need for them.

The first Five Year Plan had provision of only a marginal central assistance which did not play an important part. Due to this, in the second five-year plan, substantial importance was given to it. And in the third five-year plan, the states had laid more stress on planning and had become critical. In fact, they were given a choice set of various schemes with various proportions of grants and loans attached. This led to an obvious result. The states with larger resources and power could choose schemes with a greater share of grants in them. On the other hand, poor states had to finance almost all their plans by the loans given by the central government. Consequently, there were huge variations in the averages of grants and loans received by the states. A developed state which had resources got 40% as grants; an under-developed state which had no resources got 12% as grants while the average was 22% . The commissions did not have a distinct criteria which was used while allocation of resources. As a result, the states were dissatisfied when they realised that the larger states were getting a bigger share in the pie.

Therefore, in 1965 when the fourth plan was being thought of, the states demanded for a set of firm objective criteria for the distribution of central assistance. The planning commission left it on the states to decide on the criteria. But no agreement was reached in the National Development Council (NDC). Thus, the planning commission thought of an award system, where the finance commission had the discretion to award states in times of need after a proper scrutiny of their situation. In 1968, Planning Commission induced the state governments to come to an agreement. The system of varying proportions of grants and loans from scheme to scheme was abolished. Central assistance to states was now given uniformly in blocks. Each state got 70% loans and 30% grants. There was no special manoeuvrability and therefore no special advantage on the part of the bigger states. This type of settlement also faced problems because of the artificial division between the plan and the non-plan expenditures. The former type of expenditure was to be looked after by the finance commission awards and the latter by central assistance given by either NDC or the Planning Commission. The loan part which was given to the state had gotten accumulated and for some of the states the loan obligation and repayments were bigger than the assistance they got. In 1969, after the draft the fourth five-year plan was presented, the Planning Commission officially discussed with the states the impact of the Finance Commission Awards on their finances. Great variations in the provision of these awards were witnessed amongst the states. Some states had a substantial surplus and other states could not even meet their budgetary responsibilities.

Another problem was of the ways and means advances. To overcome the temporary difficulties faced by the state governments, the Reserve Bank of India provided this facility so that the states could balance their balance sheet and remain solvent. This was the extra debt that was to be cleared quickly. After the droughts and famines hit India, states had huge overdrafts year after year. Therefore, it was recommended by the Planning commission that resources must first be set aside for meeting the deficits of the states and then help in enabling states to put the new resources into their plans. This was an effort towards bringing non plan and plan expenditures together. This has partially helped in solving the problem of artificial division of expenditures into plan and non-plan expenditures.

The other problem was that the total division of resources did not lead to equality in the development in the states. The larger states with their own resources could have a larger plan and the states with less of own resources at their disposal could only have smaller plans. This led to unequal patterns of development in the country. This problem was partly solved by providing 10% of the total resources to states with lesser per capita income than the national average in the formula. This solution led to two other problems:

1. The states at the margin suffered a loss due to this as the state, even marginally upper than the national average could not avail of its rightful share
2. Even after giving no central assistance to certain states, their per capita plan expenditure was larger than those states which entirely depended on central assistance for the finance of their plans. And it was inevitable for the government not to give any central assistance to these states

The Gadgil Formula, though well-intentioned, did not achieve much success in reducing inter State disparities. For instance, Andhra Pradesh and Tamil Nadu, which came under the low income category at the time, received below average Plan assistance and Bihar and Uttar Pradesh, just managed to get Plan assistance equal to all the States’ average. Therefore, there was an increasing clamour for modification of the formula, especially from the economically backward states.

== Modified Gadgil Formula ==
The formula was modified on the eve of the formulation of the Sixth Plan. The 10 percent indicator for ongoing power and irrigation projects was dropped and the share of per capita income was increased to 20 percent, to be distributed to those states whose per capita incomes were below the national average. The modified Gadgil formula continued for the Sixth and the Seventh Plans. Compared to the allocations in the Fourth and Fifth Plans, the allocations during the Sixth and the Seventh Plans show a definite shift in favour of the poorer states. All the low income states, except Tamil Nadu, received Plan assistance higher than the average income of the 14 states taken into consideration at the time. This can certainly be attributed to the higher weightage given to per capita income as per the modification. Per capita income serves as a suitable proxy for changes in the economy. If the states are ranked according to their per capita income as well as their per capita Plan assistance and the rank correlation coefficient is worked out, it should give a fair idea of the effectiveness of the modified Gadgil Formula in terms of progressivity. The rank correlation coefficients worked out for the four Plan periods are as follows:

Plan Period	Rank Correlation Coefficient
IV	(-)0.17
V	(-)0.04
VI	(-)0.66*
VII	(-)0.72**

Notes: *Significant at 5 percent level **Significant at 1 percent level

The low income states received better allocations during all the four Plan periods, as there is a negative correlation. However, for the Fourth and the Fifth Plans, the correlation coefficients are not significant, which shows that allocations in these periods were only marginally progressive. In the Sixth and the Seventh Plan periods, there was a marked improvement in the progressivity of Plan allocations, as can be deduced from the statistically significant correlation coefficients. Therefore, the modified Gadgil formula resulted in a more progressive distribution of Central Plan assistance.

In the period spanning the beginning of the Fourth Plan to the Seventh Plan, the dependence of the states on Central Plan Assistance for financing their Plan outlays has been declining for all states. Despite this trend, the low income states depended heavily on Central Plan assistance for funding their outlays, despite this assistance increasing considerably after the modification made to the Gadgil formula. Also, it has been seen that the states with a higher per capita outlay are usually the high income states. Therefore, unless the distribution of the Central Plan assistance is made sharply progressive, narrowing down of inter State differentials in per capita outlays will be impossible.

While Plan outlays have increased by over nine times, Central Plan assistance has increased only by half the amount from the Fourth to the Seventh Plan period. This is the reason for persistent inter state inequality. The centre has resorted to funding states for the implementation of Centrally Sponsored Schemes, which form 80 percent of Plan Assistance. This has led to the sidelining of the states’ own Plan outlays. Due to the problem of increasing gaps between the assistance provided and outlay of the states, calls for further revision of the Gadgil Formula increased, which resulted in the next revision of the formula in 1990.

== Gadgil-Mukherjee Formula ==
The National Development Council (NDC) meeting held on October 11, 1990; discussed and approved a New Revised formula. The new revised formula is popularly known as Gadgil-Mukherjee formula after the name of then deputy chairman of Planning commission and the former President of India Dr.Pranab Mukherjee. The new revised formula as approved by NDC is given in the following table. Criteria for inter-state allocation of Plan Assistance

Criteria	Weight (%)
Population	55
Per Capita Income	25
Fiscal Management	5
Special Problems	15
Total	100

Under the new revised formula, Population was given maximum weightage by considering it as most important factor for the allocation of central assistance, but in comparison with old Gadgil formula the weightage has been reduced by 5 percentage points.

The share of Per Capita Income has increased from 20% to 25%. Out of 25%, 20% will continue to be allocated on the principle of The Deviation method (The per capita state domestic product is calculated by taking an average of per capita state domestic product whose actual data are available, for the latest three years.) to those states whose per capita income is below the average national per capita income and the rest 5% will be allocated to all states on the principle of The Distance method (The distance of per capita income of each state from the state which has the highest per capita income is calculated, then these values are multiplied with the respective value of the population of each state. This was done to meet the objections like, less developed states were allocated less and given low weightage, also the states whose per capita income were slightly higher than the average national per capita income, were deprived of share under this particular criterion.

Fiscal management, as a new criterion has been introduced with 5% weightage by discarding the earlier Tax effort criterion which was given 10% weightage in old Gadgil formula. Fiscal management criterion is to be assessed on the basis of a state's actual resource mobilization for its plan in comparison with the target agreed upon the Planning Commission. Therefore, this criterion is considered to be more comprehensive for fiscal efficiency than The Tax effort criterion. The Fiscal Management was given only 5% weightage due to the danger arises from the manner in which it is defined. It can develop an unhealthy competition among the states to show their resources less at the time of preparing initial resource estimates.

The remaining 5% weightage of Tax effort has been given to The Special problems criterion due to which its weightage increased from 10% to 15%. The NDC has defined special problems under these seven heads:

1. Coastal areas
2. Flood and drought prone areas
3. Desert problems
4. Special environmental issues
5. Exceptionally sparse and densely populated areas
6. Problem of slums in urban areas
7. Special financial difficulties for achieving minimum reasonable plan size.

By comparing the new revised Gadgil formula with the old Gadgil formula as a whole, only 85% of the total central assistance has been distributed on the basis of four well defined criteria, whereas, in the old Gadgil formula these criteria were given 90% weightage.

== The Gadgil Formula in 2000 ==
At the advent of the 21st century the formula was reviewed and the component of ‘performance’ by the respective states was adopted. The allocation accruing to the states under this head was 7.5 percent. Within this, 2.5 percent of the allocation was based on tax efforts of the states, 2 percent for fiscal management at state level and 1 percent for undertaking population control measures. Special attention was also paid to the sluggish improvements in female literacy and 1 percent allocation was set aside taking female literacy into account. Timely completion of externally funded projects and land reforms undertaken accounted for the remainder of the 7.5 percent figure.

== The Gadgil Formula-based grants after NITI Ayog 2015 ==
As the Planning Commission has been dismantled, the Gadgil formula based grants have also been discontinued.

== See also ==
- Planning Commission
