= Srishtidnyan =

Srishtidnyan is a monthly science magazine published from Pune, India in Marathi language. It was started in 1928. Its 1000th issue was published in July, 2011. In 2016, a programme was launched with the help of donors to make available the magazine to rural schools in Maharashtra free of cost with the aim to promote scientific inquiry amongst rural students.
