= Five-Year Plans of India =

Integrated Schematic National Programs for Economic Development

The Five-Year Plans of India were a series of national development programmes implemented by the Government of India from 1951 to 2017. Inspired by the Soviet model, these plans aimed to promote balanced economic growth, reduce poverty and modernise key sectors such as agriculture, industry, infrastructure and education.

The Planning Commission, chaired ex-officio by the prime minister, conceptualised and monitored the plans until its replacement by the NITI Aayog (National Institution for Transforming India) in 2015. The plans evolved to address changing developmental priorities, introducing innovations like the Gadgil formula in 1969 for transparent resource allocation to states. While the five-year plans significantly shaped India's economic trajectory, they were discontinued in 2017, transitioning to a more flexible framework under the NITI Aayog.

== History ==
Five-Year Plans (FYPs) are centralized and integrated national socio-economic programs. Joseph Stalin implemented the first Five-Year Plan in the Soviet Union in 1928. Most communist states and several capitalist countries subsequently have adopted them. China continues to use FYPs, although China renamed its Eleventh FYP, from 2006 to 2010, a guideline (guihua), rather than a plan (jihua), to signify the central government's more hands-off approach to development. India launched its First FYP in 1951, soon after independence, under the socialist influence of India's first prime minister, Jawaharlal Nehru.

== First Plan (1951–1956) ==
The first Indian prime minister, Jawaharlal Nehru, presented the First Five-Year Plan to the Parliament of India and needed urgent attention. The First Five-year Plan was launched in 1951 which mainly focused on the development of the primary sector of the economy. The First Five-Year Plan was based on the Harrod–Domar model with few modifications.

This five-year plan's president was Jawaharlal Nehru and Gulzarilal Nanda was the vice-president. The motto of the First Five-Year Plan was "Development of agriculture" and the aim was to solve different problems that formed due to the partition of the nation, second world war. Rebuilding the country after independence was the vision of this plan. Another main target was to lay down the foundation for industry, agriculture development in the country and to provide affordable healthcare, education in low price to people.

The total planned budget of ₹2,069 crore (₹2,378 crore later) was allocated to seven broad areas: irrigation and energy (27.2%), agriculture and community development (17.4%), transport and communications (24%), industry (8.6%), social services (16.6%), rehabilitation of landless farmers (4.1%), and for other sectors and services (2.5%). The most important feature of this phase was active role of state in all economic sectors. Such a role was justified at that time because immediately after independence, India was facing basic problems—deficiency of capital and low capacity to save.

The target growth rate was 2.1% annual gross domestic product (GDP) growth; the achieved growth rate was 3.6% and the net domestic product went up by 15%. The monsoon was good and there were relatively high crop yields, boosting exchange reserves and the per capita income, which increased by 8%. National income increased more than the per capita income due to rapid population growth. Many irrigation projects were initiated during this period, including the Bhakra, Hirakud and Damodar Valley dams. The World Health Organization (WHO), with the Indian government, addressed children's health and reduced infant mortality, indirectly contributing to population growth.

At the end of the plan period in 1956, five Indian Institutes of Technology (IITs) were started as major technical institutions. The University Grants Commission (UGC) was set up to take care of funding and take measures to strengthen the higher education in the country. Contracts were signed to start five steel plants, which came into existence in the middle of the Second Five-Year Plan. The plan was deemed successful for the government having outperformed growth projections.

== Second Plan (1956–1961) ==
The Second Plan focused on the development of the public sector and "rapid Industrialisation". The plan followed the Mahalanobis model, an economic development model developed by the Indian statistician Prasanta Chandra Mahalanobis in 1953. The plan attempted to determine the optimal allocation of investment between productive sectors in order to maximise long-run economic growth. It used the prevalent state-of-the-art techniques of operations research and optimization as well as the novel applications of statistical models developed at the Indian Statistical Institute. The plan assumed a closed economy in which the main trading activity would be centred on importing capital goods. From the Second Five-Year Plan, there was a determined thrust towards substitution of basic and capital good industries.

Hydroelectric power projects and five steel plants at Bhilai, Durgapur, and Rourkela were established with the help of the Soviet Union, Britain (the U.K) and West Germany respectively. Coal production was increased. More railway lines were added in the north east.

The Tata Institute of Fundamental Research and Atomic Energy Commission of India were established as research institutes. In 1957, a talent search and scholarship program was begun to find talented young students to train for work in nuclear power.

The total amount allocated under the Second Five-Year Plan in India was Rs. 48 billion. This amount was allocated among various sectors: power and irrigation, social services, communications and transport, and miscellaneous. The second plan was a period of rising prices. The country also faced foreign exchange crisis. The rapid growth in population slowed down the growth in the per-capita income.

The target growth rate was 4.5% and the actual growth rate was 4.27%.

The plan was criticized by classical liberal economist B.R. Shenoy who noted that the plan's "dependence on deficit financing to promote heavy industrialization was a recipe for trouble". Shenoy argued that state control of the economy would undermine a young democracy. India faced an external payments crisis in 1957, which is viewed as confirmation of Shenoy's argument.

== Third Plan (1961–1966) ==
The Third Five-year Plan stressed agriculture and improvement in the production of wheat, but the brief Sino-Indian War of 1962 exposed weaknesses in the economy and shifted the focus towards the defence industry and the Indian Army. In 1965, India fought a war with Pakistan. There was also a severe drought in 1964-65. The war led to inflation and the priority was shifted to price stabilisation. The construction of dams continued. Many cement and fertilizer plants were also built. Punjab began producing an abundance of wheat.

Many primary schools were started in rural areas. In an effort to bring democracy to the grass-root level, Panchayat elections were started and the states were given more development responsibilities. For the first time India resorted to borrowing from IMF. Rupee value devalued for the first time in 1966.

State electricity boards and state secondary education boards were formed. States were made responsible for secondary and higher education. State road transportation corporations were formed and local road building became a state responsibility.

The target growth rate was 5.6%, but the actual growth rate was 2.4%.

It was based on John Sandy and Sukhamoy Chakraborty's model.

== Plan Holidays (1966–1969) ==
Due to miserable failure of the Third Plan the government was forced to declare "plan holidays" (from 1966 to 1967, 1967–68, and 1968–69). Three annual plans were drawn during this intervening period. During 1966–67 there was again the problem of drought. Equal priority was given to agriculture, its allied activities, and industrial sector. The government of India declared "Devaluation of Rupee" to increase the exports of the country. The main reasons for plan holidays were the war, lack of resources and increase in inflation.

== Fourth Plan (1969–1974) ==
The Fourth Five-Year Plan was delayed for more than a year amid disagreements over India's economic development strategy.

The plan adopted the objective of correcting the earlier trend of increased concentration of wealth and economic power. It was based on the Gadgil formula focusing on growth with stability and progress towards self reliance. At this time Indira Gandhi was the prime minister.

The Indira Gandhi government nationalised 14 major Indian banks (Allahabad Bank, Bank of Baroda, Bank of India, Bank of Maharashtra, Central Bank of India, Canara Bank, Dena Bank, Indian Bank, Indian Overseas Bank, Punjab National Bank, Syndicate Bank, UCO Bank, Union Bank and United Bank of India) and the Green Revolution in India advanced agriculture. In addition, the situation in East Pakistan (now Bangladesh) was becoming dire as the Indo-Pakistan War of 1971 and Bangladesh Liberation War took funds earmarked for industrial development.

- The concept of a buffer stock was first introduced and a buffer stock of 5 million tonnes of food grains was envisaged
- The Drought Prone Area Program (DPAP) was launched

The target growth rate was 5.6%, but the actual growth rate was 3.3%.

== Fifth Plan (1974–1978) ==
The Fifth Five-Year Plan laid stress on employment, poverty alleviation (Garibi Hatao), and justice. The plan also focused on self-reliance in agricultural production and defence. In 1978 the newly elected Morarji Desai government rejected the plan. The Electricity Supply Act was amended in 1975, which enabled the central government to enter into power generation and transmission.

The Indian national highway system was introduced and many roads were widened to accommodate the increasing traffic. Tourism also expanded. The twenty-point programme was launched in 1975. It was followed from 1975 to 1979.

The Minimum Needs Programme (MNP) was introduced in the first year of the Fifth Five-Year Plan (1974–78). The objective of the programme is to provide certain basic minimum needs and thereby improve the living standards of the people. It is prepared and launched by D.P.Dhar.

The target growth rate was 4.4% and the actual growth rate was 4.8%.

== Rolling Plan (1978–1980) ==
The Janata Party government rejected the Fifth Five-Year Plan and introduced a new Sixth Five-Year Plan (1978–1980). This plan was again rejected by the Indian National Congress government in 1980 and a new Sixth Plan was made. The Rolling Plan consisted of three kinds of plans that were proposed. The First Plan was for the present year which comprised the annual budget and the Second was a plan for a fixed number of years, which may be 3, 4 or 5 years. The Second Plan kept changing as per the requirements of the Indian economy. The Third Plan was a perspective plan for long terms i.e. for 10, 15 or 20 years. Hence there was no fixation of dates for the commencement and termination of the plan in the rolling plans. The main advantage of the rolling plans was that they were flexible and were able to overcome the rigidity of fixed Five-Year Plans by mending targets, the object of the exercise, projections and allocations as per the changing conditions in the country's economy. The main disadvantage of this plan was that if the targets were revised each year, it became difficult to achieve the targets laid down in the five-year period and it turned out to be a complex plan. Also, the frequent revisions resulted in the lack of stability in the economy.

== Sixth Plan (1980–1985) ==
The Sixth Five-Year Plan marked the beginning of economic liberalisation. Price controls were eliminated and ration shops were closed. This led to an increase in food prices and an increase in the cost of living. This was the end of Nehruvian socialism. The National Bank for Agriculture and Rural Development was established for development of rural areas on 12 July 1982 by recommendation of the Shivaraman Committee. Family planning was also expanded in order to prevent overpopulation. More prosperous areas of India adopted family planning more rapidly than less prosperous areas, which continued to have a high birth rate. Military Five-Year Plans became coterminous with Planning Commission's plans from this plan onwards.

The Sixth Five-Year Plan was a great success to the Indian economy. The target growth rate was 5.2% and the actual growth rate was 5.7%.

== Seventh Plan (1985–1990) ==
The Seventh Five-Year Plan was led by the Congress Party with Rajiv Gandhi as the prime minister. The plan laid stress on improving the productivity level of industries by upgrading technology.

The main objectives of the Seventh Five-Year Plan were to establish growth in areas of increasing economic productivity, production of food grains, and generating employment through "Social Justice".

As an outcome of the Sixth Five-Year Plan, there had been steady growth in agriculture, controls on the rate of inflation, and favourable balance of payments which had provided a strong base for the Seventh Five-Year Plan to build on the need for further economic growth. The Seventh Plan had striven towards socialism and energy production at large. The thrust areas of the Seventh Five-Year Plan were: social justice, removal of oppression of the weak, using modern technology, agricultural development, anti-poverty programmes, full supply of food, clothing, and shelter, increasing productivity of small- and large-scale farmers, and making India an independent economy.

Based on a 15-year period of striving towards steady growth, the Seventh Plan was focused on achieving the prerequisites of self-sustaining growth by 2000. The plan expected the labour force to grow by 39 million people and employment was expected to grow at the rate of 4% per year.

Some of the expected outcomes of the Seventh Five-Year Plan India are given below:

- Balance of payments (estimates): Export – ₹330 billion (US$3.4 billion), Imports – (-)₹540 billion (US$5.6 billion), Trade Balance – (-)₹210 billion (US$2.2 billion)
- Merchandise exports (estimates): ₹606.53 billion (US$6.3 billion)
- Merchandise imports (estimates): ₹954.37 billion (US$9.9 billion)
- Projections for balance of payments: Export – ₹607 billion (US$6.3 billion), Imports – (-) ₹954 billion (US$9.9 billion), Trade Balance- (-) ₹347 billion (US$3.6 billion)

Under the Seventh Five-Year Plan, India strove to bring about a self-sustained economy in the country with valuable contributions from voluntary agencies and the general populace.

The target growth rate was 5.0% and the actual growth rate was 6.01%. and the growth rate of per capita income was 3.7%.

== Annual Plans (1990–1992) ==
The Eighth Plan could not take off in 1990 due to the fast changing economic situation at the centre and the years 1990–91 and 1991–92 were treated as Annual Plans. The Eighth Plan was finally launched in 1992 after the initiation of structural adjustment policies.

== Eighth Plan (1992–1997) ==
1989–91 was a period of economic instability in India and hence no Five-Year Plan was implemented. Between 1990 and 1992, there were only Annual Plans. In 1991, India faced a crisis in foreign exchange (forex) reserves, left with reserves of only about US$1 billion. Thus, under pressure, the country took the risk of reforming the socialist economy. P.V. Narasimha Rao was the ninth prime minister of the Republic of India and head of Congress Party, and led one of the most important administrations in India's modern history, overseeing a major economic transformation and several incidents affecting national security. At that time Dr. Manmohan Singh (later prime minister of India) launched India's free market reforms that brought the nearly bankrupt nation back from the edge. It was the beginning of liberalization, privatisation and globalization (LPG) in India.

Modernization of industries was a major highlight of the Eighth Plan. Under this plan, the gradual opening of the Indian economy was undertaken to correct the burgeoning deficit and foreign debt. Meanwhile, India became a member of the World Trade Organization on 1 January 1995. The major objectives included, controlling population growth, poverty reduction, employment generation, strengthening the infrastructure, institutional building, tourism management, human resource development, involvement of Panchayati rajs, Nagar Palikas, NGOs, decentralisation and people's participation.

Energy was given priority with 26.6% of the outlay.

The target growth rate was 5.6% and the actual growth rate was 6.8%.

== Ninth Plan (1997–2002) ==
The Ninth Five-Year Plan came after 50 years of Indian Independence. Atal Bihari Vajpayee was the prime minister of India during the Ninth Plan. The Ninth Plan tried primarily to use the latent and unexplored economic potential of the country to promote economic and social growth.

== Tenth Plan (2002–2007) ==
The main objectives of the Tenth Five-Year Plan:

- Attain 8% GDP growth per year.
- Reduction of poverty rate by 5% by 2007.
- Providing gainful and high-quality employment at least to the addition to the labour force.
- Reduction in gender gaps in literacy and wage rates by at least 50% by 2007.
- 20-point program was introduced.
- Target growth: 8.1% – growth achieved: 7.7%.
- The Tenth Plan was expected to follow a regional approach rather than sectors approach to bring down regional inequalities.
- Expenditure of ₹43,825 crore (US$4.6 billion) for tenth five years.

Out of total plan outlay, ₹921,291 crore (US$96 billion) (57.9%) was for central government and ₹691,009 crore (US$72 billion) (42.1%) was for states and union territories.

== Eleventh Plan (2007–2012) ==
- It was in the period of Manmohan Singh as the prime minister.
- It aimed to increase the enrolment in higher education of 18–23 years of age group by 2011–12.
- It focused on distant education, convergence of formal, non-formal, distant and IT education institutions.
- Rapid and inclusive growth (poverty reduction).
- Emphasis on social sector and delivery of service therein.
- Empowerment through education and skill development.
- Reduction of gender inequality.
- Environmental sustainability.
- To increase the growth rate in agriculture, industry and services to 4%, 10% and 9% respectively.
- Reduce total fertility rate to 2.1.
- Provide clean drinking water for all by 2009.
- Increase agriculture growth to 4%.

== Twelfth Plan (2012–2017) ==
The Twelfth Five-Year Plan of the Government of India has been decided to achieve a growth rate of 9% but the National Development Council (NDC) on 27 December 2012 approved a growth rate of 8% for the Twelfth Plan.

The objectives of the Twelfth Five-Year Plan were:

- To create 50 million new job opportunities in non-agricultural sectors.
- To remove gender and social gaps in school enrollment.
- To enhance access to higher education.
- To reduce malnutrition amongst children aged 0–3 years.
- To provide electricity to all villages.
- To ensure that 50% of the rural population has access to proper drinking water.
- To increase green coverage by 1 million hectares every year.
- To provide access to banking services to 90% of households.

== Future ==
With the Planning Commission dissolved, no more formal plans are made for the economy, but Five-Year Defence Plans continue to be made. The latest would have been 2017–2022. However, there is no Thirteenth Five-Year Plan.

== See also ==
- Five-year plans of China
- Five-Year Plans of Romania
- Five-year plans of the Soviet Union
- Common minimum programme
