= Deaths in July 1989 =

The following is a list of notable deaths in July 1989.

Entries for each day are listed alphabetically by surname. A typical entry lists information in the following sequence:

- Name, age, country of citizenship at birth, subsequent country of citizenship (if applicable), reason for notability, cause of death (if known), and reference.

== July 1989 ==
=== 1 ===
- William Ching, 75, American actor (D.O.A., Pat and Mike), heart failure.
- Joan Cooper, 66, British actress, stomach cancer.
- Dora Gaitskell, 88, Russian Empire–born British Labour Party politician, member of the House of Lords.
- Veriano Ginesi, 82, Italian actor (Even Angels Eat Beans).
- Eric Holland, 68, New Zealand politician, member of the House of Representatives.
- Sumant Moolgaokar, 82, Indian industrialist, architect of Tata Motors.
- António Morais, 54, Portuguese footballer and manager (FC Porto), car crash.
- Viktor Nekipelov, 60, Soviet poet and writer, member of Moscow Helsinki Group.
- Louise Varèse, 98, American writer and translator of French literature.
- James Wicks, 88, British lawyer and Chief Justice of Kenya.

=== 2 ===
- Willie Banks, 43, American NFL player (Washington Redskins, New York Giants, New England Patriots).
- Brendan Crinion, 65, Irish politician.
- Andrei Gromyko, 79, Soviet politician and diplomat, chairman of Presidium of the Supreme Soviet, minister of foreign affairs, stroke.
- Jean Leguay, 79, French Nazi, convicted war criminal, cancer.
- Josefa Levula, 59, Fijian sprinter, rugby union and rugby league player (Fiji rugby union team, Rochdale Hornets rugby league club).
- Jean Painlevé, 86, French photographer and filmmaker.
- Franklin J. Schaffner, 69, Japanese-born American director (Patton, Planet of the Apes), lung cancer.
- Wilfrid Sellars, 77, American philosopher.
- Thomas Ward, 84, Irish cricketer.
- Ben Wright, 74, English actor (The Sound of Music), complications of heart surgery.

=== 3 ===
- Jim Backus, 76, American actor (Gilligan's Island, Mr. Magoo), pneumonia.
- Frans G. Hukom, 73, Indonesian footballer.
- Abe Kesh, 55, American disc jockey and record producer (Blue Cheer).
- Okey Patteson, 90, American politician, governor of West Virginia, pneumonia.
- Mary Shanley, 93, American police officer and detective.
- Loyce Whiteman, 76, American singer.

=== 4 ===
- Antonio Roldán Betancur, 43, Colombian politician, governor of Antioquia, assassinated.
- Peter Gillett, 75, British Army general.
- Jack Haig, 76, English actor ('Allo 'Allo!), stomach cancer.
- Bob Hawk, 81, American radio quizmaster and comic.
- Win Maung, 73, Burmese politician, President of Burma.
- Leyla Mammadbeyova, 79, Azerbaijani aviator.
- Jim Missouri, 72, American Negro Leagues baseball player.
- Vic Perrin, 73, American actor (The Outer Limits), cancer.
- Nelson Sullivan, 41, American videographer, heart attack.

=== 5 ===
- Clem Conroy, 62, Australian rules footballer.
- Bill Daddio, 73, American football player, coach, and scout.
- Sirarpie Der Nersessian, 92, Armenian art historian.
- Arthur Bispo do Rosário, 78–80, Brazilian artist, heart attack.
- Ernesto Halffter, 84, Spanish composer and conductor, heart failure.
- Odus Mitchell, 90, American college football player and coach (North Texas State Eagles).
- George Sullivan, 92, American NFL player (Frankford Yellow Jackets).
- Maria Vassiliou, 38, English-born Cypriot actress (The Travelling Players), cancer.
- Berthold Wolpe, 83, German-born English typographer and type designer.

=== 6 ===
- Jean Bouise, 60, French actor (Coup de tête).
- János Kádár, 77, Hungarian politician, general secretary of the Hungarian Socialist Workers' Party, pneumonia.
- Reuven Shari, 86, Russian-born Israeli politician, member of the Knesset (1949-1955).

=== 7 ===
- Irene Bernasconi, 92, Argentinian marine biologist (echinoderms).
- James Carney, 75, Irish Celtic scholar.
- Moshe Kol, 78, Israeli politician, Knesset representative, signatory of the Israeli declaration of independence.
- Félix Unden, 87, Luxembourgian Olympic water polo player (1928).
- Donald S. Voorhees, 72, American district judge (Western District of Washington).

=== 8 ===
- Alice King Chatham, 81, American sculptor, designed personal protective equipment (United States Air Force, NASA).
- August Haußleiter, 84, German politician and journalist.
- Platon Maiboroda, 70, Ukrainian composer.
- Louis Overbeeke, 62, Dutch footballer.
- Paul Raeth, 90, French Olympic diver (1924).
- Jóvito Villalba, 81, Venezuelan lawyer and politician, member of the Generation of 1928, founder of the Democratic Republican Union.
- Kurt Wagner, 84, East German soldier and politician, Deputy Defence Minister.

=== 9 ===
- Andrex, 82, French film actor.
- Lillian Friedman Astor, 77, American animator (Betty Boop).
- Salvatore Colombo, 66, Italian Catholic prelate, bishop of Mogadishu, assassinated.
- Abdellah Guennoun, 80, Moroccan writer and historian.
- Piet Lieftinck, 86, Dutch politician, member of the House of Representatives and Senate, Minister of Finance, heart failure.
- Clem McCann, 77, Australian rules footballer.
- Kathy Mulholland, 48, American Olympic speed skater (1960).
- Ferenc Orbán, 85, Hungarian Olympic high jumper (1928).
- Gustav Östling, 74, Swedish Olympic long-distance runner (1948, 1952).
- Elliott Sanger, 92, American co-founder of WQXR-FM.
- William Skeet, 82, New Zealand cricketer.

=== 10 ===
- Mel Blanc, 81, American voice actor and radio personality (Bugs Bunny, Daffy Duck, Sylvester the Cat), emphysema and coronary artery disease.
- Rick Carroll, 42, American program director for radio station KROQ-FM, AIDS.
- Jean-Michel Charlier, 64, Belgian comics writer (Buck Danny), co-founder of Pilote.
- Frances Gardner, 76, English cardiologist, introduced angiocardiography to Britain (Royal Free Hospital).
- Nilita Vientós Gastón, 86, Puerto Rican writer and journalist.
- Grace Gibson, 84, American-born Australian radio entrepreneur, executive and producer.
- Duncan McGuire, 46, Australian musician, songwriter, and recording producer (Ayers Rock).
- Tommy Trinder, 80, English comedian, host of Sunday Night at the London Palladium.

=== 11 ===
- Irv Comp, 70, American NFL footballer (Green Bay Packers).
- Laurence Curtis, 95, American attorney and politician, member of the U.S. House of Representatives (1953-1963).
- Horia Macellariu, 95, Romanian navy rear admiral in Second World War.
- Vic Maile, 55–56, British record producer, cancer.
- Juanelo Mirabal, 88, Cuban American Negro Leagues baseball player.
- Laurence Olivier, 82, English actor and director (Hamlet, Wuthering Heights, Rebecca), renal failure.
- Richard Travis, 76, American actor (The Man Who Came to Dinner).
- Robert Trias, 66, American karate pioneer.
- Tommy Tucker, 86, American bandleader ("I Don't Want to Set the World on Fire").
- Sylwester Zych, 39, Polish Catholic priest, likely murdered.

=== 12 ===
- Wes Carlson, 87, American NFL player (Green Bay Packers) and military officer.
- Sidney Hook, 86, American philosopher, heart failure.
- Bill O'Connor, 81, Australian rules footballer.
- Carlos Puebla, 71, Cuban singer, guitarist and composer.
- Tunku Abdul Rahman, 55, Malaysian royal, Crown Prince of Johor.
- Benjamin B. Rubinstein, 84, Finnish-born American physician and psychoanalyst, cancer.
- Prince Wolfgang of Hesse, 92, Crown Prince of Finland.

=== 13 ===
- A. Amirthalingam, 61, Sri Lankan politician, member of Parliament, Leader of the Opposition, assassinated.
- John Bryant, 72, American actor (The Virginian).
- Abdul Rahman Ghassemlou, 58, Iranian Kurdish politician, assassinated.
- Homer Gudelsky, 78, American real estate developer (Tysons Corner Center, Westfield Wheaton), leukemia.
- Len Holland, 66, Australian rules footballer.
- John Kennedy, 58, British cyclist.
- Bill Lowenthal, 79, Australian rules footballer.
- Davud Monshizadeh, 74, Iranian Nazi, founder of SUMKA.
- Arnaldo Ochoa, 58–59, Cuban army general, executed.
- Vern Olsen, 71, American MLB player (Chicago Cubs).
- Pedro Orata, 90, Filipino educator, "father of Barrio High Schools".
- Alberto Radi, 69, Italian Olympic rower (1948).
- V. Yogeswaran, 55, Sri Lankan lawyer, politician and Member of Parliament, assassinated.

=== 14 ===
- Said S. Bedair, 40, Egyptian microwave scientist, death ostensibly from a fall.
- Frank Bell, 72, British educator, founded Bell Educational Trust.
- Jack Boothman, 82, Australian rules footballer.
- Paul-Heinrich Lange, 80, German Olympic sailor (1952).
- Cosmo Sardo, 80, American actor.

=== 15 ===
- Alexander Altunin, 67, Soviet army general and politician.
- Will Bradley, 77, American trombonist and bandleader ("Beat Me Daddy, Eight to the Bar").
- Laurie Cunningham, 33, English international footballer (West Bromwich Albion, England), car crash.
- Nesuhi Ertegun, 71, Turkish-born American record producer, co-founded New York Cosmos, complications of cancer surgery.
- Maria Kuncewiczowa, 93, Russian Empire–born Polish novelist (Cudzoziemka).
- Artur Sandauer, 75, Polish literary critic, essayist and professor.
- Elizabeth Savage, 71, American novelist and short-story writer (The Last Night at the Ritz).
- Jack Scholes, 71, New Zealand Olympic sailor (1972).
- Teiichi Suzuki, 100, Japanese army general, Minister of State, member of the House of Peers, heart failure.
- William F. Temple, 75, British science fiction writer (Four Sided Triangle).
- Dennis Wilson, 69, British pianist, composer and conductor.

=== 16 ===
- John N. Dempsey, 74, Irish-born American politician, Governor of Connecticut, lung cancer.
- Nicolás Guillén, 87, Cuban poet, journalist and political activist, Parkinson's disease.
- Brynmor Jones, 85, Welsh-born vice-chancellor of the University of Hull.
- Herbert von Karajan, 81, Austrian conductor, principal conductor of the Berlin Philharmonic, heart attack.
- Jack Kasley, 73, American Olympic swimmer (1936).
- Uma Maheswaran, 44, Sri Lankan Tamil rebel, founder of the People's Liberation Organisation of Tamil Eelam, assassinated.

=== 17 ===
- Dudley Brooks, 75, American jazz pianist and composer.
- Paul C, 24, American hip hopper, producer and engineer, murdered.
- Suzanne Dechevaux-Dumesnil, 89, French pianist and wife of Samuel Beckett, member of the French Resistance.
- Dayal Kaur Khalsa, 46, American-born Canadian author and illustrator of children's books, breast cancer.
- Paul Lemerle, 86, French founding president of the International Association of Byzantine Studies.
- John McAnulty, Northern Irish grain importer and informant, killed by the IRA.
- Luis Muñoz, 61, Spanish Olympic bobsledder (1956).
- Vuppuluri Ganapathi Sastry, 100, Indian Sanskrit and Vedas scholar and writer.
- František Šimůnek, 78, Czech Olympic Nordic skier (1932, 1936, 1948).

=== 18 ===
- Donnie Moore, 35, American Major League baseball player (California Angels), suicide.
- Oonah Keogh, 86, Irish member of the Dublin Stock Exchange.
- René Kohn, 56, Luxembourgian Olympic swimmer (1952, 1956).
- Marika Nezer, 82–83, Greek actress.
- Shmuel Rodensky, 86, Russian-born Israeli actor (Tevye and His Seven Daughters, The Odessa File), heart attack.
- Rebecca Schaeffer, 21, American actress (My Sister Sam), murdered.
- Frank Waite, 84, Canadian NHL player (New York Rangers).
- Mihailo Živanović, 61, Serbian clarinetist, composer and conductor.

=== 19 ===
- Eric Chase, 58, Guyanese cricketer.
- J. M. Cohen, 86, British translator of European literature into English.
- Colin Crowe, 75, British diplomat, Permanent Representative to the United Nations.
- Nigel Dennis, 77, English writer, playwright and magazine editor (Cards of Identity).
- Eric Grantham, 75, British Olympic sports shooter (1968).
- Joe Greene, 77, American Negro Leagues baseball player.
- Shinjō Itō, 83, Japanese founder of the Buddhist school Shinnyo-en.
- Walter Karp, 55, American journalist, historian and writer (American Heritage, Horizon).
- Vivian Reed, 95, American silent-screen actress (His Majesty, the Scarecrow of Oz).
- Kazimierz Sabbat, 76, Prime minister and president of the Polish government in exile, heart attack.
- Carl-Heinz Schroth, 87, German actor and film director.
- Benjamin Tammuz, 70, Israeli writer and artist.
- Lavinia Williams, 73, American dancer and dance educator, heart attack.
- John Wyhonic, 69, American NFL player (Philadelphia Eagles).
- Notable Americans killed in United Airlines Flight 232:
  - Jay Ramsdell, 25, commissioner of the Continental Basketball Association.
  - John Kenneth Stille, 59, chemist (Stille reaction).

=== 20 ===
- Forrest H. Anderson, 76, American politician, governor and attorney general of Montana, suicide.
- Valentine Bargmann, 81, German-born American mathematician and theoretical physicist, heart failure.
- José Augusto Brandão, 78, Brazilian footballer.
- Juan Carlos Altavista, 60, Argentinian actor and comedian, Wolff-Parkinson-White syndrome.
- Lauro Corona, 32, Brazilian actor.
- Karen DeWolf, 85, American screenwriter and novelist (Blondie).
- Marie-Madeleine Fourcade, 79, leader of French Resistance network "Alliance".
- Bruce Greatbatch, 72, British Colonial Service officer and soldier, governor of the Seychelles.
- Erwin Sietas, 78, German Olympic swimmer (1928, 1932, 1936).
- John Sleeuwenhoek, 45, English professional footballer (Aston Villa).
- Mary Treen, 82, American film and television actress (The Joey Bishop Show), cancer.
- Yannis Tsarouchis, 79, Greek modernist painter and set designer (Cafe Neon).
- Harry Worth, 71, English comedian and ventriloquist, spinal cancer.

=== 21 ===
- Reg Bennett, 82, Australian rules footballer.
- Donald Brittain, 61, Canadian film director and producer (Paperland: The Bureaucrat Observed).
- James M. Collins, 73, American businessman and politician, member of the U.S. House of Representatives (1968-1983).
- M Osman Ghani, 77, Bangladeshi scientist, vice-chancellor of the University of Dhaka.
- Derrick Gregory, 39, English drug smuggler, executed.
- Mushtaq Ali Khan, 78, Indian classical sitar player.
- Genevieve Naylor, 74, American photographer and photojournalist.
- Chafia Rochdi, 78, Tunisian singer and actress.
- Doug Timm, 29, American composer.
- William T. Whisner Jr., 65, American pilot in U.S. Air Force, complications from wasp sting.

=== 22 ===
- Janet Lee Bouvier, 81, American socialite, mother of Jacqueline Kennedy Onassis, Alzheimer's disease.
- Frank Fleming, 70, American Negro Leagues baseball player.
- Pete Franceschi, 69, American AAFC player (San Francisco 49ers).
- Paul Christoph Mangelsdorf, 90, American botanist and agronomist (maize).
- Bob Mullens, 66, American professional basketballer (Toronto Huskies), brain tumour.
- Clyde Sowell, 57, American Negro Leagues baseball player.
- Martti Talvela, 54, Finnish operatic bass, heart attack.
- Frank Thompson, 70, American politician, member of the U.S. House of Representatives (1955-1980), esophageal cancer.
- Marin Varbanov, 56, Bulgarian painter.
- Hally Wood, 66, American musician and singer.

=== 23 ===
- Donald Barthelme, 58, American short story writer, novelist and journalist, throat cancer.
- Archduchess Charlotte of Austria, 68, daughter of emperor Charles I of Austria.
- Hank Greenspun, 79, American publisher of Las Vegas Sun newspaper.
- Thevis Guruge, Sri Lankan broadcaster with Radio Ceylon, murdered.
- Claude Harmon, 73, American professional golfer, heart failure.
- Angel Planells, 87, Spanish surrealist painter.
- Daniel Rhodes, 78, American artist, heart attack.
- Michael Sundin, 28, English television presenter, actor and dancer (Blue Peter), AIDS.
- Alexander Weygers, 87, Dutch East Indies–born American artist, engineer and author.

=== 24 ===
- Marco Acerbi, 40, Italian Olympic hurdler (1972).
- Tariq Ata, 45-46, Pakistani cricket umpire.
- Walter Dick, 83, Scottish-born American international footballer (Providence F.C., U.S.A.).
- Charlie Gallagher, 51, Irish Gaelic footballer (Cavan), drowned.
- Wally Kimmick, 92, American MLB player (St. Louis Cardinals, Cincinnati Reds, Philadelphia Phillies).
- Leen Korpershoek, 85, Dutch Olympic swimmer (1928).
- Wolfgang Losack, 67, German Olympic sports shooter (1960).
- Sunshine Sammy Morrison, 76, American actor, comedian and dancer, cancer.
- Eleanor Raymond, 102, American architect (Dover Sun House).
- Udagawa Katsutarō, 49, Japanese sumo wrestler.

=== 25 ===
- Kullervo Leskinen, 80, Finnish Olympic sports shooter (1948, 1952).
- Steve Rubell, 45, American entrepreneur, owner of New York City disco Studio 54, hepatitis complicated by AIDS.

=== 26 ===
- Derek Ball, British sound engineer and Academy Award winner (Star Wars).
- Eric Comerford, 77, Australian rules footballer.
- Vicente Zito, 76, Argentine footballer.

=== 27 ===
- Cyril Lloyd, 83, British Army officer.
- Warren Low, 83, American film editor (Now, Voyager, Out of the Fog).
- Philip R. Miller, 71, American judge (United States Court of Federal Claims).
- Albert Planchon, 84, French Olympic sports shooter (1952).
- Walter Scott, 89, Australian rules footballer.
- Dolf Sternberger, 81, German philosopher and political scientist.

=== 28 ===
- B. V. Bowden, 79, English scientist, Minister of State for Education and Science.
- Roland Kotani, 35, American politician, member of the Hawaii House of Representatives, murdered.
- Hermógenes Netto, 75, Brazilian Olympic cyclist (1936).
- Patalino, 67, Portuguese footballer.
- Jeff Richards, 64, American actor (Seven Brides for Seven Brothers), respiratory failure.
- Donnell Young, 101, American Olympic sprinter (1912).

=== 29 ===
- Nancy Andrews, 68, American actress and singer, heart attack.
- Charley Bowser, 90, American college football coach.
- Osvaldo Brandão, 72, Brazilian footballer and coach (Internacional).
- Joe Littlejohn, 81, American NASCAR driver.
- Henry Shenk, 82, American college football player and coach (Kansas Jayhawks).
- Alan Wright, 84, English cricketer.
- Rudy Zamora, 79, Mexican-born American animator (The Rocky and Bullwinkle Show, The Jetsons).

=== 30 ===
- Lily Broberg, 65, Danish stage and film actress.
- Paul DiCocco Sr., 65, American racketeer and illegal gambler, associate of mobster Carmine Galante, complications from a heart transplant.
- Wes Fesler, 81, American college football, basketball and baseball player and coach.
- Lane Frost, 25, American professional rodeo cowboy, killed by bull.
- Amadeo Labarta, 84, Spanish Olympic footballer (1928).
- Octave Mannoni, 89, French psychoanalyst and author.

=== 31 ===
- Premakeerthi de Alwis, 42, Sri Lankan radio and television broadcaster and lyricist, murdered.
- Leon Ferguson, 66, Australian Olympic water polo player (1948).
- Eddie Gannon, 78, Irish footballer.
- Michael Harrington, 61, American author, political activist and radio commentator, esophageal cancer.
- Bull Moose Jackson, 70, American rhythm-and-blues singer and saxophonist, lung cancer.
- Geronima Pecson, 92, Filipina educator and suffragette, first woman senator of the Philippines.
- Anne Roselle, 96, Hungarian and American operatic soprano
- George Augustus Vaughn Jr., 92, American fighter ace in World War I, brain tumour.
- Zhou Yang, 80, Chinese literary theorist, translator and Marxist.

=== Unknown date ===
- Hui Yuyu, 79–80, Chinese politician.
