= Uppaluri =

Uppaluri is a Telugu surname originating from Andhra Pradesh in India. They mostly belong to the class of Brahmins. Alternative spellings of this surname include Uppuluri, Vuppuluri and Vuppulury.

Notable people with the surname include:

- Subbaraya Sarma (born Uppaluri Subbaraya Sarma, 1947), Indian actor
- U. G. Krishnamurti (1918–2007), Indian philosopher
- Uppuluri Mallikarjuna Sarma (1939–2019), Indian politician
- U. S. R. Murty, Indian mathematician and professor
- Vuppuluri Ganapathi Sastry (1888–1989), Indian Sanskrit scholar, writer and spiritual teacher
