= Reg Bennett =

Reg Bennett may refer to:

- Reg Bennett (footballer)
- Reg Bennett (tennis)

== See also ==
- Reginald Bennett, British politician, yachtsman, psychiatrist and painter
