= Sangamon (disambiguation) =

Sangamon is a county in Illinois. It may also mean:

- the Sangamon River
- Sangamon, Illinois, an unincorporated community in Illinois
- Sangamon Township, Piatt County, Illinois
- Sangamonian, a climate period 125,000 - 75,000 years ago
- multiple ships named USS Sangamon
- the Sangamon (train), a train operated by the Illinois Terminal Railroad
