= Wes Carlson =

American football player (1901–1989)

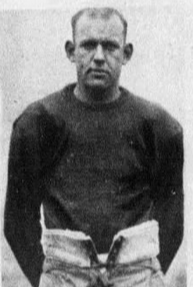
- Carlson, c. 1923

No. 11
- Position: Guard / tackle

Personal information
- Born: July 24, 1901; Racine, Wisconsin, U.S.
- Died: July 12, 1989 (aged 87); St. Joseph, Michigan, U.S.
- Listed height: 6 ft 1 in (1.85 m)
- Listed weight: 210 lb (95 kg)

Career information
- College: Detroit (1922–1925)

Career history
- Green Bay Packers (1926)
- Stats at Pro Football Reference

Wesley W. Carlson (July 24, 1901 – July 12, 1989) was an American professional football player and military officer. A guard and tackle, he played college football for the Detroit Titans and later played one season in the National Football League (NFL) for the Green Bay Packers in 1926. After his football career, Carlson was a decorated officer in the United States Navy and reached the rank of commander. He served in World War II in Africa, the Pacific and Asia, receiving the Bronze Star Medal and the Silver Star.

== Early life ==
Carlson was born on July 24, 1901, in Racine, Wisconsin, where he grew up. His father, Sam Carlsen, was a captain in the United States Coast Guard. His family's last name was spelled "Carlsen", with an "e", but one of his teachers in elementary school misspelled it with an "o" and he subsequently used the last name "Carlson". After high school, he joined the University of Detroit and tried out for the Detroit Titans football team in 1922 to play tackle. He played three seasons for the team, earning letters in at least 1924 and 1925. He also sometimes played at guard for Detroit. The Detroit Free Press noted that he "never displayed the football ability expected of a man with his physical and mental assets" until mid-season as a senior, when he played against Quantico Marines and "came to life" while "astonishing" team fans with his performance. He played his last collegiate game later that year against Bucknell before graduating.

During his football career, Carlson was nicknamed "Brute".

== Professional career ==
In 1926, Carlson signed to play professional football with the Green Bay Packers of the National Football League (NFL). He made the team and was used as a guard and tackle for the Packers during the 1926 NFL season. The Journal Times noted that "his bald head and 210 pounds are on the scene of many a play." He appeared in four games, two as a starter, for the Packers in 1926, helping them compile a record of 7–3–3. According to The Official Encyclopedia of Football, Carlson also played for the Detroit Panthers in the NFL that year.

== Military career and later life ==
In 1926, Carlson joined the United States Navy Reserve. He was commissioned in 1932 as an ensign and rose to be commanding officer for his Naval Reserve division before being called to active duty in 1940 to serve in World War II. He served around the world and later said in 1954 that India was "the only country he hasn't visited that has an ocean seaport."

Carlson participated in the North Africa landings as a boat group commander and later received the Bronze Star Medal. He served in the Pacific, including at various South Pacific islands, Australia and New Zealand, and was part of a detachment that trained Australian soldiers for beach landings. He later was transferred to the USS Sangamon escort carrier, participating in 10 engagements in the Pacific. The Sangamon crew was awarded the Presidential Unit Citation after surviving damage by a Japanese kamikaze attack. He served in the Philippines, for which he received a Silver Star, and participated in the Battle of Okinawa, for which he was given a Bronze Star with a gold star. He became a commander in 1945 and was a part of 12 major engagements during the war.

Following the war, Carlson served on the USS Tarawa before later being transferred to the USS General William Mitchell, where he was an executive officer. The Tarawa was named after the island of the same name, which Carlson's task force had captured during the war. He then served as commanding officer for the USS Zelma, a refrigeration ship for Pacific bases, before becoming the district material officer for the 9th Naval District headquarters in 1949. He later received the title of assistant chief of staff for logistics and held other positions at the headquarters. In 1954, he was named the commanding officer for the Naval Reserve Officers Training Corps in Detroit. He later retired, having received 14 medals and service ribbons.

Carlson worked at the Saranac Corp. in Benton Harbor, Michigan, after his military career. With his wife, Alice, he had two sons and two daughters. He died on July 12, 1989, at a hospital in St. Joseph, Michigan, at the age of 87.
