= Sonia Gandhi =

Indian politician (born 1946)

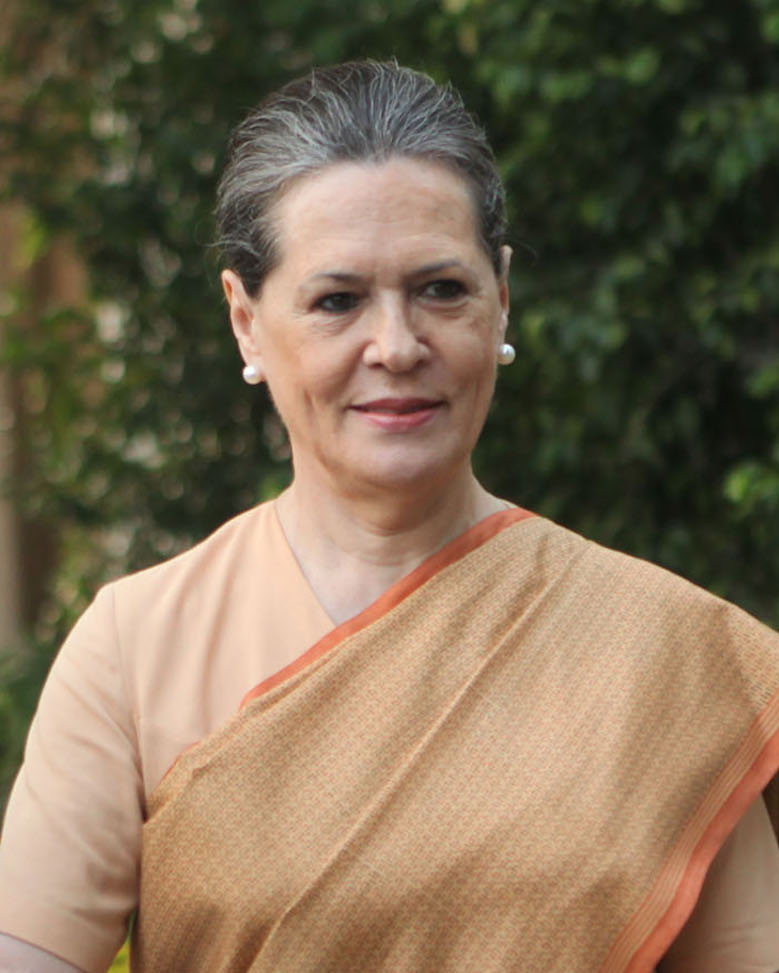
- Gandhi in 2013

Member of Parliament, Rajya Sabha
- Incumbent
- Assumed office 3 April 2024
- Preceded by: Manmohan Singh
- Constituency: Rajasthan

Parliamentary Chairperson of the Indian National Congress
- Incumbent
- Assumed office 13 October 1999
- Preceded by: Sharad Pawar

President of the Indian National Congress
- Interim; 10 August 2019 – 26 October 2022
- Preceded by: Rahul Gandhi
- Succeeded by: Mallikarjun Kharge
- In office 14 March 1998 – 16 December 2017
- Vice President: Jitendra Prasada (1999–2001); Rahul Gandhi (from 2013)
- Preceded by: Sitaram Kesri
- Succeeded by: Rahul Gandhi

Chairperson of the United Progressive Alliance
- In office 6 May 2004 – 18 July 2023
- Preceded by: Office established
- Succeeded by: Mallikarjun Kharge (as chairperson of INDIA)

Chairperson of the National Advisory Council
- In office 29 March 2010 – 26 May 2014
- Prime Minister: Manmohan Singh
- Preceded by: Office established
- Succeeded by: Office abolished
- In office 4 June 2004 – 23 March 2006
- Prime Minister: Manmohan Singh
- Preceded by: Office established
- Succeeded by: Office abolished

Leader of the Opposition in Lok Sabha
- In office 13 October 1999 – 6 February 2004
- Preceded by: Sharad Pawar
- Succeeded by: L. K. Advani

Member of Parliament, Lok Sabha
- In office 17 May 2004 – 2 April 2024
- Preceded by: Satish Sharma
- Succeeded by: Rahul Gandhi
- Constituency: Rae Bareli, Uttar Pradesh
- In office 10 October 1999 – 17 May 2004
- Preceded by: Sanjay Singh
- Succeeded by: Rahul Gandhi
- Constituency: Amethi, Uttar Pradesh

Spouse of the Prime Minister of India
- In role 31 October 1984 – 2 December 1989
- Prime Minister: Rajiv Gandhi
- Preceded by: Gayatri Devi
- Succeeded by: Sita Kumari Singh

Personal details
- Born: Sonia Maino; 9 December 1946 (age 79) Lusiana, Vicenza, Italy
- Party: Indian National Congress
- Spouse: Rajiv Gandhi (m. 1968; died 1991)
- Children: Rahul; Priyanka
- Relatives: See Nehru–Gandhi family
- Education: Bell Educational Trust
- Occupation: Politician

Sonia Gandhi (Hindi: [ˈsoːnɪjaː ˈɡaːndʱiː], Italian: [ˈsɔːnja ˈɡandi]; née Maino [ˈmaino]; born 9 December 1946) is an Indian politician. She is the longest-serving president of the Indian National Congress, a big-tent liberal political party, which governed India for most of its post-independence history. She took over as the party leader in 1998, seven years after the assassination of Rajiv Gandhi, her husband and a former Prime Minister of India, and remained in office until 2017 after serving for twenty-two years. (Note: Sources.) She returned to the post as interim president in 2019 and remained the President for another three years until 2022.

Born in a small village near Vicenza, Italy, Gandhi was raised in a Roman Catholic family. After completing her primary education at local schools, she moved for language classes to Cambridge, England, where she met Rajiv Gandhi, and later married him in 1968. She then moved to India and started living with her mother-in-law, the then-Prime Minister of India, Indira Gandhi, at the latter's New Delhi residence. Sonia Gandhi, however, kept away from the public sphere, even during the years of her husband's premiership.

Following her husband's assassination, Gandhi was invited by Congress leaders to lead the party, but she declined. She agreed to join politics in 1997 after much pleading from the party; the following year, she was nominated for party president. (Note: Sources describing Gandhi's initial reluctance and eventual election.) Under her leadership, the Congress went on to form the government post the 2004 elections in coalition with other centre-left political parties. Gandhi has since been credited for being instrumental in formulating the United Progressive Alliance (UPA), which was re-elected to power in 2009. Gandhi declined the premiership following the 2004 victory; she instead led the ruling alliance and the National Advisory Council. (Note: Sources describing Gandhi's leadership of the UPA and declining the premiership.)

Over the course of her career, Gandhi presided over the advisory councils credited for the formation and subsequent implementation of such rights-based development and welfare schemes as the Right to Information, Food Security Bill, and MGNREGA, as she drew criticism related to the National Herald case during the Manmohan Singh premiership. Her foreign birth has also been a subject of much debate and controversy. (Note: Sources discussing the welfare schemes and controversies.) Gandhi's active participation in politics began to reduce during the latter half of the UPA government's second term owing to health concerns. She stepped down as the Congress president in December 2017 but returned to lead the party in August 2019.

Currently an elected member of the Rajya Sabha representing Rajasthan since 2024, Gandhi has often been cited among the most powerful women in the world and has had considerable influence in Indian politics, especially during the UPA governments and in leading the Congress party. (Note: Sources discussing the listing.)

== Early life ==
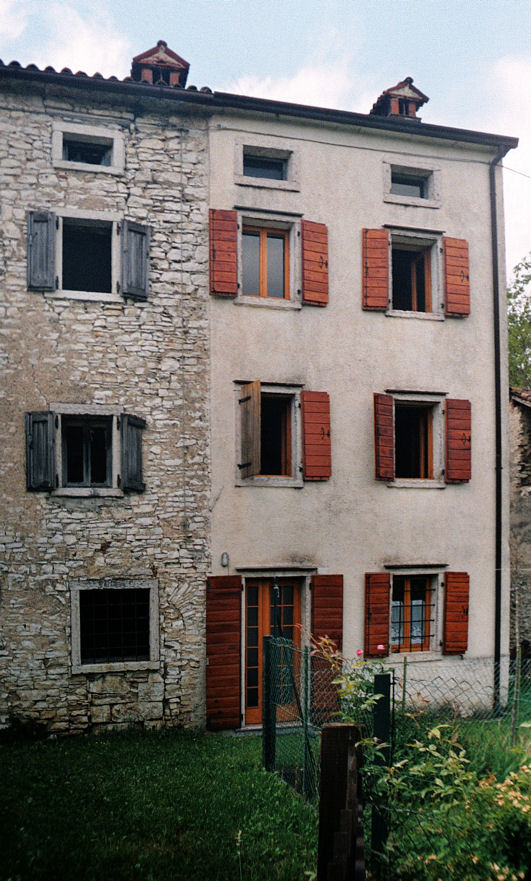
Sonia Gandhi's birthplace, 31, Contrada Maini (Maini street), Lusiana, Italy (the house on the right)

Sonia Maino was born on 9 December 1946 to Stefano and Paola Maino in Lusiana (in Maini street), a historically Cimbrian-speaking village about 35 km from Vicenza in Veneto, Italy. She was one of three siblings: Sonia, Nadia and Anoushka, raised in a traditional Roman Catholic Christian family. Sonia spent her adolescence in Orbassano, a town near Turin. She attained primary education attending the local Catholic schools; one of her early teachers described her as "a diligent little girl, [who] studied as much as was necessary".

Stefano, who was a building mason, established a small construction business in Orbassano. It is alleged that in an interview with Jawid Laiq published in Outlook in 1998, Stefano claimed that he had fought against the Soviet military alongside Hitler's Wehrmacht on the eastern front in World War II, and that he was a loyal supporter of Benito Mussolini and Italy's National Fascist Party. As per the said article, the family house had leather bound books on writings and speeches of Mussolini. Stefano had named Sonia and her elder sister Nadia in the memory of the Italian participation in the Eastern Front. He died in 1983. Gandhi's two sisters still reside in Orbassano.

Gandhi completed her schooling at the age of 13; her final report card read: "intelligent, diligent, committed [...] would succeed well at the high school for teachers". She aspired to become a flight attendant. In 1964, she went to study English at the Bell Educational Trust's language school in the city of Cambridge. The following year, she met Rajiv Gandhi at the Varsity Restaurant, where she was working as a part-time waitress, while he was enrolled for an engineering degree in the Trinity College at the University of Cambridge. In this context, the Times, London reported, "Mrs Gandhi was an 18-year-old student at a small language college in Cambridge in 1965, [...] when she met a handsome young engineering student". The couple married in 1968, in a Hindu ceremony, following which she moved into the house of her mother-in-law and then Prime Minister, Indira Gandhi.

The couple had two children, Rahul Gandhi (born 1970) and Priyanka Vadra (born 1972). Despite belonging to the influential Nehru family, Sonia and Rajiv avoided all involvement in politics. Rajiv worked as an airline pilot while Sonia took care of her family. She spent considerable amount of time with her mother-in-law, Indira Gandhi; she recalled her experience in a 1985 interview with the Hindi-language magazine Dharmyug, "She [Indira] showered me with all her affection and love". Soon after the latter's ousting from office in 1977 in the aftermath of the Indian Emergency, the Rajiv family contemplated moving abroad for a short time. When Rajiv entered politics in 1982 after the death of his younger brother Sanjay Gandhi in a plane crash on 23 June 1980, Sonia continued to focus on her family and avoided all contact with the public.

== Political career ==
=== Rajiv Gandhi's premiership (1984–1989) ===
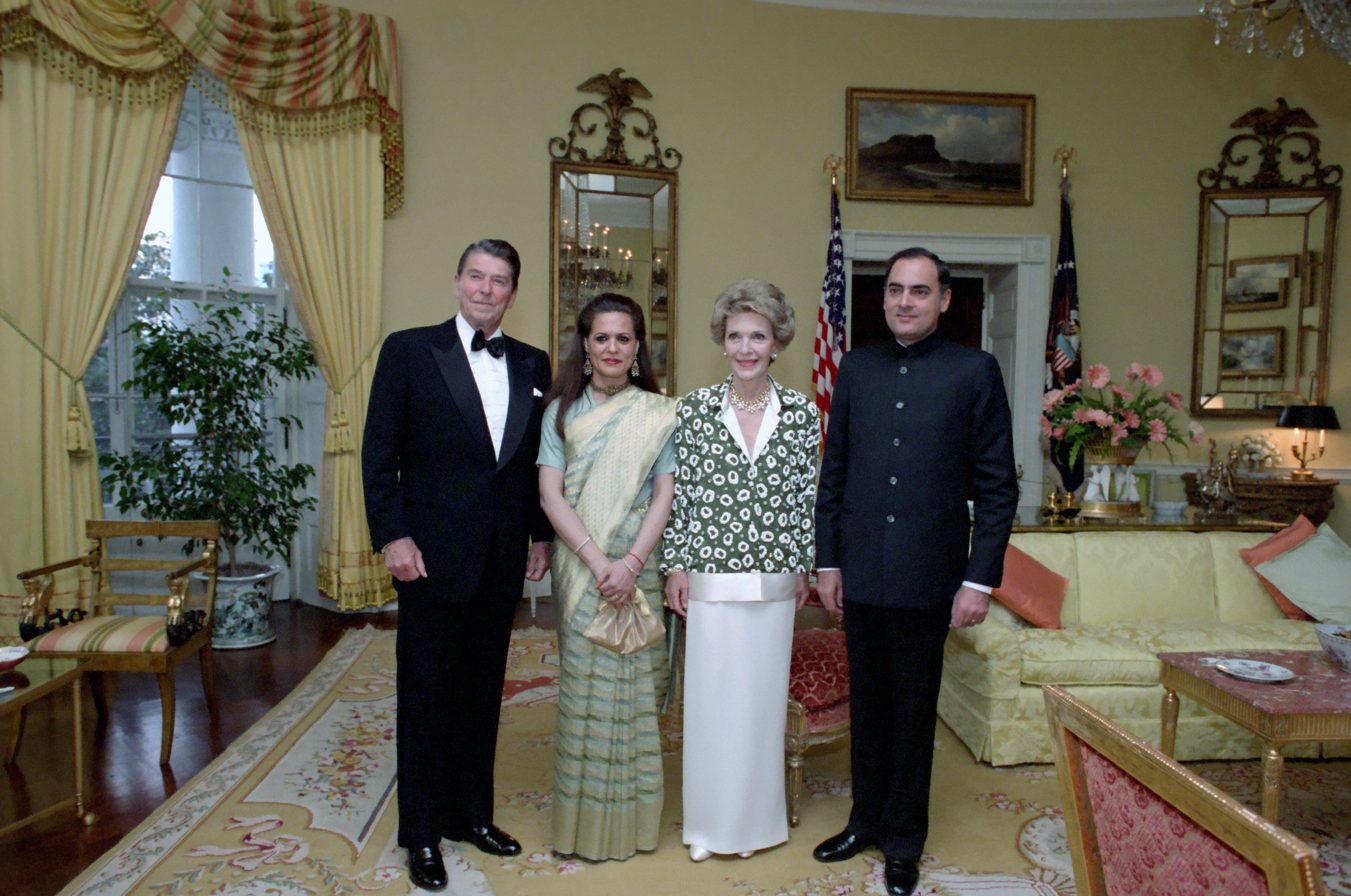
40th president of the United States Ronald Reagan, Sonia Gandhi, First Lady Nancy Reagan and Prime Minister Rajiv Gandhi, during a state dinner for Prime Minister Gandhi. June 1985

Gandhi's involvement with Indian public life began after the assassination of her mother-in-law and her husband's election as prime minister. As the prime minister's wife she acted as his official hostess and also accompanied him on a number of state visits.

In 1984, she actively campaigned against her husband's sister-in-law Maneka Gandhi who was running against Rajiv in Amethi. At the end of Rajiv Gandhi's five years in office, the Bofors scandal broke out. Ottavio Quattrocchi, an Italian businessman believed to be involved, was said to be a friend of Sonia Gandhi, having access to the Prime Minister's official residence. The BJP has alleged that she appeared on the voters' list in New Delhi prior to obtaining Indian citizenship in April 1983, in contravention of Indian law. Her party asserted that the documents presented by the BJP as proof of voter fraud were forged, due to their use of the term "National Capital Territory" which was not an official term until the 69th amendment to the Indian Constitution which took effect in 1992, 9 years after she gained Indian citizenship.

Former senior Congress leader and former President of India Pranab Mukherjee said that she surrendered her Italian passport to the Italian Embassy on 27 April 1983. Italian nationality law did not permit dual nationality until 1992. So, by acquiring Indian citizenship on 30 April 1983, she would automatically have lost Italian citizenship.

=== Political debut and Congress presidency (1991–1998) ===
After Rajiv Gandhi was assassinated in 1991 and Sonia Gandhi refused to succeed him as the prime minister and congress president, the party settled on the choice of P. V. Narasimha Rao who subsequently became Congress president and Prime Minister after winning elections that year. Over the next few years, however, the Congress fortunes continued to dwindle and it lost the 1996 elections. Several senior leaders such as Madhavrao Sindhia, Rajesh Pilot, Narayan Dutt Tiwari, Arjun Singh, Mamata Banerjee, G. K. Moopanar, P. Chidambaram and Jayanthi Natarajan were in open revolt against incumbent President Sitaram Kesri and many of them quit the party, splitting the Congress into many factions.

In an effort to revive the party's sagging fortunes, she joined the Congress Party as a primary member in the Calcutta Plenary Session in 1997 and became party leader in 1998.

In May 1999, three senior leaders of the party (Sharad Pawar, P. A. Sangma, and Tariq Anwar) challenged her right to try to become India's Prime Minister because of her foreign origins. In response, she offered to resign as party leader, resulting in an outpouring of support and the expulsion from the party of the three rebels who went on to form the Nationalist Congress Party.

Within 62 days of joining as a primary member, she was offered the party President post which she accepted.

She contested Lok Sabha elections from Bellary, Karnataka and Amethi, Uttar Pradesh in 1999. She won both seats but chose to represent Amethi. In Bellary, she had defeated veteran BJP leader, Sushma Swaraj.

=== Leader of the Opposition in the Lok Sabha (1999–2003) ===
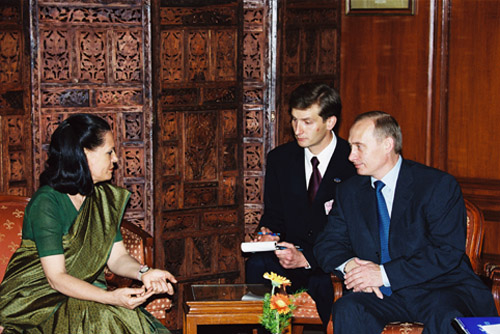
Sonia Gandhi as leader of opposition meeting with President of Russia Vladimir Putin in 2000.

She was elected the Leader of the Opposition of the 13th Lok Sabha in 1999.

When the BJP-led NDA formed a government under Atal Bihari Vajpayee, she took the office of the Leader of the Opposition. In 2000, she defeated Jitendra Prasada by a huge margin of 97% in the Congress President Election. She had been repeatedly selected for the position without any election being held. As Leader of the Opposition, she called a no-confidence motion against the NDA government led by Vajpayee in 2003.

=== Electoral success and NAC chairmanship (2004–2014) ===
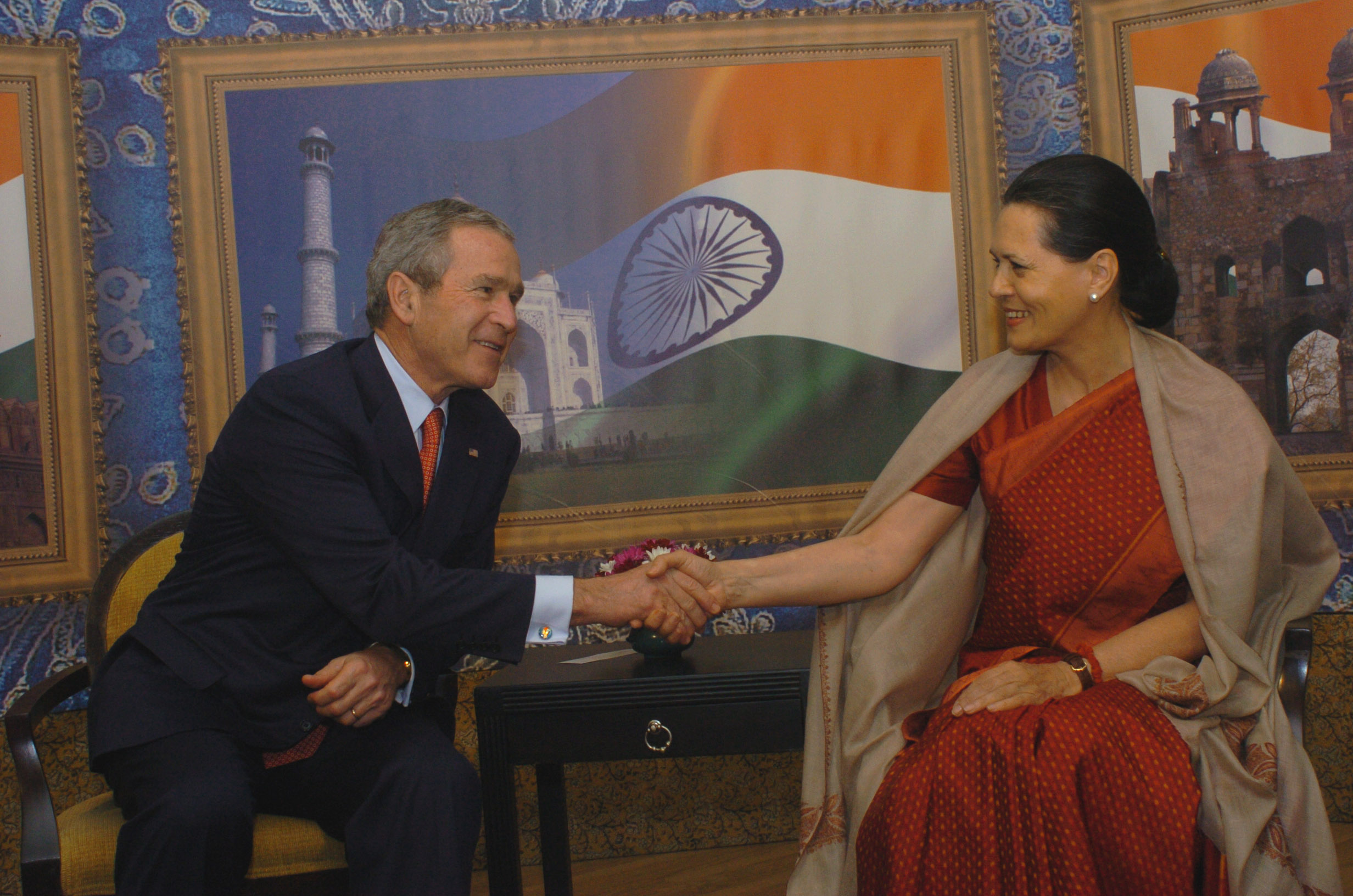
Sonia Gandhi as NAC Chair meeting with 43rd President of the United States George W. Bush in 2006

In the 2004 general elections, Gandhi launched a nationwide campaign, crisscrossing the country on the Aam Aadmi (ordinary man) slogan in contrast to the 'India Shining' slogan of the BJP-led National Democratic Alliance (NDA) alliance. She countered the BJP asking "Who is India Shining for?". In the election, she was re-elected by a 200,000-vote margin over her nearest rival, in the Rae Bareli constituency. Following the unexpected defeat of the NDA, she was widely expected to be the next Prime Minister of India. On 16 May, she was unanimously chosen to lead a coalition government of 15 parties supported by the left, and it was subsequently named as United Progressive Alliance (UPA).

The defeated NDA protested once again about her 'foreign origin' and senior NDA leader Sushma Swaraj threatened to shave her head and "sleep on the ground", among other things, should Sonia become prime minister. The NDA claimed that there were legal reasons that barred her from the Prime Minister's post. They pointed, in particular, to Section 5 of the Indian Citizenship Act of 1955, which they claimed implied 'reciprocity'. This was contested by others and eventually the suits were dismissed by the Supreme Court of India.

A few days after the election, Gandhi recommended Manmohan Singh as her choice as prime minister, which the party leaders accepted. Her supporters compared it to the old Indian tradition of renunciation, while her opponents attacked it as a political stunt.

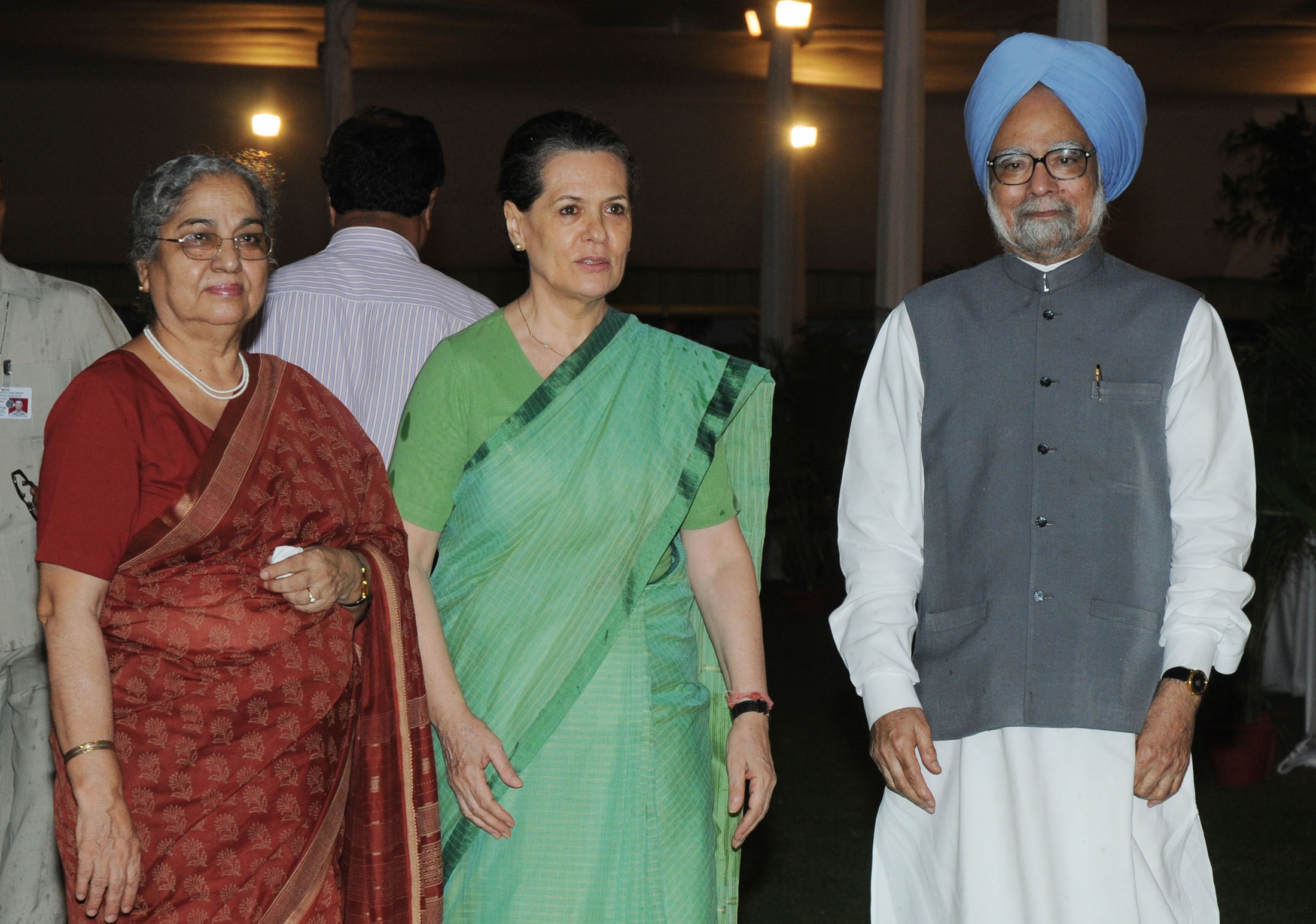
Sonia Gandhi with 13th Prime Minister of India Manmohan Singh and his wife Gursharan Kaur at an Iftar party in New Delhi in 2010

On 23 March 2006, Gandhi announced her resignation from the Lok Sabha and also as chairperson of the National Advisory Council under the office-of-profit controversy and the speculation that the government was planning to bring an ordinance to exempt the post of chairperson of National Advisory Council from the purview of office of profit. She was re-elected from her constituency Rae Bareli in May 2006 by a margin of over 400,000 votes.

As chairperson of the National Advisory Committee and the UPA, she played an important role in making the National Rural Employment Guarantee Scheme and the Right to Information Act into law.

She addressed the United Nations on 2 October 2007, Mahatma Gandhi's birth anniversary which is observed as the international day of non-violence after a UN resolution passed on 15 July 2007.

Under her leadership, the Congress-led UPA won a decisive majority in the 2009 general elections with Manmohan Singh as the Prime Minister. The Congress itself won 206 Lok Sabha seats, which was then the highest total by any party since 1991. She was re-elected to a third term as a member of parliament representing Rae Bareli.

In 2013, Gandhi became the first person to serve as Congress President for 15 years consecutively. In the same year, Gandhi condemned the Supreme Court judgement supporting Section 377 of the Indian Penal Code and backed LGBT rights.

=== Leaving active politics and Rajya Sabha (2014–present) ===
In the 2014 general election, she retained her seat in Rae Bareli. However, the Indian National Congress and the Congress-led UPA electoral alliance suffered their worst result in a general election ever, winning only 44 and 59 seats respectively. Her son, Rahul, took over as the party president on 16 December 2017.

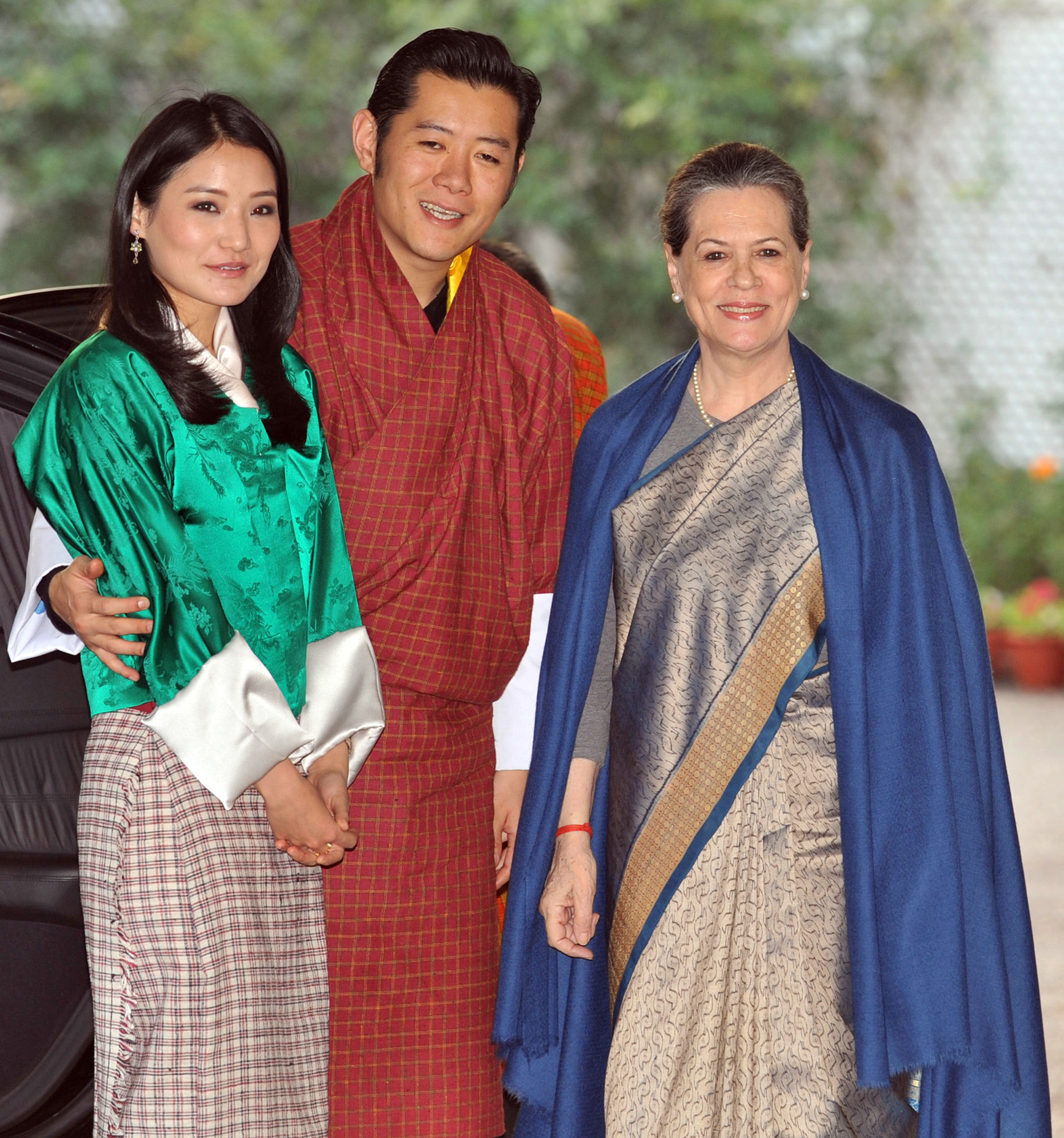
Sonia Gandhi with King of Bhutan Jigme Khesar Namgyel Wangchuck and Queen Jetsun Pema in 2014.

Gandhi returned to active politics for the Indian National Congress's campaign for the 2018 Karnataka Legislative Assembly election. Having stayed away from campaigning for elections since 2016, Gandhi addressed a rally at Bijapur, which comprised five legislative assembly constituencies; while Congress emerged as the second largest party in the election with 78 seats behind the BJP, the former won four or the five assembly seats from Bijapur. Gandhi also played an active role in orchestrating a post-poll alliance with the Janata Dal (Secular).

Rahul Gandhi, taking responsibility for Congress party's second consecutive loss in general elections held in 2019, resigned from the post of President on 25 May. Following the resignation, party leaders began deliberations for a suitable candidate to replace him. The Congress Working Committee met on 10 August to take a final call on the matter. It passed a resolution asking Sonia Gandhi to take over as interim president until a consensus candidate could be selected.

Following her appointment, Gandhi undertook a restructuring of the Congress' state units and appointed Kumari Selja and Eknath Gaikwad as the presidents of the party's Haryana and Mumbai units. Several other changes were also made in the party's organisational units in states slated for elections including Haryana, Maharashtra, and Jharkhand.

In February 2020, Gandhi held a press conference where she demanded that Home Minister Amit Shah should resign for failing to stop the North East Delhi riots. She asked for the deployment of an adequate number of security forces. In 2022, it was reported that Sonia Gandhi supported Rajasthan CM Ashok Gehlot for Congress president to lead in the next Indian general election. But, Gehlot did not contest the election and Gandhi loyalist Mallikarjun Kharge elected as the new Congress president, defeating non-loyalist Shashi Tharoor.

In February 2024, Gandhi opted out of the 2024 Indian general election, citing health and age-related issues. Gandhi filed her nomination to contest for the 2024 Rajya Sabha elections from Rajasthan to succeed retiring MP Manmohan Singh. During the nomination filing, she was accompanied by Rahul Gandhi, Ashok Gehlot and other senior members of the party. She was elected unopposed to the Rajya Sabha from Rajasthan on 20 February 2024 and took the oath in April.

On 15 April 2025, the Enforcement Directorate filed a chargesheet against her in connection with the National Herald case.

In September 2025, she criticised the friendly relationship between Indian Prime Minister Narendra Modi and Israeli Prime Minister Benjamin Netanyahu, and the Indian government's silence on the genocide in Gaza. On 27 June 2026, Gandhi stated that the government's "stony silence" and "inaction" of the genocide in Gaza was "morally reprehensible but also inexplicable from a national interest perspective".

Gandhi told The Guardian in November 2026, prior to the release of her memoir Belonging: A Journey of Love, that the 1975–1977 Emergency was a "mistake," adding that Indira Gandhi was "never comfortable" with the decision and eventually came to regret it. She added in the book that "keeping Sanjay in check could have prevented much of the damage that followed."

== Personal life ==
Sonia is the widow of Rajiv Gandhi, elder son of Indira Gandhi. She has two children, Rahul Gandhi and Priyanka Gandhi, who both serve as Members of Parliament in the Lok Sabha.

In August 2011, she underwent successful surgery for cervical cancer in the United States at Memorial Sloan–Kettering Cancer Center in New York. She returned to India on 9 September after her treatment.

According to an affidavit filed during the 2014 Indian general election, Gandhi had declared assets worth ₹9.28 crore (US$1.52 million), with ₹2.81 crore (US$460,000) in movable and ₹6.47 crore (US$1.06 million) in immovable properties. This was an almost six-fold increase since her declaration in the last election in 2009; party officials attributed this to a switch from book value to market value for asset valuation.

Gandhi's mother, Paola Maino, died due to an illness at her home in Italy on 27 August 2022, at the age of about 90.

Lately Gandhi has suffered from chronic bronchial asthma and periodic respiratory tract infections, sometimes leading to hospitalisation.

A memoir on her life titled Belonging: A Journey of Love was released worldwide on 10 November 2026.

== Electoral history ==
Year	Election	Party	Constituency Name	Result	Votes gained	Vote share%
1999	13th Lok Sabha	INC	Amethi	Won	4,18,960	67.12%
1999	13th Lok Sabha	INC	Bellary	Won	4,14,650	51.70%
2004	14th Lok Sabha	INC	Rae Bareli	Won	378,107	58.75%
2006	14th Lok Sabha	INC	Rae Bareli	Won	4,74,891	80.49%
2009	15th Lok Sabha	INC	Rae Bareli	Won	4,81,490	72.23%
2014	16th Lok Sabha	INC	Rae Bareli	Won	5,26,434	63.80%
2019	17th Lok Sabha	INC	Rae Bareli	Won	5,34,918	55.80%

== Honours and recognition ==
Gandhi was seen as the most powerful politician of India from 2004 to 2014, and variously listed among the most powerful people and women listings by magazines.

In 2013, Sonia Gandhi was ranked 21st among world's most powerful and 9th most powerful woman by Forbes Magazine.

In 2007, she was named the third most powerful woman in the world by the same magazine and was ranked 6th in exclusive list in 2007.

In 2010, Gandhi was ranked as the ninth most powerful person on the planet by Forbes magazine. She was ranked 12 in 2012 in Forbes' powerful people list.

Sonia was also named among the Time 100 most influential people in the world for 2007 and 2008. New Statesman listed Sonia Gandhi at number 29 in their annual survey of "The World's 50 Most Influential Figures" in 2010.

Year	Name	Awarding organisation	Ref.
2008	Honorary Doctorate (Literature)	University of Madras	
2006	Order of King Leopold, Grand Officer	Government of Belgium	
2006	Honorary Doctorate	Vrije Universiteit Brussel (Brussels University)	

== See also ==
- Political families of India

Party political offices
Preceded by Sitaram Kesri	President of the Indian National Congress; 1998–2017	Succeeded by Rahul Gandhi
Preceded by Rahul Gandhi	President of the Indian National Congress; 2019–2022	Succeeded by Mallikarjun Kharge
New office	Chairperson of the United Progressive Alliance; 2004–2023	Succeeded by Office abolished
Rajya Sabha
Preceded by Manmohan Singh	Member of Parliament for Rajasthan; 2024–present	Incumbent
Lok Sabha
Preceded by Sanjay Singh	Member of Parliament for Amethi; 1999–2004	Succeeded by Rahul Gandhi
Preceded by Satish Sharma	Member of Parliament for Rae Bareli; 2004–2024	Succeeded by Rahul Gandhi
Political offices
Preceded by Sharad Pawar	Leader of the Opposition; 1998–2004	Succeeded by Lal Krishna Advani
