= Belonging: A Journey of Love =

2026 memoir by Sonia Gandhi

- Author: Sonia Gandhi
- Language: English
- Genre: Memoir
- Publisher: HarperCollins India
- Publication date: 10 November 2026

Belonging: A Journey of Love is a memoir by the Indian politician and parliamentarian Sonia Gandhi, published on 10 November 2026. It recounts roughly 60 years of Sonia's life in chronological order, from her childhood in Veneto, Italy, to the contemporary politics of India, covering the tragedies, controversies and personal struggles of her private and public life. Journalists have described Belonging as a personal autobiography that uses politics as a narrative backdrop.

Gandhi first expressed her intention to write a memoir in 2014. She then wrote Belonging: A Journey of Love over the next decade, rewriting it several times. The Indian edition of the memoir was published by HarperCollins India, while William Collins published the UK edition. The US and global editions were published by Alfred A. Knopf. Gandhi had originally partnered with Penguin Random House India to publish the memoir, but the deal collapsed after the publishing house, according to Gandhi, was uncomfortable with her criticisms of the Bharatiya Janata Party (BJP), the Rashtriya Swayamsevak Sangh (RSS), and the Prime Minister Narendra Modi in the material and asked her to edit the contentious passages. Penguin denied Gandhi's claims and maintained that they only proposed a fact-checking revision of the book. Gandhi debuted on social media platforms on 22 October 2026 to announce the release of the book.

The memoir narrates a number of personal, anecdotal, and controversial topics from Gandhi's life. She describes meeting her husband Rajiv and her marriage to him, migrating to India, adapting to its culture and the Nehru–Gandhi family, her relationship with mother-in-law Indira, the family's inner turmoils, the Emergency, the death of her brother-in-law Sanjay, the assassination of Indira, Rajiv's 1984 electoral victory and assassination, and the upbringing of her children Rahul and Priyanka. She also discusses the rise of the BJP and the RSS, assuming leadership of the Indian National Congress (INC), the party's 2004 and 2009 victories, choosing Manmohan Singh for Prime Minister over herself, her personal upheavals including her cancer, and her criticism of the Modi administration. Photographs from Gandhi's life are interspersed throughout the memoir.

Upon release, Belonging: A Journey of Love generated strong physical sales from across bookstores in Delhi, Mumbai, Kolkata, Chennai, Bengaluru, Hyderabad, and other major cities of India. The book also topped the Amazon India Biographies list. Reviewers praised the book's revelations, candid writing, and its balance between personal and politically charged material, but noted Gandhi's restraint in examining the INC's flaws. Members of the BJP claimed that Gandhi had sanitized the actions of the Nehru–Gandhi family in the book, while members of the INC defended it, citing her right to tell her own story and express her perspectives. Indian media outlets have highlighted a range of discrepancies, including factual and numerical errors, in the memoir.

== Background ==
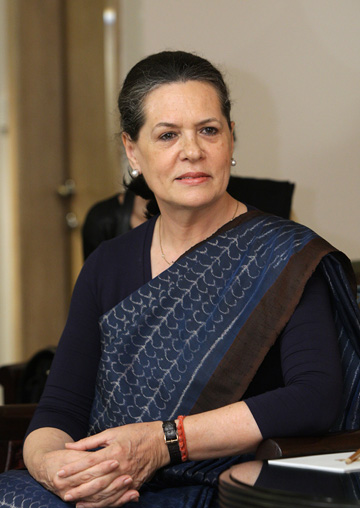
Sonia Gandhi (pictured) in 2010 during a meeting with Russian president Vladimir Putin

Sonia Gandhi is an Indian politician, originally from Italy. She was the president of the Indian National Congress (INC), the ruling party of the Government of India for most of its post-independence history, from 1998 to 2017 and 2019 to 2022. Her husband Rajiv Gandhi and mother-in-law Indira Gandhi served as Prime Ministers of India. As of November 2026, her son Rahul Gandhi and daughter Priyanka Gandhi are Members of Parliament from the Lok Sabha, with Rahul as the Leader of the Opposition since 2024. Sonia Gandhi retired from active politics and has served as a Member of Parliament from the Rajya Sabha, representing Rajasthan since 2024. Throughout her political career, Gandhi's "guarded privacy" has been a recurring subject of discussion among the public, the media and political forums. The National Herald wrote that Gandhi had maintained that privacy "remarkably, for decades".

On 31 July 2014, Gandhi signaled she was writing a book when she spoke to NDTV in response to claims made in Indian politician Natwar Singh's memoir One Life Is Not Enough, saying "the only way the truth will come out is if I write. I am serious about this." Gandhi then spent over a decade writing and rewriting the manuscript with frequent breaks. Rather than writing a strictly political tell-all, Gandhi chose to write a book that would tell her personal story of her love for Rajiv and Indira and her adopted home in India, using politics mainly as a narrative backdrop. Writing in The Hindu ahead of the memoir's release in India, Gandhi said "much has been written about my family, but rarely with real insight into who they were, their motivations, their struggles, their very human flaws. I wanted to portray them honestly, as people I knew and loved."

== Photography ==
The front cover of Belonging: A Journey of Love features a black-and-white portrait of Sonia Gandhi, taken by Rajiv in Turin, Italy, in 1966, when he visited Italy to ask her father's permission to marry her; Gandhi was 20 years old at the time of the photograph. The back cover features a portrait of Gandhi taken in Delhi in 2026 by her grandson, Raihan Vadra, and his fiancée Aviva Baig. The Indian Express noted that the front and back covers are separated by 60 years and 6,000 km. The memoir contains photographs and snapshots interspersed throughout the prose.

== Publishing and release ==
Penguin Random House India was initially involved in discussions to publish the memoir in India. The proposed arrangement did not proceed following a disagreement between the publisher and Gandhi. Reports by The Indian Express attributed the disagreement to proposed editorial changes to the manuscript. According to allegations covered The Hindu, the deal collapsed following "an editorial deadlock and legal review disputes over specific manuscript passages—reportedly involving references to Prime Minister Narendra Modi, the RSS, and China". Penguin disputed reports that it had withdrawn because Gandhi had rejected editorial changes. The publisher said it had remained willing to publish the book but that discussions had reached an impasse over a particular issue. It also said that fact-checking and editorial recommendations were part of its normal publishing process. HarperCollins India subsequently said that it would publish the Indian edition, while its British imprint William Collins would publish the UK edition. The US and international editions will be published by Alfred A. Knopf.

To promote Belonging: A Journey of Love, Gandhi made her official debut on Instagram, Facebook, and X, and posted a video alongside Priyanka in which she showed the first physical copies of the book, and said that it would be available for purchase across all bookstores of India. Gandhi was interviewed by publications including The Hindu and The Guardian, where she explained "her desire to tell her own story after decades of others writing her narrative." She also wrote an introductory essay about the memoir in The Hindu on 7 November 2026. Gandhi told The Guardian that Penguin was "uneasy in general with the criticism of the government" and dropped the book after she refused edits. Gandhi also appeared on the cover of Harper's Bazaar India, styled by Priyanka and photographed by Raihan Vadra.

== Synopsis ==
Belonging: A Journey of Love consists of 544 pages, chronologically grouped into seven sections that trace roughly six decades of Gandhi's life. The first 100 pages cover her early life and marriage: her childhood in a post-war Veneto, Italy, meeting Rajiv in Cambridge, England, in 1965, and her adjustment to life in India after marrying Rajiv and moving to Delhi in 1968, learning to speak Hindi, and acclimatizing herself to Indian cuisine and clothing. Gandhi wrote about the difficulties she faced in her early days as part of the Nehru–Gandhi family, especially with Indira, and the strained relationship with her own father in Italy.

The middle sections detail the birth and childhood of Rahul and Priyanka, and the tragedies Gandhi experienced, such as the death of her brother-in-law Sanjay (1980), and the assassination of Indira in 1984, and subsequently Rajiv in 1991. She revisited the Emergency era (1975–1977) and Operation Blue Star (1984), detailing their impact on her family and the nation. Gandhi further commented on the demolition of the Babri Masjid (1992), as well as the rise of the Bharatiya Janata Party (BJP) and its associate, the Hindutva paramilitary organization Rashtriya Swayamsevak Sangh (RSS). She described how the INC's circumstances, as it lost electoral ground and faced defections and factionalism, led to her entry into politics in 1997 as the party's president, despite her parents' advice to return to Italy, and how her private Bhagavad Gita lessons with a Sanskrit scholar helped her step into the role.

The final portion of the book covers the United Progressive Alliance (UPA) era of India, addressing the INC's victory in the 2004 general election under her lead, her decision to decline the Prime Minister position offered by her party and instead choose the economist Manmohan Singh for the post, as well as allegations of backseat-driving Singh's government. Gandhi also wrote about the loss of her first child in 1969. The book covers topics such as her fallout with her sister-in-law Maneka, the ambitions of her peer Pranabh Mukherjee, her breast and pancreatic cancer from 2010 to 2011, and anecdotes about foreign dignitaries such as Vladimir Putin, Nicolas Sarkozy, Bill Clinton, Prince Edward, and Princess Margaret. She criticised the government headed by Narendra Modi of the BJP since 2014 and its policies, alleging that it undemocratically toppled the INC's state governments and promoted the RSS's plans for India. Gandhi also commented on the 2016 banknote demonetisation, the GST (2017), the 2019 Pulwama attack, and the Chinese border incursions under Modi's administration.

== Reception ==
=== Sales ===
Booksellers and distributors across India reported heavy demand and rapid initial sales of the memoir. Most physical bookstores surveyed across major Indian cities reported that up to 70 percent of their total sales in the first two days came from Belonging: A Journey of Love. The book topped the Biographies & Autobiographies bestseller list on Amazon India on its release day, driven by high sales and pre-orders that had been open since September 2026. According to the Business Standard, the Indian publishing industry personnel, bookstore owners, and e-commerce platforms were "unanimous that they could not recall the last time a memoir had generated such interest." The book was also available on Blinkit in some places.

In Delhi, bookstores came "alive with crowds of readers", according to the Business Standard. Abhinav Bamhi, fourth-generation owner of Faqir Chand Bookstore in New Delhi's Khan Market, said that he could not recall such demand since Harry Potter and the Deathly Hallows (2007). At Bahrisons Booksellers, people queued outside the shop, with several taking pictures with the book and posting them on social media. In Mumbai, bookstores such as Kitabkhana, Crossword and White Crow saw heavy activity from the morning of 10 November. In Bengaluru, major bookstores, particularly those in Church Street, Vijayanagar and Indiranagar, saw large crowds. In Kolkata, the book drew interest among young readers, including at the historic shops of College Street and the Oxford Bookstore. The National Herald reported strong interest in pre-bookings among young corporate professionals and college students. In Hyderabad, many bookstores were close to selling out, with strong interest before the launch among the city's youth, particularly IT professionals. Many Hyderabad and Chennai stores were "flooded" with calls about the book.

=== Critical reviews ===
Vir Sanghvi of ThePrint commended the memoir's balance between personal and political topics; he praised Gandhi's candid and vulnerable writing, and the layered but "restrained" critique of Modi, BJP, and RSS. Dharvi Vaid Dhulia, writing for the German outlet Deustche Welle, wrote that the memoir "sheds light" on the inner dynamics of the Nehru–Gandhi family. Rajdeep Sardesai of India Today called Belonging an "extraordinary" story rich with poignance and emotional honesty, but said that it "may appear trapped in political correctness" to her staunch critics. In contrast, Puneet Nicholas Yadav of The Federal wrote that the memoir is "less a political reckoning than an intensely personal act of remembrance" and may frustrate readers looking for revelations about the Congress, its internal power struggles or the political history Sonia helped shape."

Sidharth Bhatia of The Wire praised Gandhi's emotional honesty and candid storytelling but emphasized the book's errors and omissions as poor editing. Nagendra of National Herald said that the book "combines political intrigue with human emotion". N. Ram of The Hindu also praised the book's use of politics as a framework to tell Gandhi's story. The same newspaper's Sandeep Phukan criticized the memoir's "reticence" in scrutinizing the INC's shortcomings, but complimented the revelatory subject matter and Gandhi's "striking candour". Soutik Biswas of the British outlet BBC wrote that the memoir is not particularly neutral, as it "largely sidesteps the culture of patronage, cronyism and corruption that dogged Congress during its years in power", but praised Gandhi's "searing" writing and melancholic narration.

=== Political reaction ===
The BJP accused Gandhi of "whitewashing" and "sugar-coating historical wrongs perpetrated by the Nehru–Gandhi family". Harsimrat Kaur Badal, a Member of Parliament of Shiromani Akali Dal (SAD), criticized Gandhi for not apologizing for the 1984 anti-Sikh riots that followed Indira's assassination, describing the incident as a "passing mention" in the memoir.

Members of the INC have defended the book, citing Gandhi's right to express her "personal" story and accusing the BJP of attempting to give the book a communal spin. The Chief Minister of Keralam, V. D. Satheesan, said that Gandhi's "memories and convictions hold significance at a time when India's secular traditions and constitutional values face serious challenges." The Chief Minister of Karnataka, D. K. Shivakumar, described the book as "a story of love, loss, resilience and belonging" and as the experiences of a woman "who made India her home and embraced a life shaped by personal convictions and public responsibility". The Chief Minister of Tamil Nadu, C. Joseph Vijay, attended Gandhi's book launch event in Delhi. Members of the INC from Telangana announced plans to fund a biopic of Gandhi adapted from the memoir.

=== Inaccuracies and discrepancies ===
Following its release, Belonging: A Journey of Love drew media scrutiny over factual and historical errors. Alongside disputed political interpretations of events such as the Kargil War and the 2014 general election, reviewers documented errors involving dates, names and constitutional provisions. India Today identified 55 factual and contextual discrepancies across the text. Commentators linked the factual lapses to the book's pre-publication history. Prior to its release by HarperCollins India, the manuscript was contracted to Penguin Random House India which withdrew from the project in August 2026 following disagreements with Gandhi's representatives over proposed legal edits, deletions and fact-checking revisions. Errors highlighted by media outlets are as follows:

- The opening chapters recalls a January encounter stating that Sonia Gandhi was 19 and Rajiv was 21 when they met in Cambridge before June 1965. Born in December 1946 and August 1944 respectively, they would have been 18 and 20 in early 1965.
- The book states that Sonia Gandhi's longtime political secretary, Ahmed Patel, died of COVID-19 in 2022. He died on 25 November 2020.
- The book claims the RSS was founded in 1921. Historical records show it was founded four years later, on 27 September 1925.
- Gandhi writes that Anna Hazare emerged as the figurehead of the India Against Corruption movement in 2012. The nationwide protests and Hazare's Jantar Mantar hunger strike occurred in 2011.
- When explaining India's parliamentary system, Gandhi states that Lok Sabha members are elected while Rajya Sabha members are nominated. Under the Constitution, 238 Rajya Sabha MPs are indirectly elected by state legislatures and 12 are nominated by the President.
- In recalling Nelson Mandela's 1994 inauguration, the text refers to then Vice-President K. R. Narayanan as "President RK Narayan" (the Indian novelist).
- The book states that Prime Minister Atal Bihari Vajpayee was being hosted by Nawaz Sharif in Islamabad at the exact time shepherd Tashi Namgyal spotted Pakistani infiltrators. Vajpayee visited Lahore in February 1999, while the infiltrators were spotted in May 1999. The book also states that Indian forces recaptured the peaks over 10 months, whereas the conflict concluded in July 1999 after roughly two months.
- While recounting the 2002 Gujarat violence, the memoir states that four coaches of the Sabarmati Express were set ablaze at Godhra. Official records confirm the fatal fire involved only coach S-6.
- In the same section on 2002, the book refers to Ahmedabad as the capital of Gujarat. Gandhinagar has served as the state's capital since 1970.
- While correctly noting that the BJP won 282 seats in the 2014 Lok Sabha election, the book mentions the National Democratic Alliance's (NDA) combined tally as 353 seats. The NDA won 336 seats in 2014, whereas 353 was its tally in the 2019 general election.
- The book contradicts itself across chapters regarding the INC's 1984 Lok Sabha victory, citing 405 seats in one passage and 404 seats in another.
- Gandhi writes that the Supreme Court's 2001 ruling simply upheld Rajiv's 1986 Muslim Women (Protection of Rights on Divorce) Act 1986, omitting the court's qualification requiring a fair provision for divorced women extending beyond the iddat period.
- Gandhi dates Mandela's visit to India to receive the Bharat Ratna to 1991. The visit took place in October 1990.
- The 1985 Commonwealth Heads of Government Meeting (CHOGM) in Nassau is described as the 49th summit. In reality, it was the eighth.
- The book refers to Deng Xiaoping as China's president. Yang Shangkun held the presidency at that time, while Deng was China's paramount leader and Chairman of the Central Military Commission.
- The book makes four legal and timeline errors regarding Rahul Gandhi's 2023 criminal defamation case:
  - It claims the case was filed in 2023 over remarks made three years earlier; the remarks and complaint both occurred in April 2019.
  - It states the Gujarat High Court sentenced him to two years in prison; a Surat magistrate's court delivered the sentence on 23 March 2023.
  - It says he returned to Parliament a year later; his Lok Sabha membership was restored on 7 August 2023, less than five months after his disqualification.
  - It states the Supreme Court suspended his prison sentence; the court stayed his conviction on 4 August 2023.
