= Paul DiCocco Sr. =

American mobster

Paul "Legs" DiCocco Sr. (June 20, 1924 – July 30, 1989) was an Italian Upstate New York reputed racketeer and associate of mobster Carmine Galante who was involved in illegal gambling and also owned restaurants and construction companies.

A longtime gambler with numerous minor convictions for illegal gambling, DiCocco was connected to New York's underworld. He also controlled racketeering and other criminal activities with Carmine Galante in Montreal, Canada.

DiCocco also had contacts in New York's labor unions; he and Nicholas Robilotto, President of Teamsters Local #294 in Albany, New York were eventually investigated for conspiring to underbid rival construction companies. DiCocco owned a luncheonette with his brother that was renowned for its Italian cuisine.

In 1951, DiCocco was investigated by a grand jury on charges of corruption and illegal gambling in Schenectady County, New York. This investigation resulted from allegations that Schenectady Police Chief Joseph A. Peters fixed a traffic ticket for DiCocco. Peters denied the charge but was eventually forced to resign.

Receiving a subpoena from Mayor Samuel S. Stratton, DiCocco appeared before a City Hall investigation on his supposed ties to organized crime. During a half-hour period, DiCocco pleaded the Fourth and Fifth Amendment to the United States Constitutions to the U.S. Constitution over 76 times.

In 1977, DiCocco was indicted on contempt and perjury charges. Shortly after his first trial ended in a hung jury, DiCocco accepted a plea bargain to obstructing governmental administration and contempt. DiCocco received three years probation and a $1,000 fine.

He is related to the DiCocco, Tessitore, Iovinella, Cuomo and Viscusi families.

In 1988, DiCocco was released from probation due to bad health.

On July 30, 1989, DiCocco died from complications from a previous heart transplant at the age of 65. His funeral procession was extremely well-attended and the family received over a hundred floral arrangements, despite requesting donations to a heart transplant fund instead.
