= Paul-Heinrich Lange =

German sailor

Paul-Heinrich Lange (12 October 1908 – 14 July 1989) was a German sailor who competed in the 1952 Summer Olympics.
