= Shinnyo-en =

Japanese Buddhist new religious movement

- 真如苑
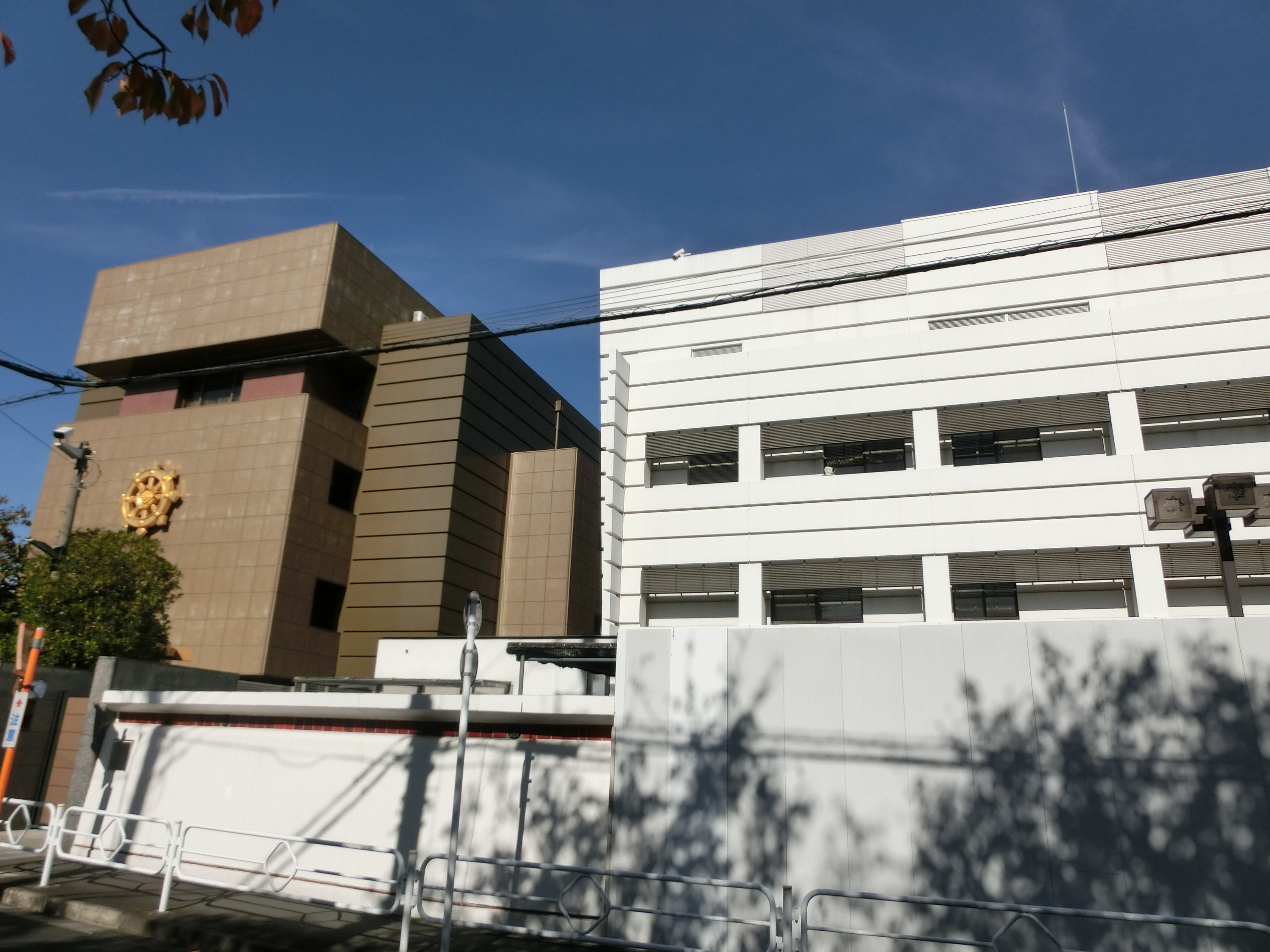
- Shinnyo-en Headquarters in Tachikawa, Tokyo, Japan
- Formation: 1936
- Founders: Shinjō Itō and Tomoji Itō
- Founded at: Tachikawa
- Members: 902,254 (2012)
- Head Priest: Shinsō Itō
- Affiliations: Shingon Buddhism
- Website: www.shinnyoen.org

Shinnyo-en (真如苑, Garden of Tathātā) is a modern global Buddhist School for lay people. Its traditions can be traced back to the Daigoji branch of Shingon Buddhism. It was founded in 1936 by Shinjō Itō and his wife Tomoji (友司; 1912–1967) in a suburb of metropolitan Tokyo, the city of Tachikawa, where its headquarters is still located.

The temples are characterised by the Nirvana image, a statue of the reclining Buddha. Central to Shinnyo-en is the belief, expressed in the Mahāyāna Mahāparinirvāṇa Sūtra, that all beings possess Buddha-nature, a natural, unfettered purity that can respond creatively and compassionately to any situation in life.

As of 1989 the head of Shinnyo-en was Shinsō Itō (born 1942, also known as 'Keishu'), who holds the rank of Daisōjō, the highest rank in traditional Shingon Buddhism.

== History ==
Shinnyo-en was established in 1936 by Shinjō Itō and his wife Tomoji in the Tokyo suburb of Tachikawa. In December 1935, Shinjō Itō and Tomoji Itō had enshrined an image of Acala believed to have been sculpted by the renowned Buddhist sculptor Unkei and they began a 30-day period of winter austerities in early 1936. Tomoji cultivated her spiritual faculty (霊能, reinō) on February 4, inheriting it from her aunt.

In May 1936, Shinjō Itō was ordained by Daisōjō and Chief Abbot Egen Saeki at Sanbō-in, a temple of the Daigo school of Shingon Buddhism. The Chief Abbot conferred to him the monastic name of Shinjō, meaning "True Vehicle", and the title of Kongō-in, which means "Vajra", in December 1938. Accordingly, he changed his name from Fumiaki Itō to Shinjō Itō in April 1942.

The community was first named Risshō-kaku, then the Tachikawa Fellowship of Achala (Tachikawa Fudoson Kyokai, 1938–1948). Formally registered in 1948 under the Religious Corporations Ordinance (Japanese: Shukyo Hojinrei, enacted in 1945) the name changed to Sangha of Truth (Makoto-Kyodan) with Shinchō-ji as its Head Temple.

In 1950, a high-ranking disciple who worked in the temple office filed formal charges against Shinjō. He claimed he had been beaten during one of the sesshin trainings. Shinjō Itō maintained that he was only trying to suppress the disciple's physical convulsions during the session. Itō was arrested on 20 August 1950, and the trial for the case lasted until March 1956, when he was sentenced to seven months imprisonment and three years of probation.

The sangha was permitted to continue, but under a different name. It was reorganized and renamed Shinnyo-en on June 21, 1951, and Tomoji Itō became its administrative head. After the revision of the Japanese Religious Corporation Act in April 1951, Shinnyo-en filed an application in the following year and received approval from the Minister of Education on May 16, 1953.

The first image of the reclining Nirvana Buddha, sculpted by Shinjō Itō, was consecrated on November 3, 1957.

Wat Paknam Bhasicharoen, a Thai Buddhist temple, presented Shinnyo-en with śarīra (sacred relics of Lord Buddha) on July 30, 1966.

The first Shinnyo-en Sanctuary outside Japan was inaugurated on March 2, 1971 in Mililani, Hawaii, followed by the dedication of temples in Honolulu (1973), San Francisco (1982), Taiwan (1985), France (1985), Los Angeles (1990), Italy (1990), Belgium (1991), Hong Kong (1992), U.K. (1994), Germany (1994), Singapore (1994), and Australia (1999).

== Teachings ==
The principal sutras on which the Shinnyo teachings are based are the Prajñāpāramitā Sutra, the Lotus Sutra and the Mahāyāna Mahāparinirvāṇa Sūtra. According to Shinnyo-en, the Mahāparinirvāṇa Sutra teaches four key points:

1. Buddhahood is always present
2. All beings possess a Buddha-nature
3. There is hope for everyone to attain nirvana
4. Nirvana is of the present moment and characterized by permanence-bliss-self-purity.

Junna Nakata, the 103rd Head Priest of Daigoji Monastery of the Shingon School, describes the teaching as follows:

If we view the Buddhist tradition as a vertical line, and the world we live in as a horizontal line, Shinjō Itō placed the teachings of Nirvana to work as a link between the two, and proved the validity of the Nirvana teachings.

The teachings integrate elements of traditional Theravada, Mahayana and Vajrayana Buddhism, cultural influences characteristic to Japanese Buddhism, as well as practices and rituals initiated by Shinjo Ito, the founder of Shinnyo-en.

== Organizational structure ==
The Shinnyo-en sangha is organised into “lineages" (Japanese: suji), which consists of a group of members mentored by a "lineage parent" (Japanese: sujioya). Practitioners usually gather at the temple and training centre for prayer, meditation and training, and, if they so wish, also at home meetings. The sangha as a whole encourages and participates in volunteer activities in the spirit of Buddhist practice.

The leadership in Shinnyo-en follows the Buddhist tradition of Dharma succession from master to disciple:

In Daigo-ji there are two Dharma streams (lineages)—that of lay Buddhism (Ein) and that of monastic Buddhism (Diamond and Womb Worlds). Shinjō Itō succeeded to both from the 96th Dharma-successor and Chief Abbot of Daigo-ji, Egen Saeki. [...] I believe Kyoshu-sama had the intention of merging the two Dharma-streams from the beginning. By doing so, he gave rise to a new Dharma-stream. For Daigoji as well as for the whole of the religious world, the Shinnyo Dharma-stream, which unites the Buddhist tradition and society, is the Dharma-stream in its ideal form.

In 1982, Shinsō Itō (born 1942 as Masako Itō), the third daughter of Shinjō and Tomoji, completed her Buddhist training. Shinjō announced her to become his successor in 1983 and gave her the priestly name 'Shinsō'. After Shinjō's passing on July 19, 1989 Shinsō Itō becomes the head of Shinnyo-en. In 1992, Shinsō Itō was conferred Daisōjo, the highest priestly rank in traditional Shingon Buddhism, by the Daigo-ji Shingon Buddhist monastery. She also received an honorary doctorate from Mahachulalongkornrajavidyalaya University in Thailand in 2002 for her long-standing efforts to foster relations with Theravada Buddhism.

In Shinnyo-en's Dharma School (Japanese: Chiryu-Gakuin) members study Buddhist doctrine and learn ritualistic aspects. After graduating as a Dharma Teacher they can further qualify for undergoing Buddhist ordination (Japanese: Tokudo-Jukai) and receiving traditional monastic ranks.

== Social action ==
Shinnyo-en believes an individual's action can contribute to creating a harmonious society. Working towards this goal, the organization engages in interfaith dialogue, environmental activities, and disaster relief. Shinnyo-en also supports organizations such as Médecins sans Frontières (Doctors Without Borders), the Red Cross Society, and the World Wildlife Fund.

In an interview conducted by the Tricycle magazine, Shinso Ito stated:

People who are interested in traditional Buddhist training are always welcome, but volunteer activities provide an additional avenue for Shinnyo-en to contribute to the wider secular community. (Shinso Ito)

Shinnyo-en also operates the Hanzomon Museum in Tokyo.

== Shinnyo practice ==
Shinnyo-en practitioners are encouraged to practice sesshin training and undertake the Three Practices (三つの歩み, mittsu no ayumi), which are a distillation of the six Pāramitā taught by Shakyamuni Buddha.

=== Three Practices ===
The Three Practices (三つの歩み, mittsu no ayumi) are:

1. Joyful donations (歓喜, kangi; small monetary contribution to the organization)
2. Sharing the Teachings (お救け, otasuke)
3. Giving time and service (ご奉仕, gohōshi).

Concretely, this means abiding by the principles of the Teachings, participating in volunteer activities, and donating small sums of money.

=== Sesshin ===
Sesshin (the word is composed of the two Chinese characters, "touch" and "heart") is the central element of spiritual practice for Shinnyo practitioners. This is not to be confused with the sesshin in Zen Buddhism. Whereas in Zen Buddhism, sesshin refers to a period of intensive meditation, with many hours of meditation each day, sesshin in Shinnyo-en has an entirely different meaning.

A sesshin involves receiving guidance from a 'Spiritual guide' (霊能者, reinōsha; medium), a person who has been specially trained and cultivated the Shinnyo spiritual faculty (霊能, reinō'). Sesshin lasts for about three minutes per person, and in most cases, takes place at a Shinnyo-en temple. Its purpose is to enable participants to identify and transmute karmic impediments, develop their Buddha nature, and cultivate permanence, bliss, self and purity, i.e., enlightenment.

=== Dharma School ===
Practitioners have the opportunity to further their practice by studying at Shinnyo-en's dharma school. After three years of classes and fulfilling various requirements, including passing a written test and assessment of everyday practice, they are granted priestly ranks (僧階 sokai) and become dharma teachers.

=== Fire and water ceremonies ===
According to the Shinnyo-en website they practice water and fire ceremonies. "While most traditional Buddhist fire rituals focus on personal purification and awakening, the Shinnyo-en ceremony is dedicated to awakening people to their innate compassionate and altruistic nature, transcending all boundaries of age, gender, nationality, ethnicity, and religious tradition, and directing the positive energy of the ceremony outward with the hope that all people can live in a world of hope and harmony."

=== Other practices ===
Through mindful observance of events in daily life (muso sesshin), practitioners are encouraged to reflect on themselves and develop loving-kindness, compassion, equanimity and joy.

Shinnyo-en practitioners in pursuing the Path to Nirvana vow to abide by the Five Precepts (Pali: pañca-sīlāni) and follow the Noble Eightfold Path, although no reference can be found of Shinnyo-en teaching Right Mindfulness, nor Right Concentration, these being the last two steps on the Eightfold Path and those which contain traditional Buddhist meditation practice.

By learning to identify with others (or "place oneself in the shoes of another"), practitioners aim to cultivate the virtues of a bodhisattva.

== Shinnyo Buddhist ceremonies ==
Traditional ceremonies, derived from Shingon Buddhism—many of which can be traced back to ancient Vedic and Hindu ceremonies—are an important aspect of Shinnyo Buddhist practice. Rituals are used as means to purify the mind, awaken compassion, or to express gratitude for the chance to develop oneself and practice the Buddhist teachings.

Prayers for ancestors and departed souls, such as the Lantern Floating ceremony, and O-bon (Sanskrit: Ullambana), are believed to also help cultivate kindness and compassion within practitioners.

With the wish of creating cultural harmony and understanding, Her Holiness Shinso Ito, Head Priest of Shinnyo-en, officiated the inaugural Lantern Floating Hawaii ceremony on Memorial Day, 1999.

Traditional fire ceremonies such as homa are performed to help practitioners overcome obstacles that hinder their spiritual progress and liberation.

== See also ==
- Buddhism in Japan
- List of new religious movements
- New religious movement
- Ullambana Sutra
- Nirvana School

== Sources ==
- International Affairs Department of Shinnyo-en (1999), A Walk Through the Garden. Volume II. Foundations of Shinnyo-en, Tachikawa
- International Affairs Department of Shinnyo-en (2010), Starting Out: An Introduction to Shinnyo Practice, Tokyo
- Ito, Shinjo (2009), The Path of Oneness, ISBN 9782090601138
- Nagai, Mikiko (1995), "Magic and Self-Cultivation in a New Religion: The Case of Shinnyoen", Japanese Journal of Religious Studies, 22 (3–4): 301–320, doi:10.18874/jjrs.22.3-4.1995.301-320, archived from the original on February 9, 2014
- Pokorny, Lukas (2011), "Neue religiöse Bewegungen in Japan heute: Ein Überblick" [New Religious Movements in Japan Today: a Survey]], in Hödl, Hans Gerald (ed.), Religionen nach der Säkularisierung: Festschrift für Johann Figl zum 65. Geburtstag, LIT Verlag Münster, pp. 177–198, ISBN 9783643502780
- Shaheen, James; Ryan, Philip (2010), Unconditional Service: An interview with Shinso Ito, Tricycle, archived from the original on October 5, 2015
- Shimazono, Susumu (2004), From Salvation to Spirituality: Popular Religious Movements in Modern Japan, Trans Pacific Press, ISBN 978-1-876843-12-0
- Shinnyo-en (2012), Shinnyo-en Opens the New Yushin Center in Downtown Tokyo, Tokyo
- Shiramizu, Hiroko (1979), "Organizational Mediums: A Case Study of Shinnyo-en", Japanese Journal of Religious Studies, 6 (3): 413–444, doi:10.18874/jjrs.6.3.1979.413-444
- Usui, Atsuko (2003), "Women's 'Experience' in New Religious Movements: The Case of Shinnyo-en", Japanese Journal of Religious Studies, 30 (3–4), Nanzan Institute for Religion and Culture: 217–241, doi:10.18874/jjrs.30.3-4.2003.217-241
- Tricycle Magazine, Interview with Shinso Ito
