= Frank Bell (educator) =

British linguist

Frank Erskine Bell OBE (18 September 1916 – 14 July 1989) was a British educator. Whilst a prisoner of war (POW) in Borneo during World War II he organised a "secret university" to provide educational opportunities for his fellow prisoners. He founded the first Bell Language School in Cambridge, England in 1955 and later established the Bell Educational Trust, a charity involved in language education.

== Early life ==
Bell was educated at Haileybury and Imperial Service College and then at Peterhouse, Cambridge, from where he graduated in 1938 with a first in French and Spanish. He joined the British Army in 1940, was commissioned into the Royal Artillery in 1941, and was posted to the 48th Light Anti-Aircraft Regiment which left England on 3 December 1941, destined for North Africa. It never arrived. On 7 December the Japanese attacked Pearl Harbor, and the British force, of which the Regiment was a part, was diverted to the Far East (see Pacific War). It arrived in Batavia, Java on 4 February 1942. Singapore fell to the Japanese 11 days later, and the Japanese landed on Java at about the same time. When the Dutch forces capitulated to them on 8 March the few British troops on the island, whose role was mainly airfield defence, became POWs. Bell was interned in five different camps before arriving at Batu Lintang camp at Kuching in Sarawak on the island of Borneo in September 1943. At first the British officers and other ranks were all in the same sub-camp, but after a while the officers were separated out. As he was a 2nd Lieutenant, Bell was housed in the officers' compound. Bell was known by the nicknames "Tink" and "Tinker" (a reference to the character Tinkerbell in Peter Pan).

=== The "Kuching University" ===
Bell was largely responsible for conceiving and organising what became known by the prisoners as the "Kuching University" in the British officers' camp.

[Bell] was a delightful character with a keen mind, a quirky sense of humour and a deep commitment to his fellow man. In our circumstances of gradually increasing starvation and sickness, ever threatened by growing feelings of hopelessness, he realised that there was a great need for us to keep our minds active. The combination of deteriorating physical and mental states was truly a deadly one. We could do little about improving our physical condition, but with determination and encouragement, everyone was free to exercise his mind without needing any extra food.

— John Mackie, Captain Jack, Surveyor and Engineer: The autobiography of John Mackie

Under Japanese regulations, prisoners were forbidden to teach, to learn, to compile or possess notes on any subject whatever, or to meet in groups for discussion. The penalty for disobedience was imprisonment or death. Despite this, the university, led by Bell, established classes in seven modern languages (Dutch, French, German, Italian, Russian, Spanish and Urdu), as well as subjects as diverse as history, public speaking, navigation, pig-farming, civics, chess and poultry keeping. Bell and his fellow educators compiled text books, led classes and awarded diplomas. Classes were often held in the evenings when dusk or darkness gave some protection against surprise by their captors. Paper for writing exercises and for compiling textbooks was always at a premium: books were fashioned out of paper from soap wrappers, newspaper, the backs of letters and envelopes, and cigarette paper. These were bound into books and often covered with sarong material.

This experience was formative in strengthening Bell's interest in language and adult education. In 1946, Bell wrote an account of his time in the camp which was published some 44 years later. It included a passage, written in Cambridge University Library reading room in 1946, which could be said to sum up Bell's vision:

I look around me now. I watch men and women working – undergraduates and graduates, men in the Royal Air Force, American soldiers – all reading quietly side by side; and I am convinced more than ever that herein lies the greatest hope for the future of mankind, in the friendly co-operation that is found in study and in learning, as in no other sphere of life; enmity and jealousy cannot flourish when the welfare of common humanity is in view.

— Frank Bell, Undercover University

== Post-war career ==
After the war, as Assistant Secretary of the University of Cambridge Board of Extra-Mural Studies, Bell was actively engaged in the organisation of extension classes and lectures, courses for German ex-POWs, and University vacation courses for students from overseas. In 1948, he became Secretary of the university's committee for re-establishing links with German universities.

In 1955, Bell founded in Cambridge the first Bell School of Languages for the teaching of English to foreign students. Further Bell Schools were opened in Norwich (1967 and 1975), Bath (1968) and Saffron Walden (1977). In 1968, he acquired Concord College, where overseas students were prepared for university. In 1972, he converted both these enterprises into Educational Trusts. As of 2012, The Bell Educational Trust (an educational charity) now comprises a business called Bell Educational Services Ltd. and a charitable wing operating under the name the Bell Foundation.

Bell was Chairman of the Educational Interchange Council from 1951 to 1979 and was awarded the OBE in 1975. In 1986, he was elected Honorary President of ARELS-FELCO (the association of recognised English Language teaching establishments in Britain). He was Chairman of the Bell Educational Trust from 1988.

Bell had a twin brother, Douglas. Frank Bell was married to Elisabeth (daughter of Sir Henry Willink) and they had a son, Nick and a daughter, Tass. He lived in Cambridge for most of his life. With his wife, Elisabeth, he re-visited Kuching in 1984, and was delighted to find the Batu Lintang Teachers' College flourishing on the site of the former POW camp in which he had established the "Kuching University". After his death in 1989, Elisabeth brought Bell's 1946 account and diary entries from his time at Batu Lintang to publication.

== See also ==
- Far East Prisoners of War

== Sources ==
- Bell, Frank (1991) Undercover University (revised edition) Cambridge: Elisabeth Bell. ISBN 0-9516984-0-0 (Originally published in 1990, same ISBN)
- Mackie, Jack (2007) Captain Jack, Surveyor and Engineer: The autobiography of John Mackie Wellington: New Zealand Institute of Surveyors. ISBN 0-9582486-6-4
- Ooi, Keat Gin (1998) Japanese Empire in the Tropics: Selected Documents and Reports of the Japanese Period in Sarawak, Northwest Borneo, 1941–1945 Ohio University Center for International Studies, Monographs in International Studies, SE Asia Series 101 (2 vols) ISBN 0-89680-199-3
