= Clem McCann =

Australian rules footballer, born 1911

Personal information
- Full name: Clem McCann
- Born: 20 August 1911
- Died: 9 July 1989 (aged 77)

Playing career^{1}
Years	Club	Games (Goals)
1935	North Melbourne	2 (0)
- ^{1} Playing statistics correct to the end of 1935.

Clem McCann (20 August 1911 – 9 July 1989) was an Australian rules footballer who played with North Melbourne in the Victorian Football League (VFL).
