= Clem Conroy =

Australian rules footballer

Personal information
- Full name: Clem Conroy
- Born: 23 November 1926
- Died: 5 July 1989 (aged 62)
- Original team: Bentleigh
- Position: Wing

Playing career^{1}
Years	Club	Games (Goals)
1944–46	Melbourne	12 (1)
- ^{1} Playing statistics correct to the end of 1946.

Clem Conroy (23 November 1926 – 5 July 1989) was an Australian rules footballer who played with Melbourne in the Victorian Football League (VFL).
