= Len Holland (Australian footballer) =

Australian rules footballer

Personal information
- Full name: Leonard Holland
- Born: 28 March 1923; Newbridge, Victoria
- Died: 13 July 1989 (aged 66); Heidelberg, Victoria
- Original team: Newbridge
- Height: 173 cm (5 ft 8 in)
- Weight: 76 kg (168 lb)

Playing career^{1}
Years	Club	Games (Goals)
1946–48	South Melbourne	33 (5)
- ^{1} Playing statistics correct to the end of 1948.

Len Holland (28 March 1923 – 13 July 1989) was an Australian rules footballer who played with South Melbourne in the Victorian Football League (VFL).

== Family ==
The son of Leslie Charles Holland (1893–1986), and Mary Holland (1885–1953), née Brett, Leonard Holland was born at Heidelberg, Victoria on 28 March 1923.

He married Geraldine Carmody.

== Military service ==
Having enlisted at the age of 19 with his parents' permission, he served overseas with the RAAF as a radio mechanic during World War II.

== Death ==
He died at the Repatriation General Hospital Heidelberg on 13 July 1989.
