= Uppuluri Mallikarjuna Sarma =

Indian politician (1939–2019)

Chairman of Madyapana Vimochana Prachara Committee

Personal details
- Born: 16 July 1939 Peda Kondur, Guntur District, Andhra Pradesh, India
- Died: 22 March 2019 (aged 79)
- Party: Indian National Congress
- Spouse: Janaki Devi
- Children: Srinivas, Vijaya
- Profession: Politician

Uppuluri Mallikarjuna Sarma (16 July 1939 – 22 March 2019) was an Indian politician.

Born on 16 July 1939 at Peda Konduru Village, Duggirala Mandalam, Guntur district), to Sri Uppuluri Rama Sastry, he was one of the dedicated members of Khaddar Samsthanam, a trust established by Sri Uppuluri Venkata Krishnaiah and Sri Uppuluri Rama Sastry in the year 1935. Mallikarjuna Sarma started his association with the Indian National Congress and has been committed to the same cause since the age of 12, coinciding with the initial periods of Independent India. He was the general secretary of Andhra Pradesh State Congress and member of All India Congress Committee.

He was a skilled orator in Telugu and Hindi because of which he was chosen as the live translator for all the speeches of late ex-Prime Minister Rajiv Gandhi, during Gandhi's tour of the state of Andhra Pradesh in 1985.

Mallikarjuna Sarma contested as an independent candidate for the Andhra Pradesh Assembly constituency of Vijayawada in 2004 elections where he did a lot of social work in his personal capacity. He is one of the founding members of Gandhi Hills in Vijayawada in association with Dr KL Rao and Pathuri Nagabhushanam, a social activist.

He had served as the Chairman of Madyapana Vimochana Prachara Committee (Liquor Control Movement) since August 2007 and has been very active in the debates in the propagation of liquor or eradication mission.

Prior to being the chairman of this committee, he was the secretary of Ravindra Bharathi and conducted several cultural programs. Sarma was also conferred an honorary degree by Nagarjuna University. Shri Uppuluri Malikarjuna Sarma S/o Rama Sastry died on March 22, 2019, in his hometown of Vijayawada, Andhra Pradesh.

== Family ==
Sarma has two sisters and six brothers.
