= Bell Educational Trust =

Brtitish educational institution

Bell Educational Trust (trading as Bell Educational Services)
- Web Site: www.bellenglish.com

The Bell Educational Trust was an educational institution, that grew from the original EFL school, Bell International College, Cambridge, founded by Frank Bell in 1955. The Bell Educational Trust subsequently expanded outside Cambridge, with a number of partner schools, located in the UK and internationally. It was one of the most well-known schools for the teaching of English as a foreign language. Bell courses were accredited by the British Council.

The school closed October 31, 2025.

== History ==
=== Bell Language School, Cambridge ===
Frank Bell founded the first Bell Language School in Cambridge, England, in 1955. He was concurrently Chairman of the Educational Interchange Council from 1951 to 1979, for which he was awarded the OBE in 1975.

In 1972 he established an educational charity - the Bell Educational Trust. Its main aims remain: to provide language education, mainly in English, for adult students and young learners; to train teachers of English; and to offer language learning and teacher training experiences that will promote international understanding and intercultural exchange. The Trust has no shareholders, and money from fees is reinvested in developing and improving the services and facilities for students, and the worldwide services that are offered.

Bell staff and staff in Bell partner schools include language teachers, trainers, educational managers, consultants and materials writers, and Bell staff work closely with national and international organizations involved in language teaching worldwide.

Today, Bell is an international training organization with three intensive training centers in the UK, a Young Learner operation, a wholly owned subsidiary and partner schools in Asia. This makes Bell one of the largest British-owned providers of English language and teacher training courses.

In 2012 the Trust's business and charitable entities separated to form Bell Educational Services Ltd and the Bell Foundation respectively.

On 23 October 2025, Bell English publicly announced its closure on 31 October 2025. The organization served notice to put its three schools in Cambridge, London and St Albans into administration due to financial difficulties. The Bell Foundation charity, which works on a number of language training projects in the UK and overseas, will continue to run.

It was announced, however, that Bell Switzerland SA, (a wholly owned subsidiary of the Bell Educational Trust) will continue to operate as normal.

== Bell schools in England ==
The three main schools in the UK are the original school in Cambridge, and schools in London and St Albans (Hertfordshire). These schools cater for around 10,000 students annually, and provide intensive English courses ranging in length from a week to an academic year. Courses cover general / business English and English for specific and academic purposes, as well as a wide range of options. Bell St Albans provides full residential accommodation, Bell Cambridge specializes in academic courses, while Bell London specializes in business English courses for professional students. In the past, students were also able to attend Bell Schools in Bath, Norwich (3 schools at one time - Willow Lane, Bowthorpe Hall and The Old House), Saffron Walden and Oxford. Saffron Walden was initially named Saffron Walden International College (SWIC) and later changed to Bell College.

In addition, Bell runs residential courses for over 3000 young learner students (aged 7 – 17 years) throughout the year, in a range of locations including St Albans, and summer camps at The Leys School in Cambridge, Tudor Hall school in Oxfordshire, Badminton School in Bristol and The Royal Masonic School in Hertfordshire.

In the UK Bell employs approximately 150 staff all year round with a further 200 being appointed on seasonal or short-term contracts.

== Bell schools worldwide ==
Bell has a subsidiary school located in Geneva (Switzerland) and partner schools in Thailand and Macau.

== Teacher training ==
Teacher training is another aspect of Bell ’s offering, and courses are run in the UK as well as in most centers abroad. Bell regularly provides teacher trainers to run workshops or tailored courses in other countries. Many Bell staff are regular contributors to international teacher training journals and conferences. Bell Teacher development courses are offered during January, July and August. These take place at Bell Teacher Campus based at Homerton College, part of the University of Cambridge.

== Management, consultancy and project services ==
For many years Bell has provided a variety of management, consultancy and project services to international organizations and governments. These range from developing language training policy and institutions to management of language centers. Bell is also involved in other short-term language training, teacher education work outside the UK.

== Notable alumni ==
- Julio Iglesias
- Sonia Gandhi
