= Shinjō Itō =

Shinjō Itō (伊藤真乗; March 28, 1906 – July 19, 1989) was the Japanese founder of Shinnyo-en, a Buddhist new religious group.

He was born in Yamanashi Prefecture in Japan. After a career as an aeronautic engineer, he dedicated himself to a religious life. He trained at the Daigo-ji monastery and became a Dai-Ajari of Shingon Buddhism and later founded Shinnyo-en in 1936.

In 1950, a high-ranking disciple who worked in the temple office filed formal charges against Itō. He claimed he had been beaten during one of the sesshin trainings. Itō maintained that he was only trying to suppress the disciple's physical convulsions during the session. Itō was arrested on 20 August 1950, and the trial for the case lasted until March 1956, when he was sentenced to seven months imprisonment and three years of probation.

Besides his work as a Buddhist teacher, Itō is also known as a Buddhist sculptor and photographer. His works were featured in a Centennial Exhibition throughout Japan in 2006 and a major exhibit at the Milk Gallery in New York City in 2008. Other exhibitions include a solo exhibit at the Westwood Art Forum in Westwood, Los Angeles, California from May 8, 2008 – June 29, 2008.

== Works ==
- Ito, Shinjo, Shinjo: Reflections, Somerset Hall Press, 2009.
