= Jim Missouri =

American baseball player

- Pitcher
- Born: May 29, 1917; Bishopville, South Carolina, U.S.
- Died: July 4, 1989 (aged 72); Capitol Heights, Maryland, U.S.
- Batted: Left Threw: Left

Negro league baseball debut
- 1937, for the Philadelphia Stars

Last appearance
- 1940, for the Philadelphia Stars

Teams
- Philadelphia Stars (1937–1940)

James Albert Missouri (May 29, 1917 – July 4, 1989) was an American Negro league pitcher between 1937 and 1940.

A native of Bishopville, South Carolina, Missouri made his Negro leagues debut in 1937 with the Philadelphia Stars. He went on to play for the Stars for three more seasons through 1940. Missouri died in Capitol Heights, Maryland in 1989 at age 72.
