= Udagawa Katsutarō =

Japanese sumo wrestler (1939–1989)

Personal information
- Native name: 宇多川 勝太郎
- Born: Hideo Udagawa; December 3, 1939 Adachi-ku, Tokyo, Japan
- Died: July 24, 1989 (aged 49)
- Height: 1.79 m (5 ft 10 1/2 in)
- Weight: 110 kg (240 lb; 17 st)

Sport
- Sport: Sumo
- Retired: July, 1967
- Heya: Takashima → Yoshibayama stable → Miyagino
- Record: 447-443-15
- Debut: September, 1954
- Highest rank: Maegashira 3 (January, 1962)
- Elder name: see bio
- Championships: 1 (Jūryō)
- Updated on June 2020

Udagawa Katsutarō (born Hideo Udagawa; December 3, 1939 – July 24, 1989) was a sumo wrestler from Adachi, Tokyo, Japan. He made his professional debut in September 1954 and reached the top division in January 1960. His highest rank was maegashira 3. Upon retirement from active competition he became an elder in the Japan Sumo Association under a series of different names, since he didn't own a toshiyori-kabu of his own. He left the Sumo Association in October 1977.

== Career record ==
- The Kyushu tournament was first held in 1957, and the Nagoya tournament in 1958.

Udagawa Katsutarō
Year	January Hatsu basho, Tokyo	March Haru basho, Osaka	May Natsu basho, Tokyo	July Nagoya basho, Nagoya	September Aki basho, Tokyo	November Kyūshū basho, Fukuoka
1954	x	x	x	Not held	Shinjo; 2–1	Not held
1955	East Jonidan #70; 2–6	East Jonidan #68; 4–3–1	East Jonidan #59; 4–4	Not held	West Jonidan #51; 5–3	Not held
1956	West Jonidan #22; 5–3	East Sandanme #90; 7–1	West Sandanme #59; 5–3	Not held	West Sandanme #59; 5–3	Not held
1957	West Sandanme #15; 5–3	East Sandanme #2; 5–3	East Makushita #65; 3–5	Not held	East Makushita #72; 6–2	East Makushita #55; 6–2
1958	East Makushita #46; 7–1	West Makushita #28; 5–3	East Makushita #24; 4–4	West Makushita #22; 4–4	East Makushita #21; 7–1	East Makushita #8; 5–3
1959	East Makushita #6; 6–2	East Makushita #2; 6–2	East Jūryō #21; 10–5	West Jūryō #14; 8–7	East Jūryō #12; 14–1; Champion	West Jūryō #3; 10–5
1960	West Maegashira #15; 7–8	East Maegashira #16; 8–7	West Maegashira #12; 6–9	West Maegashira #15; 8–7	West Maegashira #10; 7–8	West Maegashira #11; 8–7
1961	West Maegashira #8; 6–9	East Maegashira #10; 6–9	East Maegashira #12; 9–6	East Maegashira #8; 7–8	East Maegashira #7; 8–7	East Maegashira #4; 8–7
1962	East Maegashira #3; 5–10	West Maegashira #6; 7–8	East Maegashira #6; 8–7	East Maegashira #5; 3–12	West Maegashira #10; 6–9	East Maegashira #13; 9–6
1963	East Maegashira #9; 7–8	West Maegashira #9; 7–8	East Maegashira #10; 7–8	East Maegashira #11; 8–7	West Maegashira #8; 6–9	East Maegashira #10; 7–8
1964	West Maegashira #11; 8–7	East Maegashira #11; 5–10	West Jūryō #2; 6–9	East Jūryō #5; 12–3	West Maegashira #12; 8–7	East Maegashira #10; 2–13
1965	West Jūryō #3; 10–5	East Maegashira #15; 8–7	West Maegashira #10; 7–8	East Maegashira #11; 1–14	West Jūryō #6; 5–10	East Jūryō #10; 6–9
1966	East Jūryō #14; 8–7	West Jūryō #10; 6–9	West Jūryō #14; 8–7	East Jūryō #13; 8–7	East Jūryō #9; 5–10	East Jūryō #18; 8–7
1967	East Jūryō #13; 6–9	West Jūryō #16; 1–14	East Makushita #20; Sat out due to injury 0–0–7	East Makushita #60; Retired; 0–0–7		
Record given as wins–losses–absences Top division champion Top division runner-up Retired Lower divisions Non-participation Sanshō key: F=Fighting spirit; O=Outstanding performance; T=Technique Also shown: ★=Kinboshi; P=Playoff(s); Divisions: Makuuchi — Jūryō — Makushita — Sandanme — Jonidan — Jonokuchi Makuuchi ranks: Yokozuna — Ōzeki — Sekiwake — Komusubi — Maegashira

== See also ==
- Glossary of sumo terms
- List of past sumo wrestlers
- List of sumo tournament second division champions
