= USS Sangamon =

Two ships of the United States Navy have been named USS Sangamon:

- The first USS Sangamon (1863) was a monitor in the Civil War, later renamed Jason and in use for coastal defense during the Spanish–American War.
- The second USS Sangamon (CVE-26) was a fleet oiler converted to an escort carrier during World War II.
