= Reg Bennett (footballer) =

Australian rules footballer (1906–1989)

Personal information
- Full name: Reginald James Bennett
- Born: 5 September 1906; St Kilda, Victoria
- Died: 21 July 1989 (aged 82); Mentone, Victoria
- Original team: Middle Park / Collegians
- Height: 178 cm (5 ft 10 in)
- Weight: 76 kg (168 lb)

Playing career^{1}
Years	Club	Games (Goals)
1930–1932	South Melbourne	39 (5)
- ^{1} Playing statistics correct to the end of 1932.

Reginald James Bennett (5 September 1906 – 21 July 1989) was an Australian rules footballer who played with South Melbourne in the Victorian Football League (VFL).

Bennett later served in the Australian Army during World War II.
