= Vuppuluri Ganapathi Sastry =

Uppuluri Ganapathi Sastry
- Born: 16 December 1888; Kakinada, Andhra Pradesh, India
- Died: 17 July 1989 (aged 100); Hyderabad, Andhra Pradesh, India
- Occupations: Scholar, writer, spiritual teacher
- Known for: study of Vedas
- Awards: 1985 Padma Bhushan

Uppuluri Ganapathi Sastry (1888–1989) was an Indian Sanskrit scholar, writer and spiritual teacher, known for his scholarship in Vedas. He was the author of Veda Sara Ratnavali, a text on Vedas.

Ganapathi Sastry was born on 16 December 1888 at Kakinada in the south Indian state of Andhra Pradesh. Veda Sara Ratnavali, a two-part text on Vedas, was written for the Endowments Department of the Government of Andhra Pradesh. The Government of India awarded him the Padma Bhushan, the third highest civilian award, in 1985. Sastry died on 17 July 1989. Sri Vuppluri Ganapathi Sastry Veda Sastra Parishat (VGVP), a non-government organization for the propagation of vedas, is named after him.
