= My Play is Done =

1895 poem by Swami Vivekananda

- by Swami Vivekananda
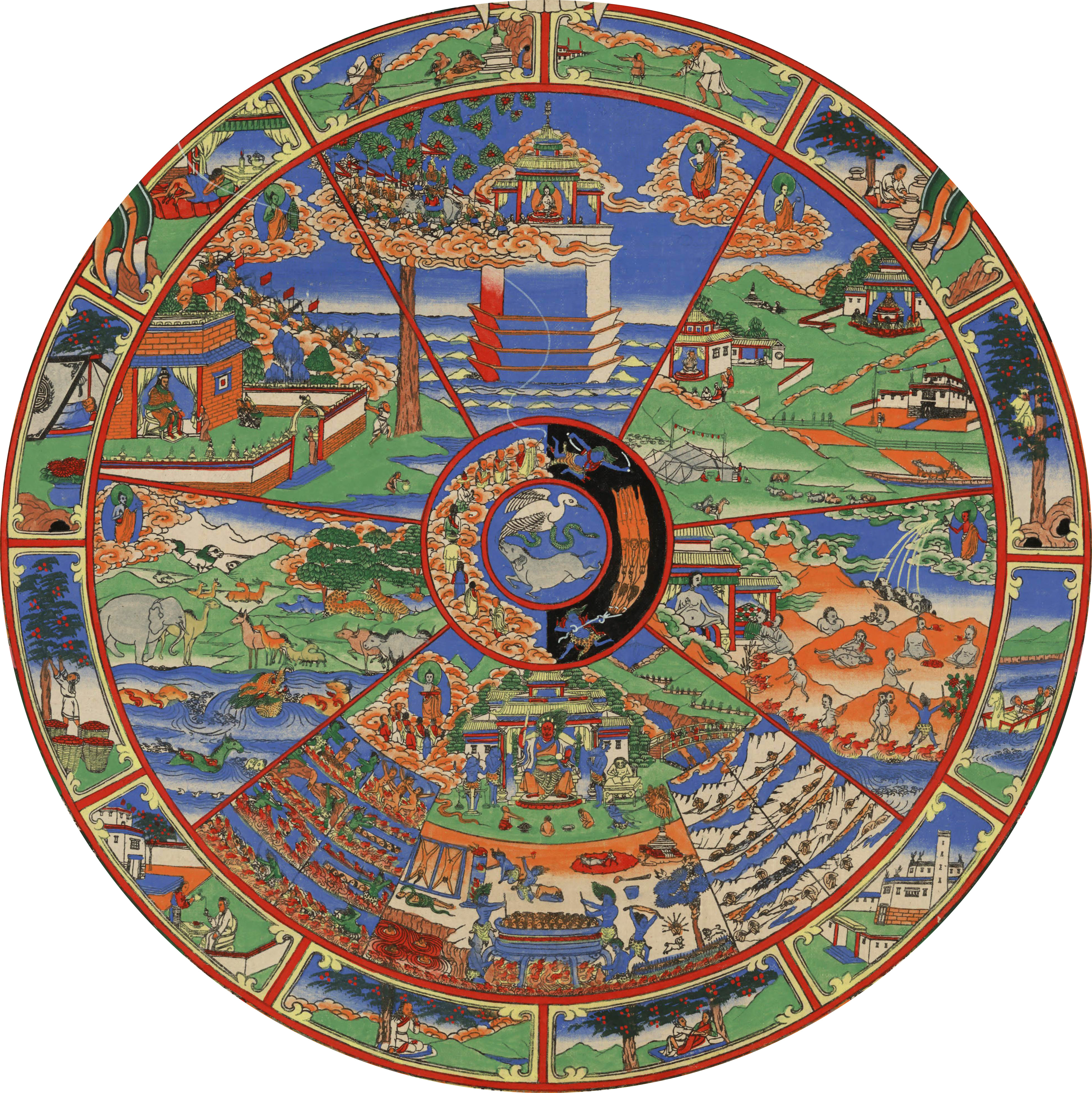
- In the poem the poet observes the never-ending waves of Samsara
- First published in: 1895
- Country: United States
- Language: English

"My Play is Done" is a poem written by Swami Vivekananda. He wrote the poem in the Spring of 1895 in New York. In this poem, Vivekananda expressed his strong desire to return home. As he felt, the task of spreading his Master's message abroad was finally accomplished.

== Background ==
In 1893, Swami Vivekananda went to the United States to join the Parliament of the World's Religions. There he got overwhelming success and public attention. From 1893 to 1896, Vivekananda conducted a series of public lectures, religious classes, discourses in different states of the United States and England. In the beginning of 1895, upon the requests of his disciples and followers of New York, he agreed to conduct a session of private classes for some of his selected disciples at the Thousand Island Park, New York. The session of private classes ran from mid-June to early August 1895. After finishing his works, he moved to New York.

At this time he was desperate to return home as he started feeling that the task of spreading the message of his Master, Ramakrishna, abroad was finally accomplished.

== Poem ==
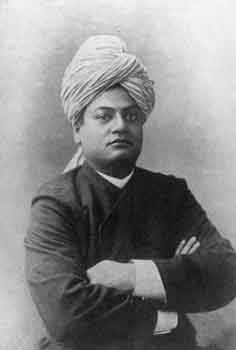
Swami Vivekananda in New York in 1895.

My Play is Done (excerpt)

Ever rising, ever falling with the waves of time,
still rolling on I go
From fleeting scene to scene ephemeral,
with life's currents' ebb and flow.
Oh! I am sick of this unending force;
these shows they please no more.
This ever running, never reaching,
nor e'en a distant glimpse of shore!
From life to life I'm waiting at the gates,
alas, they open not.
Dim are my eyes with vain attempt
to catch one ray long sought.
On little life's high, narrow bridge
I stand and see below
The struggling, crying, laughing throng.
For what? No one can know.

- Read the full poem at Wikisource

== Synopsis ==
In this poem, Vivekananda narrates and tries to explain the elements of human life from the aspect of philosophy and Vedanta. He observes the Bhavacakra, the unending waves of Saṃsāra, which are always rising and always falling. He confesses that he is sick of this unending force which is never reaching anywhere, nor can he see a distant glimpse of the shore. The poet feels, it is impossible to please the unending waves of time and life.

He fails to understand the reason and identify the destination of all the joys, sorrows, tears and struggling of men. He thinks not only he, but no one knows the answer of the question. He realizes, a man in this world has only two choices— either forgetting everything and attempting to enjoy the world as it is, where the enjoyment will be momentary and in every step he will face obstacles, or he may attempt to find the truth. When the poet chooses the second path and strives to find the truth, he discovers the whole world, (Samsara) is like "floating bubble", where everything is "hollow" including name, fame, life and death.

Then, the poet confesses that he is tired, tired of his works, tired of the non-understandable unending ebb and flow of the life and praying to God, calling Him as "Mother", who sent the poet to the world, to provide him refuge. He prays to Mother to rescue him from the world of false aspirations, delusion and cycles to life and death, as he thinks, his play (i.e. work) is done, and he should be given freedom now.
