= Abhayananda =

First woman initiated into Vivekananda's mission

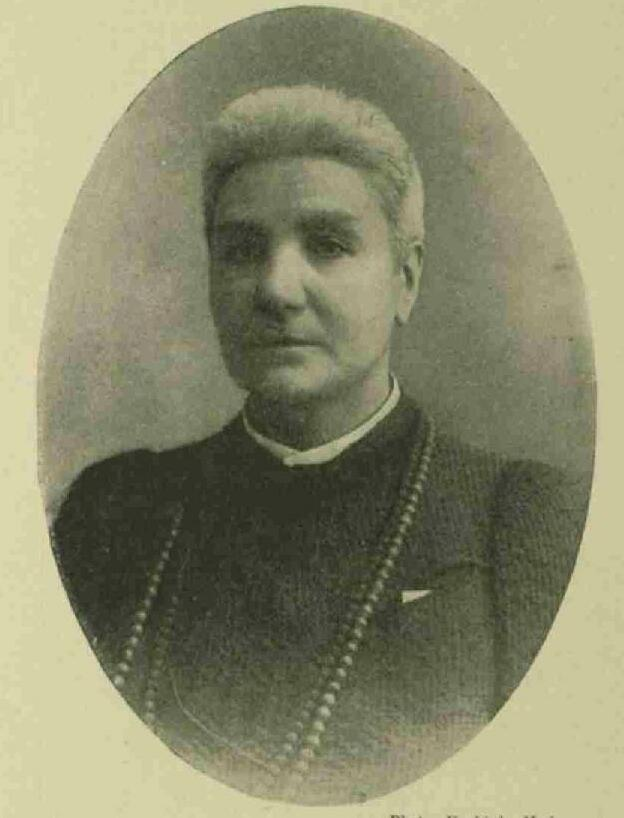
- Born: Marie Louise; 1842
- Known for: First woman initiated into Swami Vivekananda's mission

Abhayananda (born Marie Louise; 1842–unknown) was the first woman initiated into Vivekananda's mission. She was also the first American female and a female Westerner to have become a swami monk.

Louise was initiated by Vivekananda at Thousand Island Park in 1895. She was given the monastic name Abhayananda. She later disassociated herself from Vivekananda and preached philosophy, retaining the same name. Abhayananda claimed to be the only female swami in the entire world.

There were many other Westeners who, in the first half of the century, became Hindu disciples/sannyasis/gurus: others included the Mother (b. Mira Alfassa, Paris, 1878), perhaps the first Westener to become a guru in India; Swami Abhayananda (b. Marie Lousie) one of the only three Westeners whom Vivekananda, in 1895, initiated as sannyasis—the other two being Leon Landsberg/Swami Kripananda and Dr Street/Swami Yogananda.

== Personal details ==
Abhayananda immigrated to the US in 1865. Before becoming a swami and entering monastic life, she lectured on a number of issues such as woman's rights, and was a suffragist.

There appears to be only one sketch depicting her and only one photograph, appearing in an article as a "convert to Hinduism" in the Lethbridge Herald on August 10, 1912. There is a letter written by her addressed to one of his disciples, Sister Christine, referring her last arrival in India as an allusion of her desire for money. Her exact death details are unknown.

An article in The New York Times parsed "Swami Abhayananda": "Swami means monk, Abahaya means fearless, and nanda means bliss. The literal interpretation of her name is, therefore, the 'Monk of Fearless Bliss'."

Marie Louise disassociated herself from Vivekananda after she arrived in India. Sister Nivedita's letters portrayed Louise as an egotistic, self-centered woman that had little interest in hearing the Vivekananda's teachings. Louise was also alleged to have come from a destitute past and to have been in need of financial assistance.

== Her mission ==
According to Louise:

I teach four classes of philosophy-the Karma Loga(reporter might have misspelt for Karma Yoga), which is the philosophy of actions; the Bhakti Loga (reporter might have misspelt for Bhakti Yoga, the philosophy of devotion and love); the Rajah Loga (reporter might have misspelt for Raja Yoga), a physiological and psychological man, and the Gnana Loga (reporter might have misspelt for Jnana Yoga), or philosophy. ... I teach Christ the man. All men are Christs, and are crucified on the cross of life.

Regarding women's suffrage, Louise said:

"The woman Suffragists, are children playing with dolls, but if men vote, then women have a right to vote on the theory of right; but on the plane of love they have no right to vote. A 'right' implies brute force and power. A King has a 'right' to behead half of his subjects if he chooses, if the subjects preserve their 'right' to live. It is the 'right' of brutes. My ideal of government is no government at all.

== See also ==
- Sister Gargi
- Ramakrishna Math
- Ramakrishna Mission
