= Inspired Talks =

Book by Disciples of Swami Vivekananda

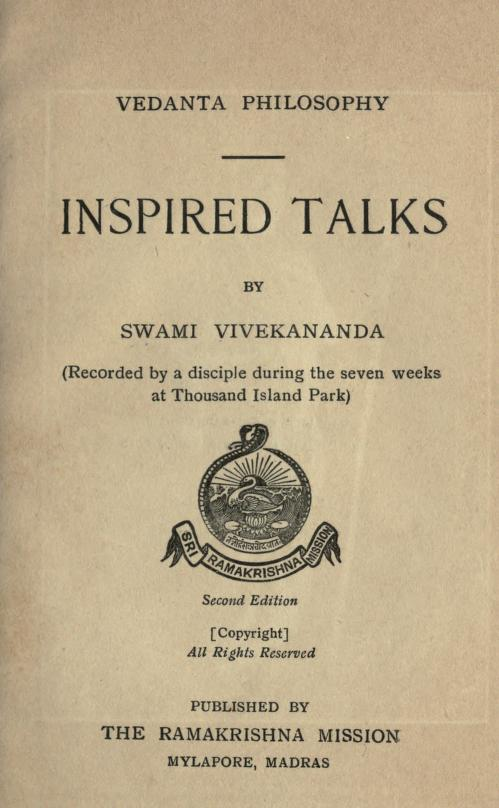
- Title page of second edition (1910) of the book
- Author: Disciples of Swami Vivekananda
- Language: English
- Text: Inspired Talks at Wikisource

Inspired Talks (first published 1909) is a book compiled from a series of lectures of Swami Vivekananda. From mid-June to early August 1895, Vivekananda conducted a series of private lectures to a group of selected disciples at Thousand Island Park. A number of lectures were recorded by Sara Ellen Waldo and she then published those as a book.

== Background ==
=== Parliament of World's Religions ===
Vivekananda represented India at the Parliament of World's Religions in Chicago in 1893 and there his lectures received overwhelming success and he himself found a lot of attention from the people of the United States. After the closing of the Parliament, Vivekananda started to conduct public lectures. He went to Detroit in 1894, where he conducted a series of public lectures. There, Sister Christine and Mary Funke heard him for the first time. After finishing the lecture series in Detroit, he went to New York and lectured in a few other cities.

=== Lectures at Brooklyn ===
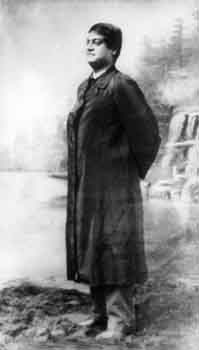
Swami Vivekananda at Thousand Island Park in July 1895.

In December 1894 Vivekananda, Vivekananda delivered a lecture before the Brooklyn Ethical Association. The topic of the lecture was Hinduism. After the lecture, the interest of listeners grew so deep that they demanded regular classes in Brooklyn. At this time, Vivekananda took several public classes at Pouch Mansion and elsewhere.

=== Classes at New York ===
After finishing the Brooklyn lecture session, Vivekananda moved to New York. But, few of his disciples started going to the place at New York where Vivekananda stayed at that time. So, Vivekananda had to start classes there too. It was a small room of a lodging house where he was staying at that time, and the number of students and disciples increased so rapidly that it soon went beyond of the small room's capacity of the chairs. But, his students still used to sit on the floor, dresser etc. to hear his words.

Attending these lectures were entirely free, and the needed expenses were attempted to be collected by voluntary donation. But later it was seen the amount they were getting through voluntary donations was insufficient to pay the rent of the house and other maintenances. So, the classes started facing financial problems. At this time, Vivekananda decided to conduct another series of public lectures to collect money to run private classes. He explained, according to Hindu tradition, students should not be charged, and a teacher has to bear expenses of his works.

=== Private classes at Thousand Island Park ===
The interest of the students of Vivekananda grew so much that they requested Vivekananda to continue the classes through the summer too. At this time, Vivekananda was very tired after multiple long sessions of lectures. However, upon the request, he decided to continue the classes. A problem arose at that time when it was found too many of his students would be out of town at that time, and they had to arrange a place to conduct the classes. The problem was solved when Miss D, one of the students, came forward and told she owned a cottage at Thousand Island Park and offered it to use the cottage. Vivekananda and his disciples accepted the offer.

From mid-June to early August 1895 Vivekananda conducted classes and delivered lectures to some selected students at Thousand Island Park.

== Publication ==
A number of lectures of Vivekananda were taken down by Sara Ellen Waldo, a disciple of Vivekananda (who was later known as Haridasi). According to Swami Ramakrishnananda— "To mother Haridasi (Miss S. Ellen Waldo) the whole world should be grateful for these "inspired" talks of Swamiji.." The book was first published in 1909 by The Ramakrishna Mission, Madras.
