= Bartaman Bharat =

1905 book by Swami Vivekananda

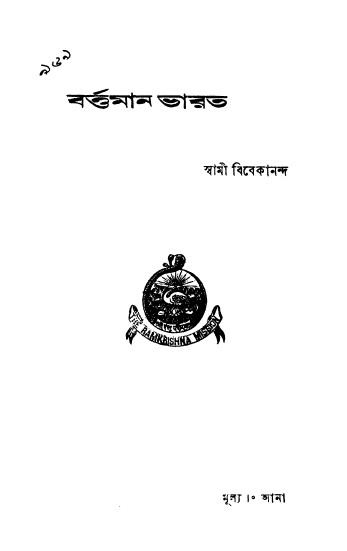
- Title page of 1905 book edition
- Author: Swami Vivekananda
- Language: Bengali
- Subject: Philosophy
- Publisher: Udbodhan
- Publication date: 1899; 1905 (published as a book)
- Publication place: India

Bartaman Bharat (translated to English as Modern India or Present Day India) is a Bengali language essay written by Indian Hindu monk Swami Vivekananda. The essay was first published in the March 1899 issue of Udbodhan, the only Bengali language magazine of Ramakrishna Math and Ramakrishna Mission. The essay was published as a book in 1905, and later it was compiled into the fourth volume of The Complete Works of Swami Vivekananda.

In this essay, Vivekananda briefly discussed and analyzed the entire Indian history and predicted a period of mass-awakening when the society will be ruled by the Shudras. The essay showed deep concern for India's distressed and poor people. He urged Indians to treat each other as brothers irrespective of their caste.

== Background ==
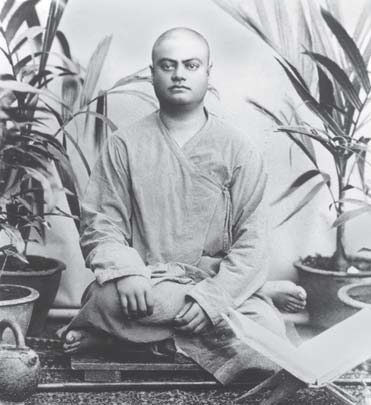
Swami Vivekananda in Madras in 1897. The same image was published in the 1905 edition of the book.

After returning from the West in 1897, Vivekananda visited many Indian states. In January 1899, he started the Bengali magazine Udbodhan, a publication of Ramakrishna Math and Ramakrishna Mission. He wrote Bengali essays Bhabbar Kotha, Bartaman Bharat, Parvrajak and Prachya o Paschatya for Udbodhan. The Bengali essay Bartaman Bharat was first published in the Udbodhan in March 1899.

== Synopsis ==
In this essay Vivekananda briefly recounted and analyzed the entire history of India, from the time when Vedic priests used to be rulers of the society to the occupation of the country by the British. But, his main focus was on his contemporary India.

He tried to describe how the society was first ruled by Vedic priests (Brahmin), who were followed by the mighty rulers, who had powers in their hands for thousands of years and were finally succeeded by Vaishya power. Then the author predicted that following this cyclical rule, the Vaishya's too will lose their glory one day and the lowermost class of the Indian society Shudras will rise to power and the whole society will be ruled by them.

He urged Indians to treat and honour each other as brothers despite their caste or financial condition. He suggested not to forget that Sita, Savitri, Damayanti are the ideals of Indian womanhood. He asked to consider the soil of India as one's heaven and the good of India as one's own good. He also suggested not to foolishly imitate the West. He wrote—

O India, this is your terrible danger. The spell of imitating the West is getting such a strong hold upon you that what is good or what is bad is no longer decided by reason, judgment, discrimination, or reference to the Shastras. Whatever ideas, whatever manners the white men praise or like are good; whatever things they dislike or censure are bad. Alas! what can be a more tangible proof of foolishness than this?

The conclusion of his essay has now become a "standard college or high school text".

== Publication ==
The essay was first published in the March 1899 issue of Udbodhan. In 1905 the essay was re-printed and published as a book from the same publication. The preface of the book was written by Swami Saradananda.

== Significance ==
According to Swami

Murlidharananda, in this essay, Vivekananda expressed his desire to see the regeneration of India. Srivastava, the writer of Teacher in Emerging Indian Society wrote in this essay Vivekananda felt that a purpose of our education should be providing service to the humanity too.
