= Sangeet Kalpataru =

Bengali songbook

- Front cover of Ramakrishna Mission Institute of Culture edition
- Author: Swami Vivekananda (as Narendranath Datta); Vaishnav Charan Basak
- Original title: সঙ্গীত কল্পতরু
- Language: Bengali
- Subject: Anthology of Bengali music
- Published: 1887; Reprinted in 2000
- Publication place: India

Sangeet Kalpataru (literal meaning: "Wish fulfilling tree of music".) is a Bengali language song anthology edited and compiled by Swami Vivekananda (as Narendranath Datta) and Vaishnav Charan Basak. The book was first published in August or September 1887 from Arya Pustakalaya, Calcutta. In 2000, the book was reprinted by the Ramakrishna Mission Institute of Culture. It was edited with a critical introduction by Dr. Sarbananda Choudhury.

== Content ==
The book was a compilation of Bengali songs. It also discussed different aspects of vocal and instrumental music. The book was divided into different sections and songs were arranged by theme. The first sections included patriotic songs. The book included twelve Rabindra Sangeets. (Note: Songs written by Rabindranath Tagore)

It contained 90-page long introduction which discussed the theory of music and 18-page long biographical notes and sketches on Bengali songwriters and poets such as Chandidas, Vidyapati, Ramprasad.

The book was compiled by Narendranath before he became an ascetic. Of the 12 songs in the book, four were written by Rabindranath Tagore of which three songs were taught by him to Vivekananda and to a few others. These songs were sung in chorus by Vivekananda and others during the marriage of Leeladevi, daughter of Rajanarain Basu that was held at Sadharan Brahmo Samaj. Narendranath had also written three songs before the publication of the book, one of which he used to sing at the Baranagore Monastery.

Some of the songs of the book were—

Song	Genre	Composer	Raga	Tala
Jabe kihe amar din biphale chaliye (in Bengali)	Brahma Sangeet		Multan	Ektal
Mana chalo nijo niketane (in Bengali)	Brahma Sangeet	Ayodhya Nath Pakrashi	Surat Malhar	Ektal
Gaganer thale rabi chandra dipak jwale (in Bengali)	Devotional	Rabidranath Tagore	Jayajayanti	Jhaptal
Malin pankila mone kemone dakibo tomay (in Bengali)	Devotional	Bijoy Krishna Goswami	Multan	Adhatheka
Bipada bhaya baran je kore or mon (in Bengali)	Devotional	Jadu Bhatta	Chhayanat	Jhaptal
Dekhile tomar sei atula prema anena (in Bengali)	Devotional	Gaganendranath Tagore	Bahar	Ektal
Tumi amr bondhu, ki boli tomay nath (in Bengali)	Kirtan		N.A.	
Dub dub dub, rupsagare amar mon (in Bengali)	Baul tune	—	N.A.	
Prabhu main gulam, main gulam, main gulam tera (in Hindi)	Bhajan	—	N.A.	

== Publication and republication ==
Sangeet Kalpataru was first published in August or September 1887 from Arya Pustakalay, 118, Upper Chitpur Road, Calcutta. The compilers of the book were credited as "Sri Narendranath Datta B. A. and Vaishnav Charan Basak". Narendranath collected and arranged most of the songs of this compilation, but could not finish the work of the book for unfavourable circumstances. The authorship of the 18-page appendix to the book, which gives brief biography of the Bengali poets such as Chandi Das, Vidyapathi and Ramdas is not mentioned. However, in the fourth edition, Naredndranath's name was dropped. In 2000, the book was reprinted by Ramakrishna Institute for Culture, Calcutta.

== Depictions ==
The book and the relationship between Swami Vivekananda and Rabindranath Tagore and Tagore family was depicted in 2013 Bengali drama Bireswar. The drama produced by Belgharia Shankhamala theatre group.
