= Lectures from Colombo to Almora =

Book based on lectures by Vivekananda

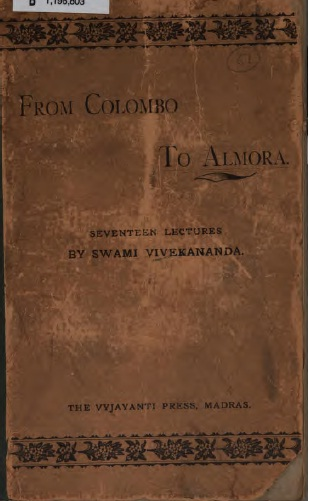
- Front cover of 1897 edition
- Author: Swami Vivekananda
- Language: English
- Subject: Indian philosophy
- Publisher: Vyjayanti Press, Madras
- Publication date: 1897
- Publication place: India
- ISBN: 9788175050815
- OCLC: 276782395
- Text: Lectures from Colombo to Almora at Wikisource

Lectures from Colombo to Almora (1897) is a book of Swami Vivekananda based on the lectures he delivered in Sri Lanka and India after his return from the West. Vivekananda reached Colombo, British Ceylon (now Sri Lanka) on 15 January 1897. After delivering lectures in Colombo and Jaffna, Vivekananda arrived at Pamban in South India. A forty-feet high monument was built by the king of Ramnad, Bhaskara Sethupathi, on the spot where he landed to celebrate his achievements at the West. Vivekananda travelled extensively and visited many Indian states delivering lectures on a variety of topics. On 19 June 1897, he reached Almora. The lectures delivered by him in this period were compiled into the book Lectures from Colombo to Almora.

== Background ==
In 1893 Swami Vivekananda went to the United States to join the Parliament of the World's Religions where he had an overwhelming success and public attention. For next four years, from 1893 to 1897, he travelled through various cities of the United States and England, and gave a series of lectures on religion and Vedanta. He returned to India in 1897 via Colombo. Vivekananda reached Colombo on 15 January 1897 where he was given a warm welcome. Vivekananda mentioned this welcome in a letter written to Mary Hale on 30 January 1897:

Things are turning out most curiously for me. From Colombo in Ceylon, where I landed, to Ramnad, the nearly southernmost point of the Indian continent where I am just now as the guest of the Raja of Ramnad, my journey has been a huge procession — crowds of people, illuminations, addresses, etc., etc. A monument forty feet high is being built on the spot where I landed. The Raja of Ramnad has presented his address to "His most Holiness" in a huge casket of solid gold beautifully worked. Madras and Calcutta are on the tiptoe of expectation as if the whole nation is rising to honour me. So you see, Mary, I am on the very height of my destiny, yet the mind turns to quietness and peace, to the days we had in Chicago, of rest, of peace, and love; and that is why I write just now, and may this find you all in health and peace!

On 16 January 1897 he gave a lecture titled "India, The Sacred Land." After staying at Colombo for four days he reached Calcutta (Note: Now known as Kolkata) on 20 January via Madras. (Note: Now known as Chennai) Between 1897 and 1899 Vivekananda travelled extensively and visited the Indian states of Uttar Pradesh, Punjab and Kashmir. On 6 May 1897 Vivekananda started his journey to Almora and on 19 June he reached there. The lectures he delivered in different places during this period were compiled into the book Lectures from Colombo to Almora.

== Lecture locations ==
Lectures delivered at these locations are included in the book

Lectures at the following locations are included in the book:

1. Colombo 16 Jan 1897
2. Jaffna 24 Jan 1897
3. Pamben 26 Jan 1897
4. Ramesvarem 27 Jan 1897
5. Ramnad 29 Jan 1897
6. Paramakudi 1 Feb 1897
7. Manamadura 1 Feb 1897
8. Madura 2 Feb 1987
9. Kumbhakonam 3 Feb 1897
10. Madras 7,9,11,12,13,14 Feb 1897
11. Calcutta 28 Feb and 4 Mar 1897
12. Almora 11 May and 27 July 1897

== Publication ==
The book was first published by The Vyjayanti Press, Egmore, Madras in 1897 under the title From Colombo to Almora. The introductory note of the book was written by Henrietta Muller, a friend and disciple of Vivekananda. Subsequent editions included lectures by Swami Vivekananda at Sialkot, Lahore, Khetri and Dhaka.

== Inspiration ==
These lectures have been the subject of scholarly studies and source of inspiration for many people. The Sri Lankan sage Yogaswami was deeply influenced by the lectures given by Vivekananda at Colombo. Vivekananda's opening words "The time is short, and the subject is vast" had deep impact on the young Yogaswami.
