= Ramakrishna Mission Swami Vivekananda's Ancestral House and Cultural Centre =

- Swamiji Bhavan
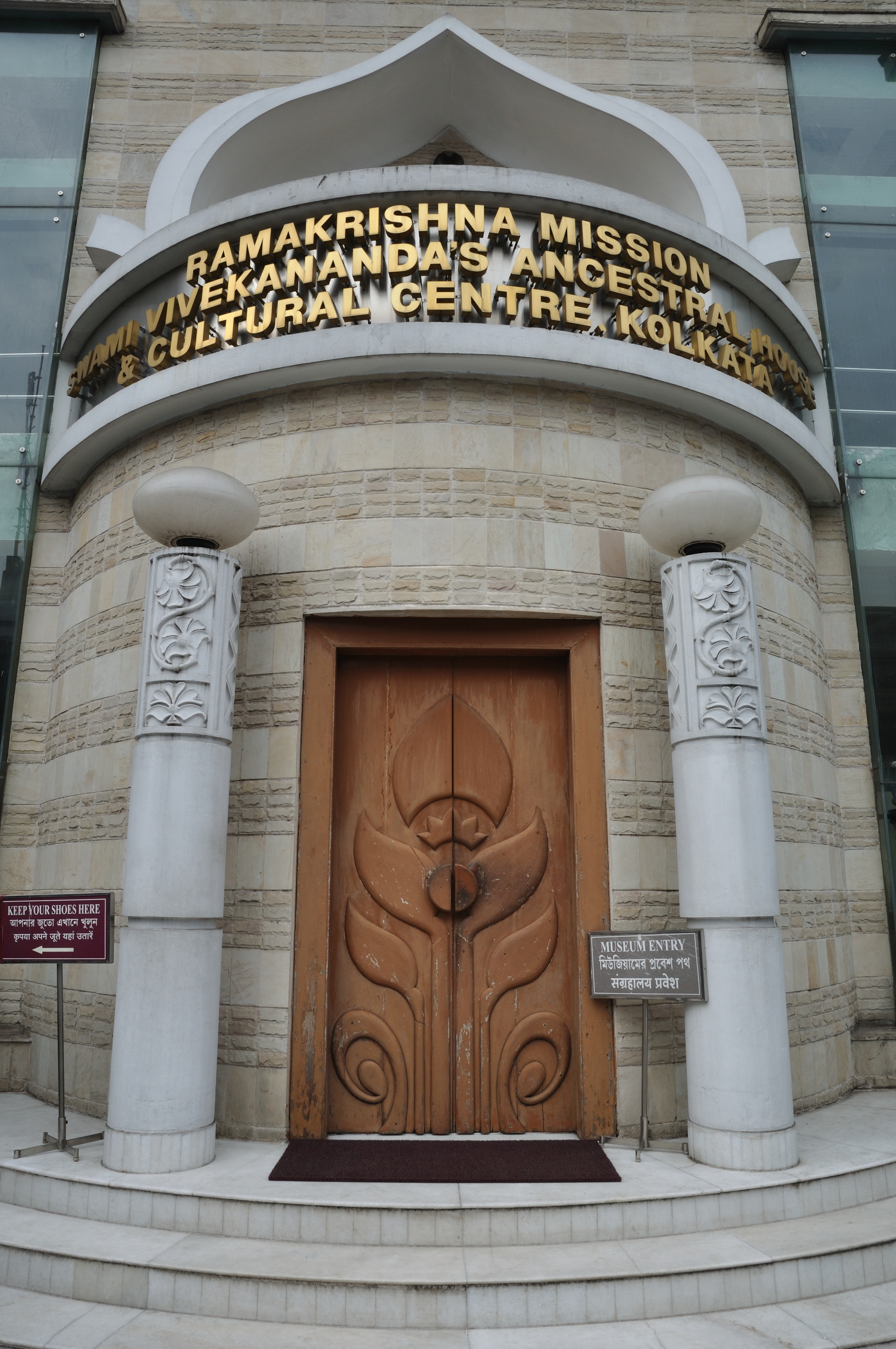
- Entrance to the Ramakrishna Mission Swami Vivekananda's Ancestral House and Cultural Centre

- Location within India
- Former names: Swami Vivekananda's ancestral house

General information
- Status: Active
- Type: Heritage place, museum
- Location: 105 Vivekananda Road, Kolkata, India
- Coordinates: 22°35′10.8″N 88°22′2.5″E
- Construction started: 26 September 2004
- Inaugurated: 26 September 2004
- Renovated: 2004
- Owner: Ramakrishna Mission

Ramakrishna Mission Swami Vivekananda's Ancestral House and Cultural Centre is a museum and cultural centre. It is located at 105 Vivekananda Road, Kolkata, India. In this house, Swami Vivekananda (then called Narendranath Datta) was born on 12 January 1863. The house remained Vivekananda's home throughout his childhood and early youth. The cultural centre was inaugurated by the President of India A. P. J. Abdul Kalam.

== History ==
After the death of his father (Vishwanath Datta) in 1884, Narendranath's aunt, who was living with them in that house, claimed full possession of the property. She filed a lawsuit against Narendranath's mother (Bhuvaneswari Devi) and her family. Vivekananda won the case in the lower court, but the case was appealed to a higher court. The case continued for many years in higher courts. It concluded only a few days before Vivekananda's death in 1902. According to the final ruling in the case, Vivekananda was awarded full legal possession of his ancestral house.

== Renovation ==
Over time, the ancestral house of Vivekananda became dilapidated. In 1962, Ramakrishna Mission authorities decided to acquire the property and turn it into a museum. In May 1999, the Ramakrishna Mission acquired the land and the adjacent plot through the Government of West Bengal. A committee was set up for this project. The committee managed to amass a fund of ₹200 million (US$2.1 million) from Central Government, State Government, and public donations of which ₹99 million (US$1.0 million) were granted by the Central Government. In 2004, after renovation, the house was turned into a museum and cultural centre.

Currently, Vivekananda's ancestral home is spread over 22,000 square feet and houses a museum, a research centre, a memorial shrine, a library, an English centre, a computer training centre, and a charitable dispensary. Seminars and conventions are also regularly organised here. There is a Shiva Lingam located at the premises.

== Gallery ==
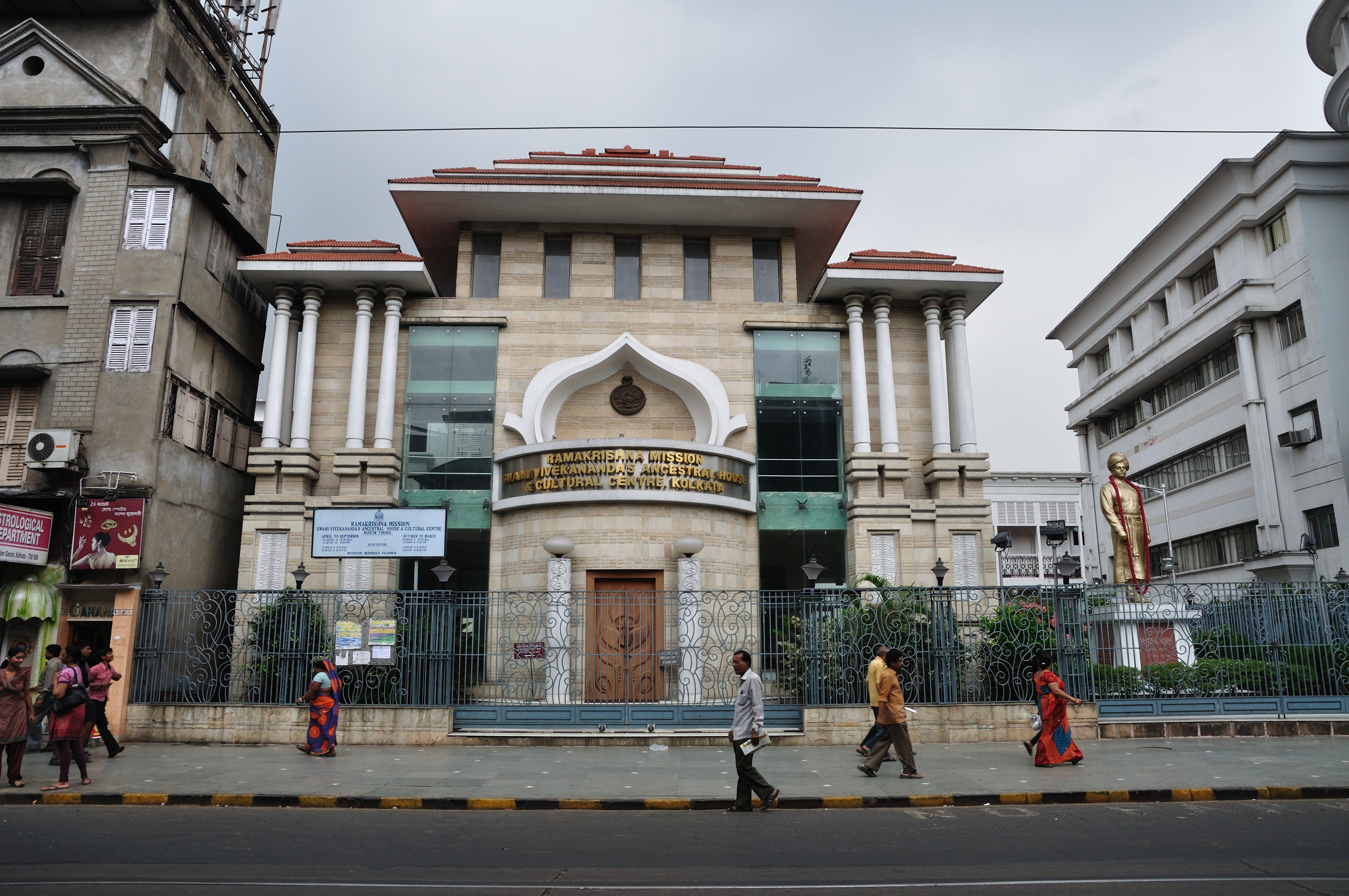
Ancestral house of Vivekananda, now a museum and cultural centre

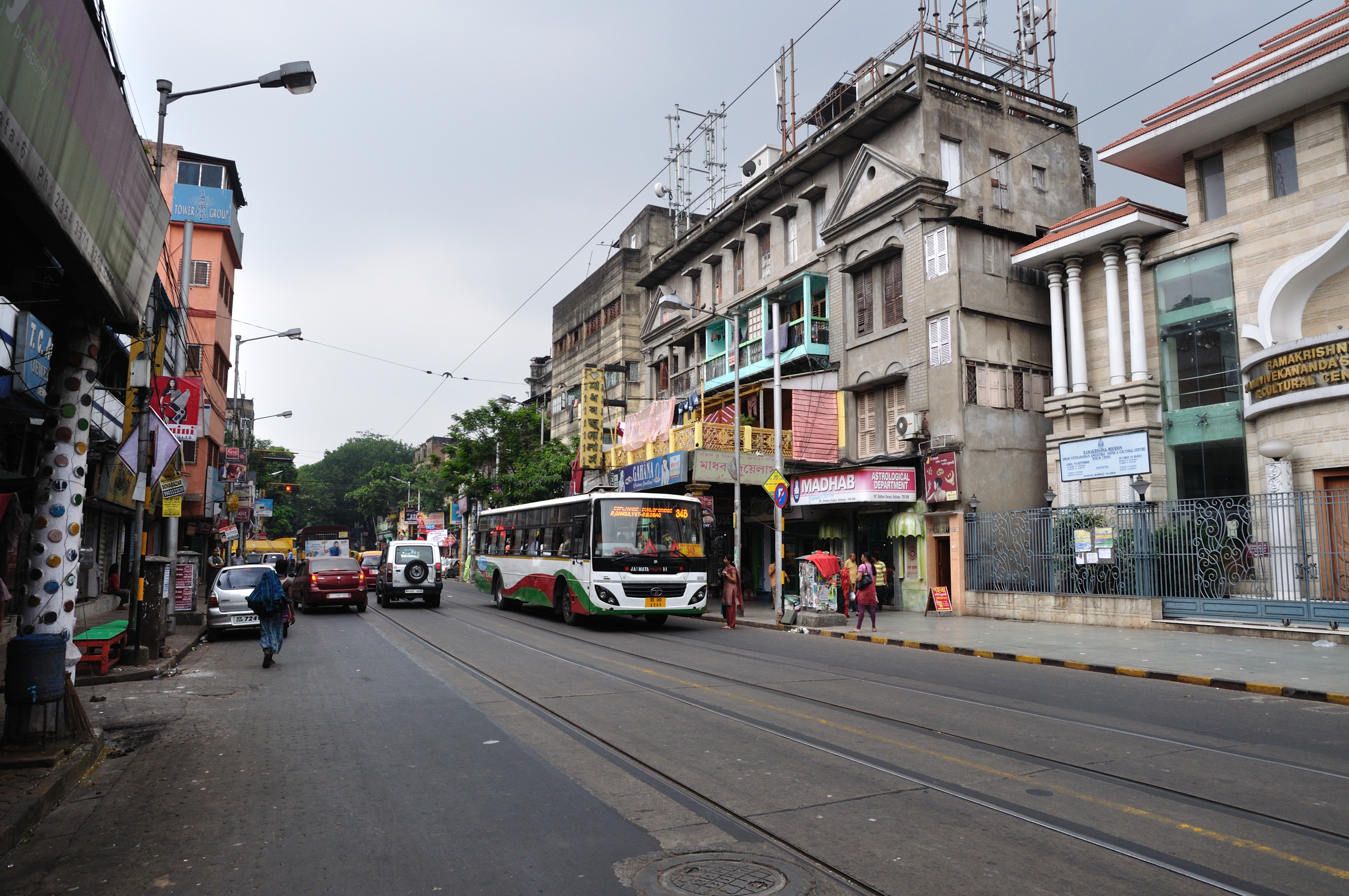
Bidhan Sarani, road in front of the house

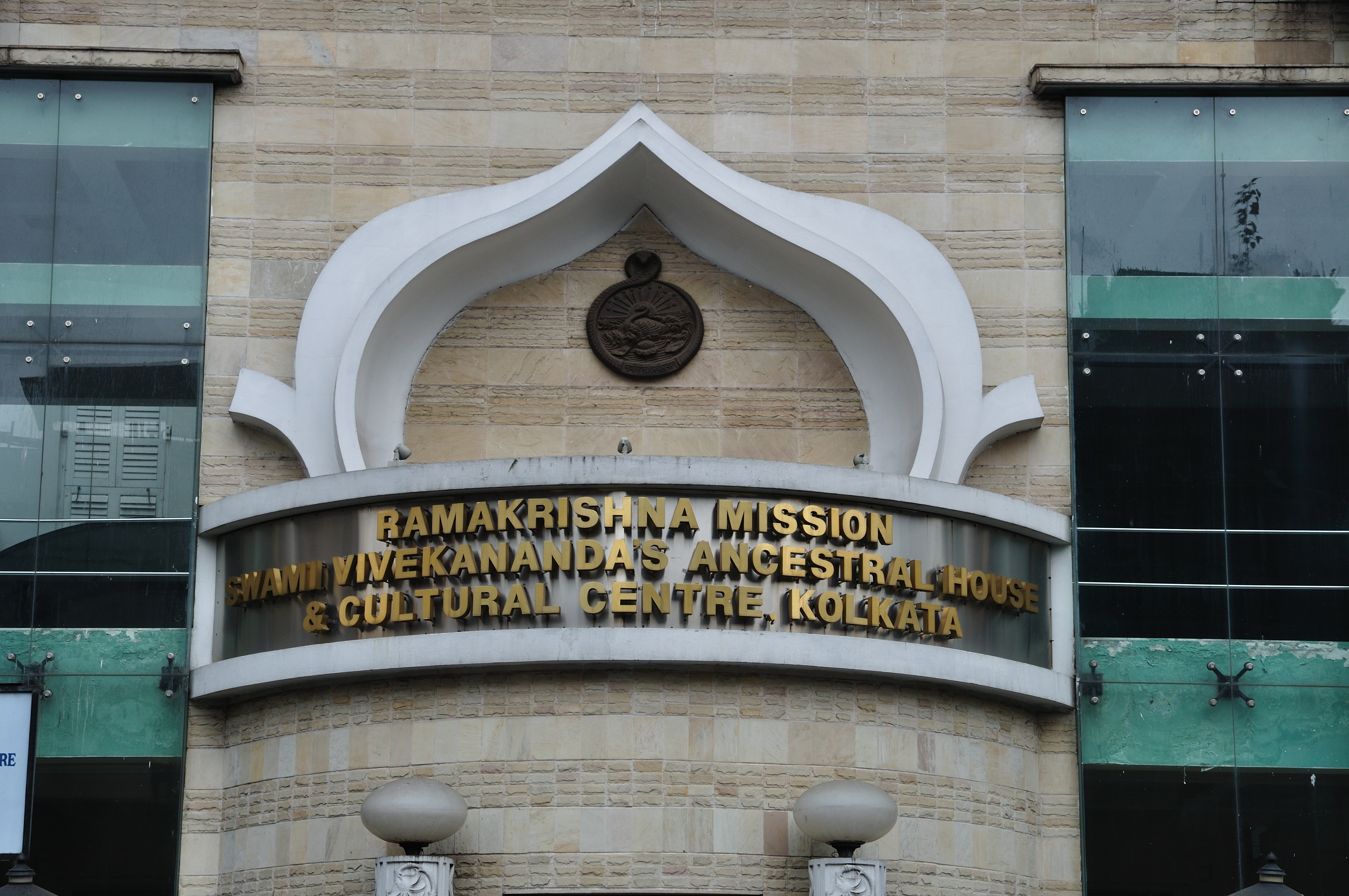
Sign in front of the museum

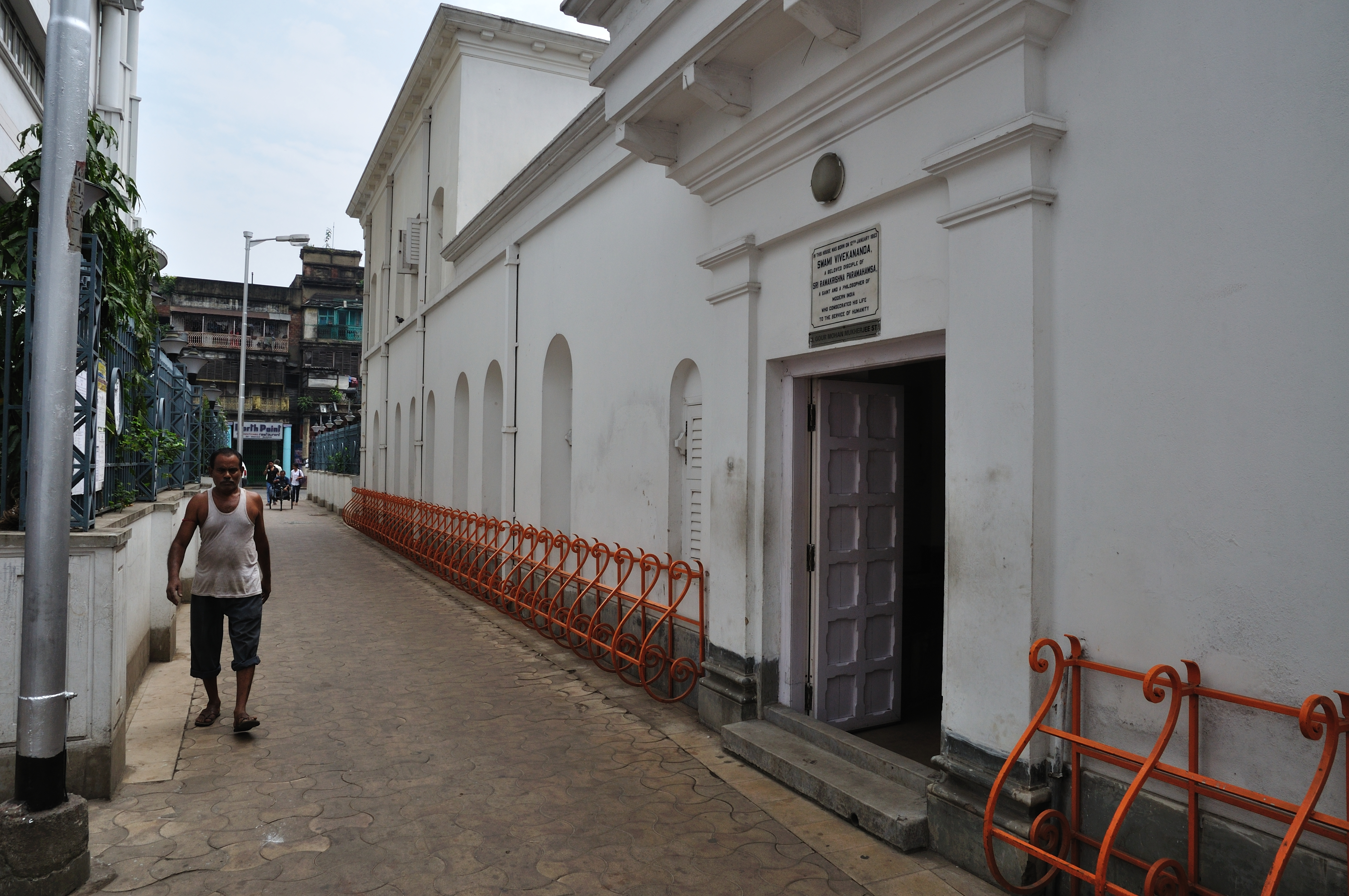
Swami Vivekananda's birthplace

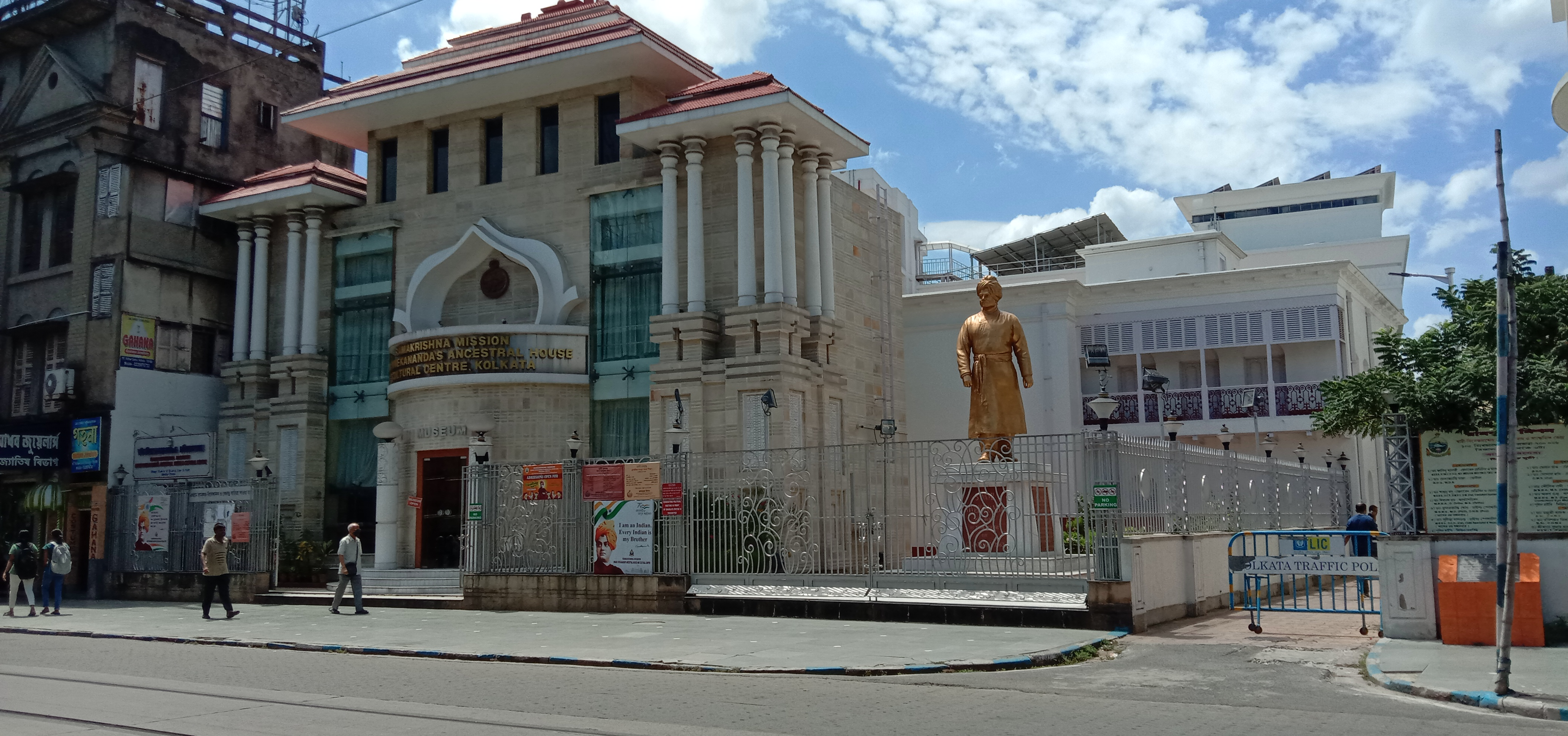
Statue of Swami Vivekananda adjacent to the house
