= Thousand Island Park, New York =

Census-designated place in New York State

- Census-designated place Historic district
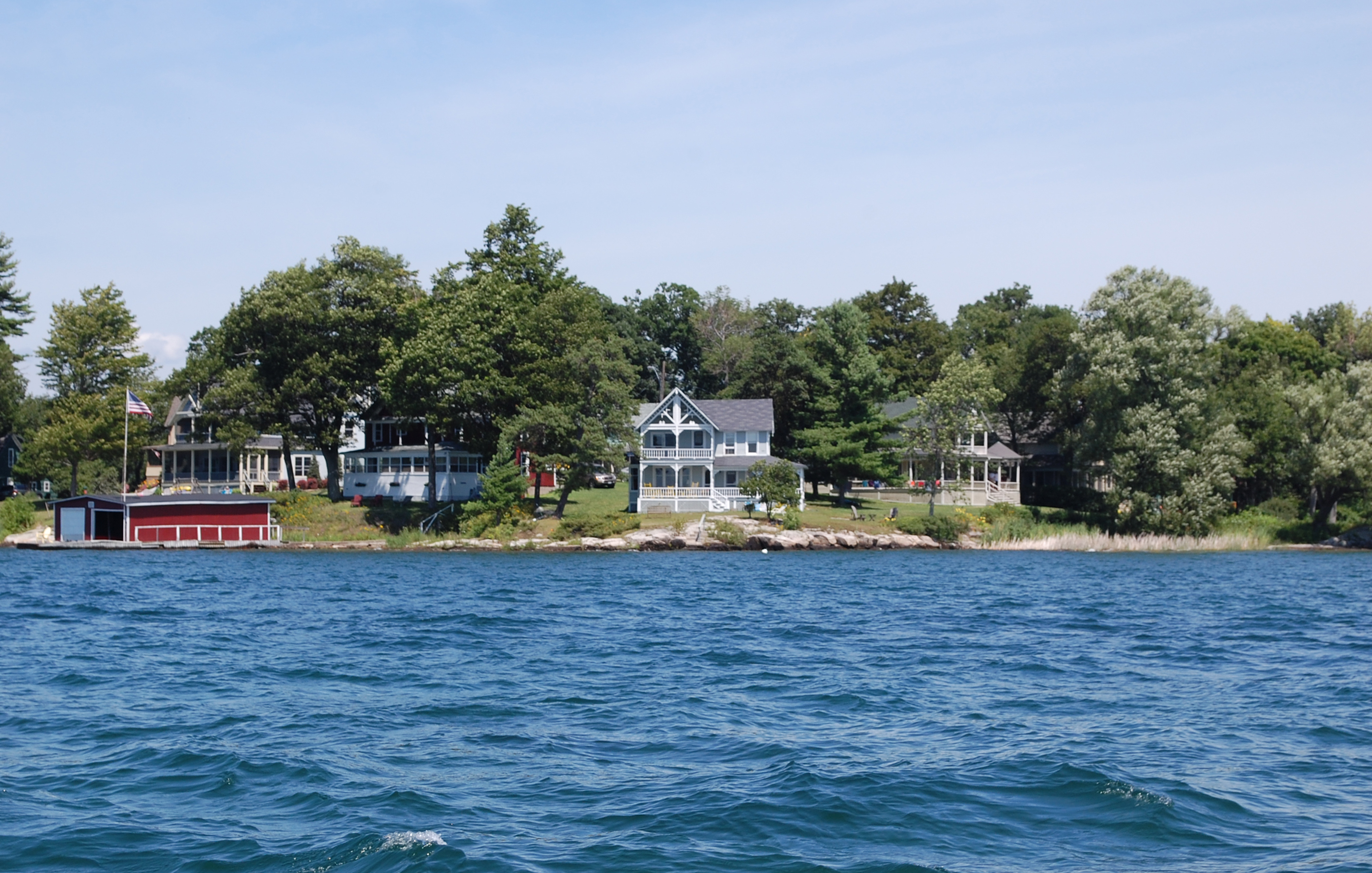
- Victorian homes on the southwest tip of Wellesley Island

- Location within New York
- Coordinates: 44°17′12″N 76°1′36″W
- Country: United States
- State: New York
- County: Jefferson
- Town: Orleans

Area
  - Total: 0.63 sq mi (1.63 km^{2})
  - Land: 0.30 sq mi (0.77 km^{2})
  - Water: 0.33 sq mi (0.86 km^{2})
- Elevation: 275 ft (84 m)

Population (2020)
  - Total: 96
  - Density: 323.5/sq mi (124.89/km^{2})
- Time zone: UTC-5 (Eastern (EST))
  - Summer (DST): UTC-4 (EDT)
- ZIP code: 13692
- Area codes: 315; 680
- FIPS code: 36-73726
- GNIS feature ID: 0967447
- Website: www.tiparkcorp.com
- Thousand Island Park Historic District
- U.S. National Register of Historic Places
- U.S. Historic district
- Location: S tip of Wellesley Island, Orleans, New York
- Coordinates: 44°17′18″N 76°1′33″W
- Area: 176 acres (71 ha)
- Built: 1875
- Architectural style: Late 19th And 20th Century Revivals; Late Victorian
- NRHP reference No.: 82001177 (original); 100007414 (increase)

Significant dates
- Added to NRHP: November 14, 1982
- Boundary increase: February 14, 2022

Thousand Island Park, also known as TI Park, is a hamlet and census-designated place (CDP) in the town of Orleans, Jefferson County, New York, United States, in the Thousand Islands region on the St. Lawrence River. Founded in 1875 as a holiday camp, the incorporated community remains a seasonal summer community; despite 323 housing units, it had a population of 96 at the 2020 census.

The community is a national historic district, listed on the National Register of Historic Places in 1982. The district is notable for its outstanding concentration of substantially-intact late 19th-century and early 20th-century resort architecture. The park also contains Vivekananda Cottage, a Hindu sacred site visited by the Swami Vivekananda and his followers.

== Geography ==
Thousand Island Park is in the northern part of the town of Orleans, at the southwest end of Wellesley Island, one of the largest of the Thousand Islands. It is bordered to the east by Wellesley Island State Park. The community is reached by automobile using County Route 100, which leads northeast 2.5 miles (4.0 km) to Interstate 81 at Exit 51.

According to the United States Census Bureau, the Thousand Island Park CDP has a total area of 0.29 square miles (0.76 km^{2}), all land.

Rock Island Light is 0.5 miles (0.8 km) southeast of Thousand Island Park in the middle of the south channel of the St. Lawrence, known as American Narrows, and Fishers Landing is directly across the narrows on the mainland, 1 mile (1.6 km) southeast of the community.

== Demographics ==
As of the 2020 US Census, the population of the Thousand Island Park CDP was 96.

Historical population
Census	Pop.	Note	%±
2010	31		—
2020	96		209.7%
U.S. Decennial Census

== History ==
=== 1875–1912: Golden Era ===
In 1875, Thousand Island Park was founded by Rev. J.F. Dayan, as a Methodist summer, Chautauqua-like community. The main purpose was to enable families to secure pleasant lots for cottages or tents where they could spend a portion of the summer in a beautiful, cool, and salubrious place with religious purposes being secondary. The Park's landmarks, homes, and way of life were nearly destroyed by fire. It is fortunate so much remains.

The Methodist summer camp colony that surrounded the Tabernacle was soon transformed from a tent city into a permanent village of summer residences. It was built on a scale far surpassing other similar associations. All roads lead to the Tabernacle centered prominently and squarely at the head of the Park on St. Lawrence Ave. The Tabernacle was the center for socialization and participation in Chautauqua-like programs which included religious studies, Sunday school institutes, outdoor recreation, travel lectures, temperance rallies and discussion of social reforms.

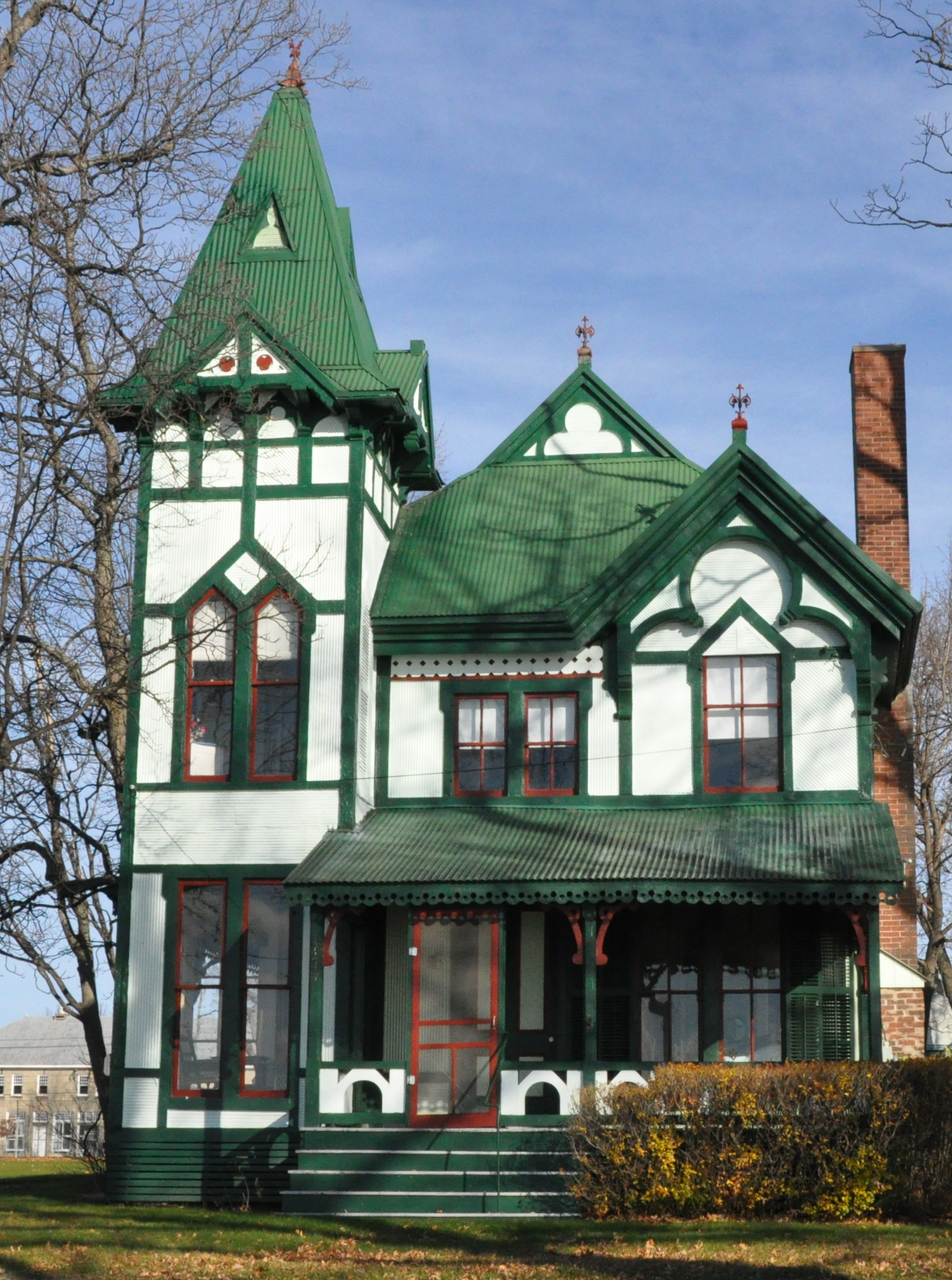
An example of a 19th-century Carpenter Gothic Revival style cottage on Thousand Island Park.

Campers leased lots, set up their tents on the preferred, prime lots closest to the Tabernacle. This grouping of tents was often called a tent city. The first diminutive cottages were tents constructed of wood on the original wooden tent platform. Individual owners also improvised, conceived and produced hybrids, combining styles and embellishing these small Tent Platform/Campground style structures, called the Landmark Shop, with fanciful gingerbread.

As the architecture on the Park evolved, larger structures came into vogue. Much of the look of these Victorian cottages derives its characteristics from the varied styles of nineteenth-century architecture. In addition to the charming Gothic Tent style cottages, Gothic Revival, Eastlake, Stick, Shingle, and Queen Anne became popular architectural styles. After the fire of 1912, Bungalow/Craftsman styles, Neoclassical Revival style, and vernacular cottages were added to the Park's varied styles of architecture.

By 1890, the Park was firmly established with nearly 600 cottages and 7,000 summer inhabitants. A more liberal policy relaxed restrictions on curfews and the prohibition of cards and alcohol bringing more of a resort character to the Park. The Pavilion was the main entry to this Methodist retreat at a time when all travel to Wellesley Island was by water. The new, larger Pavilion was able to accommodate the landing of steamships and served as the gateway to the Park with hundreds of visitors seeking intellectual pursuits and entertainment by participating in the Chautauqua programs.

The destruction by fire in 1912 of the Park's last great hotel, The Columbian and 99 cottages plus the business district, signaled the end of the Golden Era.

=== 1913–1974: Mid-century changes ===
Following the fire, families continued to summer in the park but tourism in the region slowly declined. After the fire and through the Great Depression, barely half of the cottages were occupied and eventually, another 200 cottages were torn down.

In 1933, the Thousand Island Park Association corporation was foreclosed due to financial troubles and the property was sold to the new Wellesley Island Park Inc. TI Park continued to decline in the following two decades. Most of the Park’s hotels closed and many cottages were torn down; by 1950, there were only 12 businesses and 320 cottages on the Park, compared to 600 in the late 1800s. The park corporation was deeply in debt; in 1953, it became the Thousand Island Park Corporation. Families continued to enjoy the park during the summer and it became a mostly non-religious community in the 1960s and '70s.

=== 1975–present: Historic preservation and revival ===
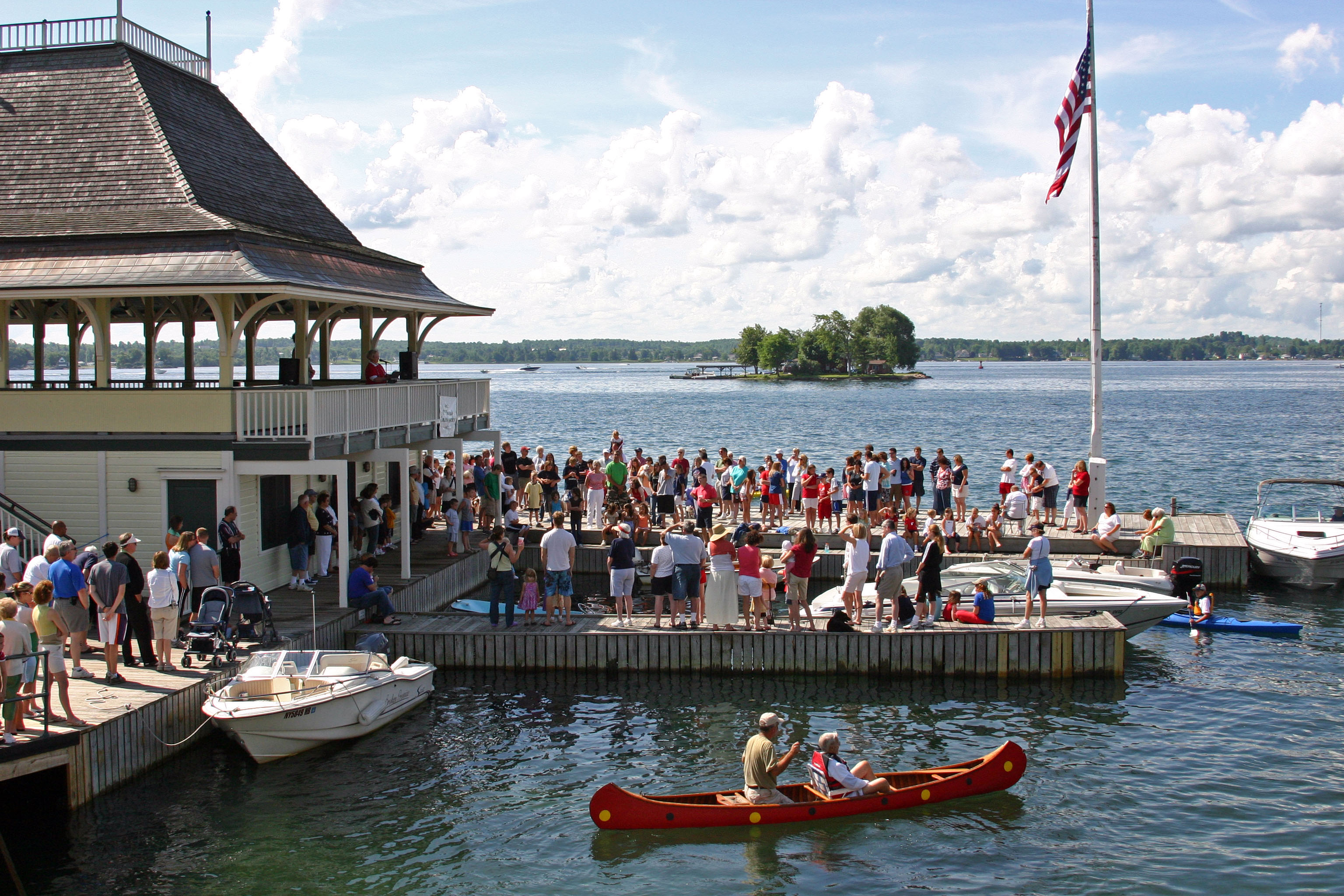
The Pavilion located on the St. Lawrence River, pictured in 2008

In 1975, the Centennial Celebration served as a catalyst for change in the Park; the architectural charm and setting was once again appreciated. The Centennial Year Celebration inspired the formation of the Landmark Society in 1976, and the path that led to the Park regaining its architectural character and integrity. A small group of dedicated Landmark Society members initiated the nomination of Thousand Island Park to the National Register of Historic Places, finally achieved in 1982. The Thousand Island Park Landmark Society is supported today by individuals who promote the mission set forth by the Landmark founders.

The restoration and preservation of TI Park continued into the 2000s. In 2014, the park faced another serious fire when the building at the community's four corners, containing The Guzzle, grocery store, volunteer fire department, a few small shops and offices, a plumbing company, and the post office, burned down. A smaller replacement building was rebuilt on that corner and opened in 2017.

== Swami Vivekananda ==
In 1895, the Swami Vivekananda spent seven weeks in Thousand Island Park. The swami is an Indian saint best known for his contributions to the interfaith movement and introduction of vedanta and yoga in the Western world.

Residing with an American follower in her cottage, the stay served as a respite following the swami's two-year American tour following his address at the 1893 Parliament of the World's Religions. He performed lectures to visiting members of his Vedanta Society, which were later compiled into the book Inspired Talks, published in 1909. He also composed poems including "The Song of the Sannyasin" and "My Play is Done."

In 1947, followers of the Swami Vivekananda purchased the building and named it the Vivekananda Cottage; it is now owned and operated by the Ramakrishna-Vivekananda Center which holds classes and retreats there during the summer. The cottage has become a Hindu sacred site. A plaque dedication service was organized in 1995 by the Park to commemorate the centenary of the Swami Vivekananda’s arrival in Thousand Island Park.

== Education ==
The school district is La Fargeville Central School District.

== Notable people ==
- Abbie Hoffman (1936–1989) – activist and member of the Chicago Seven; resident of the neighboring Fineview community in the late 1970s
- Abhayananda (b. 1842) – American swami monk; visited in 1895
- George N. Kennedy (1822–1901) – New York state senator; death place
- Sister Christine (1866–1930) – American disciple of Swami Vivekananda; visited in 1895
- Swami Vivekananda (1863–1902) – Indian swami monk and philosopher; visited and lectured in 1895

== In popular culture ==
- Title of a song on the 1973 jazz fusion album Birds of Fire by Mahavishnu Orchestra

== See also ==
- Wellesley Island
- Thousand Islands
