= Swami Vivekananda =

Indian monk and philosopher (1863–1902)

- Svāmī Vivekānanda
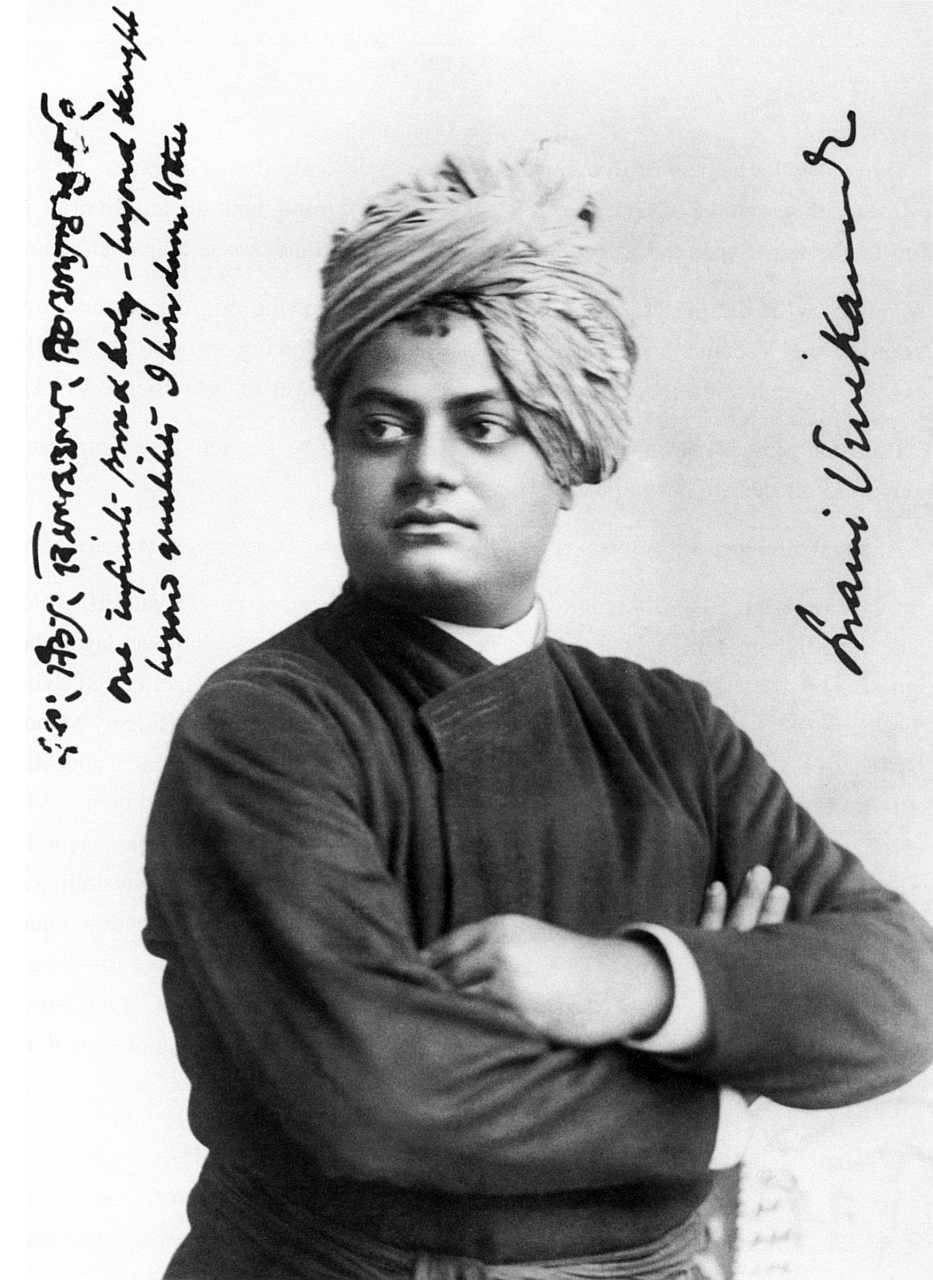
- Vivekananda in Chicago, September 1893. In note on the left Vivekananda wrote: "One infinite pure and holy – beyond thought beyond qualities I bow down to thee".

Personal life
- Born: Narendranath Datta; 12 January 1863 Calcutta, Bengal Presidency, British India (present-day Kolkata, West Bengal, India)
- Died: 4 July 1902 (aged 39) Belur Math, Bengal Presidency, British India (present-day West Bengal, India)
- Citizenship: British subject
- Era: Modern philosophy: 19th-century philosophy
- Region: Eastern philosophy: Indian philosophy
- Notable works: Raja Yoga; Karma Yoga; Bhakti Yoga; Jnana Yoga; My Master; Lectures from Colombo to Almora
- Education: University of Calcutta (BA)

Religious life
- Religion: Hinduism
- Founder of: Ramakrishna Mission (1897); Ramakrishna Math
- Philosophy: Advaita Vedanta; Rāja Yoga
- School: Vedanta; Yoga
- Lineage: Daśanāmi Sampradaya

Religious career
- Teacher: Ramakrishna
- Disciples: Ashokananda; Virajananda; Paramananda; Alasinga Perumal; Abhayananda; Sister Nivedita; Swami Sadananda
- Influenced by: Tagore; Ramakrishna; Sen; Spencer; Max Müller

Quotation

"Arise, awake, and stop not till the goal is reached"
(more on Wikiquote)

Swami Vivekananda (/ˈswɑːmi ˌvɪveɪˈkɑːnəndə/) (Note: Bengali: স্বামী বিবেকানন্দ; pronounced [ʃami bibekanɔndo];; IAST: Svāmī Vivekānanda) (12 January 1863 – 4 July 1902), born Narendranath Datta, (Note: নরেন্দ্রনাথ দত্ত; pronounced [nɔrendronatʰ dɔto]) was an Indian Hindu monk, philosopher, author, religious teacher, and the chief disciple of the Indian mystic Ramakrishna. Vivekananda was a major figure in the introduction of Vedanta and Yoga to the Western world during the late 19th century, and is credited with raising interfaith awareness and elevating Hinduism to the status of a major world religion.

Vivekananda showed an early inclination towards religion and spirituality. At the age of 18, he met Ramakrishna and became his devoted disciple, and later took up the vows of a sannyasin (renunciate). Following Ramakrishna’s death, Vivekananda travelled extensively across the Indian subcontinent as a wandering monk, gaining first-hand knowledge of the often harsh living conditions endured by the Indian masses under then British India, he sought a way to alleviate their suffering by establishing social services but lacked capital. In 1893, he travelled to the United States to participate in the Parliament of the World's Religions in Chicago, where he delivered a landmark speech beginning with the words "Sisters and brothers of America...". His powerful message introduced Hindu spiritual thought and advocated for both religious tolerance as well as universal acceptance. The speech made a profound impression; an American newspaper described him as "an orator by divine right and undoubtedly the greatest figure at the Parliament".

Following his success in Chicago, Vivekananda lectured widely across the United States, the United Kingdom, and continental Europe, disseminating the essential principles of Hindu philosophy. He established the Vedanta Society of New York and the Vedanta Society of San Francisco (now the Vedanta Society of Northern California), both of which became the foundations for later Vedanta Societies in the West. In India, he founded the Ramakrishna Math, a monastic order for spiritual training, and the Ramakrishna Mission, dedicated to social services, education, and humanitarian work.

Vivekananda is widely regarded as one of the greatest modern Indian thinkers. He was a prominent philosopher, social reformer, and the most successful proponent of Vedanta philosophy abroad. He played a crucial role in the Hindu revivalist movement and contributed significantly to the rise and development of Indian nationalism in colonial India. Celebrated as a patriotic saint, his birth anniversary is observed in India as National Youth Day.

== Early life (1863–1888) ==
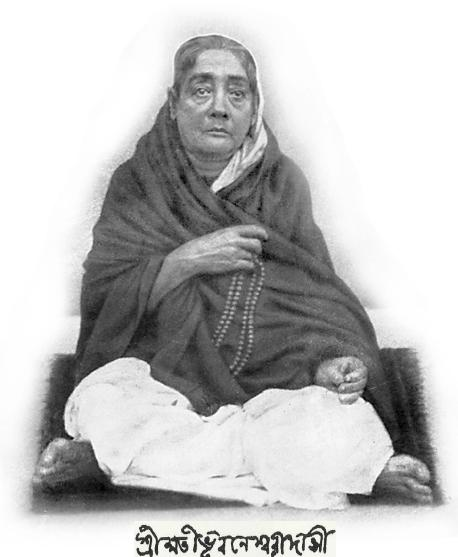
Bhubaneswari Devi (1841–1911); "I am indebted to my mother for the efflorescence of my knowledge." – Vivekananda

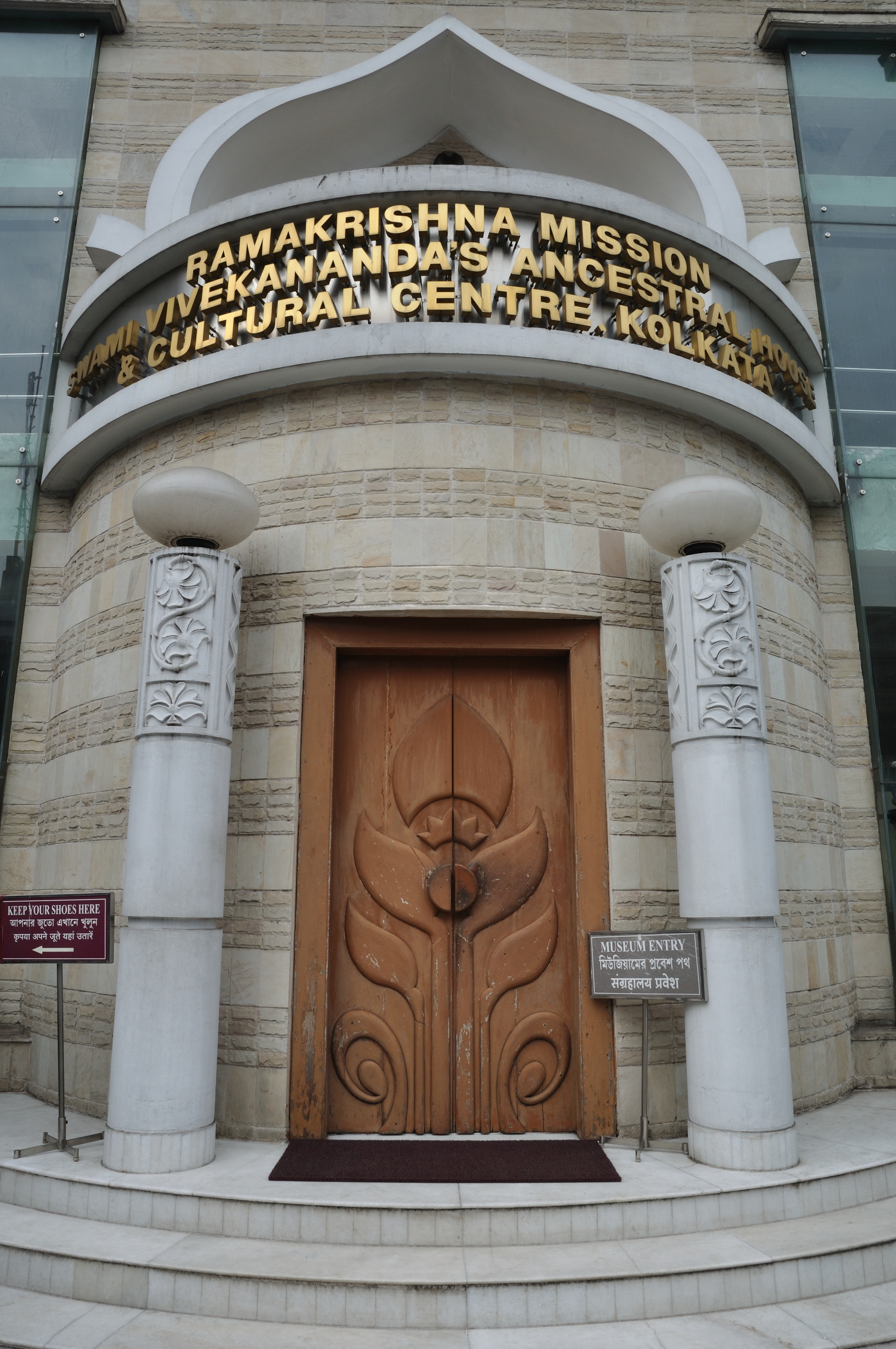
3, Gourmohan Mukherjee Street, birthplace of Vivekananda, now converted into a museum and cultural centre

=== Birth and childhood ===
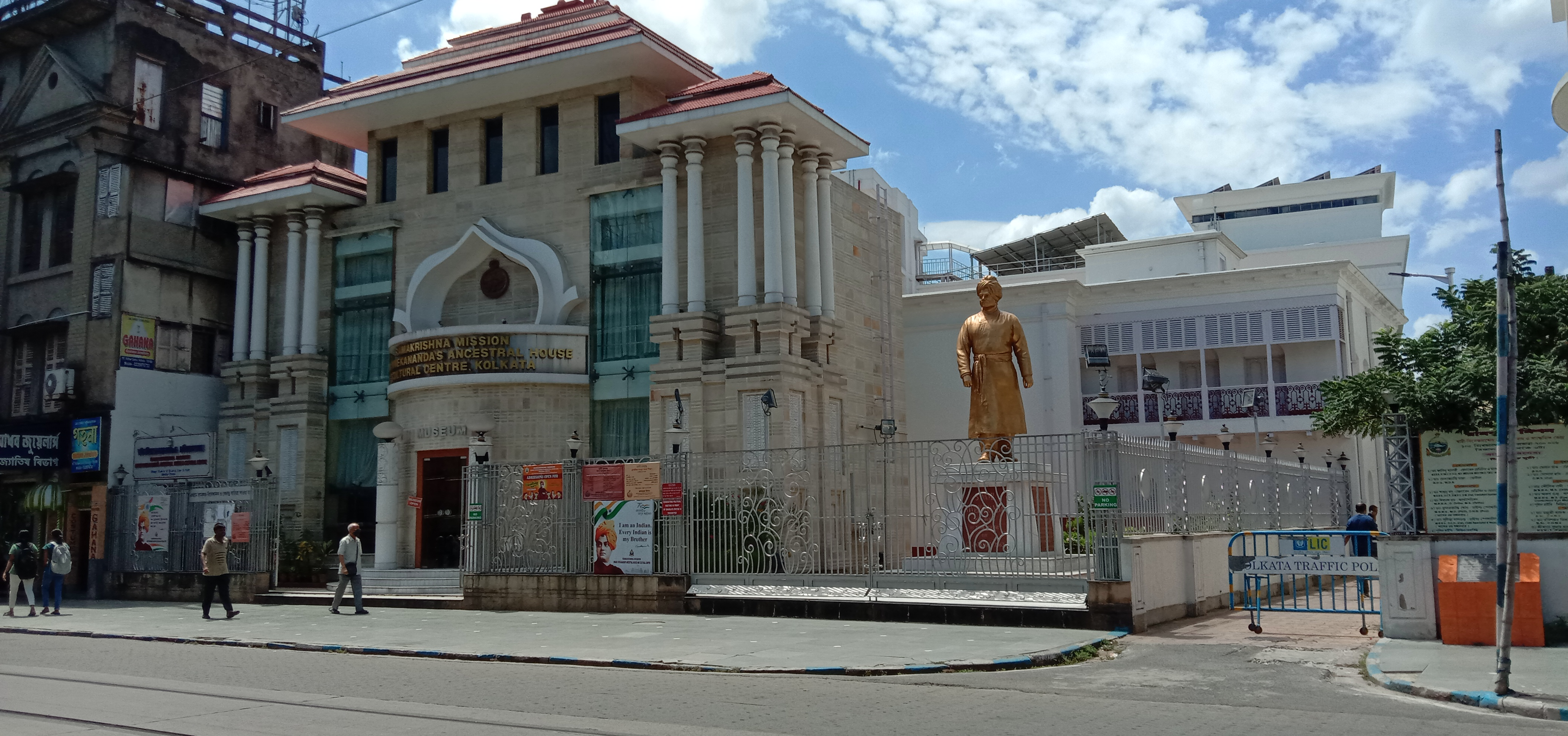
Statue of Vivekananda at the Ramakrishna Mission Swami Vivekananda's Ancestral House and Cultural Centre

Vivekananda was born as Narendranath Datta (name shortened to Narendra or Naren) in an aristocratic Bengali Kayastha family in his ancestral home at 3 Gourmohan Mukherjee Street in Calcutta, the capital of British India, on 12 January 1863 during the Makar Sankranti festival. He was one of nine siblings. His father, Vishwanath Datta, was an attorney at the Calcutta High Court. Durgacharan Datta, Narendra's grandfather was a Sanskrit and Persian scholar who left his family and became a monk at age twenty-five. His mother, Bhubaneswari Devi, was a devout housewife. The progressive, rational attitude of Narendra's father and the religious temperament of his mother helped shape his thinking and personality. Narendranath was interested in spirituality from a young age and used to meditate before the images of deities such as Shiva, Rama, Sita, and Hanuman. He was fascinated by wandering ascetics and monks. Narendra was mischievous and restless as a child, and his parents often had difficulty controlling him. His mother said, "I prayed to Shiva for a son and he has sent me one of his demons".

=== Education ===
In 1871, at the age of eight, Narendranath enrolled at Ishwar Chandra Vidyasagar's Metropolitan Institution, where he went to school until his family moved to Raipur in 1877. In 1879, after his family's return to Calcutta, he was the only student to receive first-division marks in the Presidency College entrance examination. He was an avid reader in a wide range of subjects, including philosophy, religion, history, social science, art and literature. He was also interested in Hindu scriptures, including the Vedas, the Upanishads, the Bhagavad Gita, the Ramayana, the Mahabharata and the Puranas. Narendra was trained in Indian classical music, and regularly participated in physical exercise, sports and organised activities. He studied Western logic, Western philosophy and European history at the General Assembly's Institution (now known as the Scottish Church College). In 1881, he passed the Fine Arts examination, and completed a Bachelor of Arts degree in 1884. Narendra studied the works of David Hume, Immanuel Kant, Johann Gottlieb Fichte, Baruch Spinoza, Georg W. F. Hegel, Arthur Schopenhauer, Auguste Comte, John Stuart Mill and Charles Darwin. He became fascinated with the evolutionism of Herbert Spencer and corresponded with him. He translated Spencer's book Education (1861) into Bengali. While studying Western philosophers, he also learned Sanskrit scriptures and Bengali literature.

William Hastie (the principal of Scottish Church College, Calcutta, from where Narendra graduated) wrote of him: "Narendra is really a genius. I have travelled far and wide but I have never come across a lad of his talents and possibilities, even in German universities, among philosophical students. He is bound to make his mark in life". He was known for his prodigious memory and speed reading ability, and a number of anecdotes attest to this. Some accounts have called Narendra a shrutidhara (a person with a prodigious memory).

=== Initial spiritual forays ===
In 1880, Narendra joined Keshab Chandra Sen's Nava Vidhan, which was established by Sen after meeting Ramakrishna Paramahamsa and reconverting from Christianity to Hinduism. Narendra became a member of a Freemasonry lodge "at some point before 1884" and of the Sadharan Brahmo Samaj in his twenties, a breakaway faction of the Brahmo Samaj led by Keshab Chandra Sen and Debendranath Tagore. From 1881 to 1884, he was also active in Sen's Band of Hope, which tried to discourage youths from smoking and drinking.

It was in this cultic milieu that Narendra became acquainted with Western esotericism. His initial beliefs were shaped by Brahmo concepts, which denounced polytheism and caste restrictions, and proposed a "streamlined, rationalized, monotheistic theology strongly coloured by a selective and modernistic reading of the Upanisads and of the Vedanta." Rammohan Roy, the founder of the Brahmo Samaj who was strongly influenced by unitarianism, strove towards a universalistic interpretation of Hinduism. His ideas were "altered [...] considerably" by Debendranath Tagore, who had a romantic approach to the development of these new doctrines, and questioned central Hindu beliefs like reincarnation and karma, and rejected the authority of the Vedas. Tagore, and later Sen, also brought this "neo-Hinduism" closer in line with western esotericism. Sen was influenced by transcendentalism, an American philosophical-religious movement strongly connected with unitarianism, which emphasised personal religious experience over mere reasoning and theology. Sen's focus on creating "an accessible, non-renunciatory, everyman type of spirituality" that introduced "lay systems of spiritual practice" was an influence on the teachings Vivekananda later popularised in the west.

Not satisfied with his knowledge of philosophy, Narendra came to "the question which marked the real beginning of his intellectual quest for God." He asked several prominent Calcutta residents if they had come "face to face with God", but none of their answers satisfied him. At this time, Narendra met Debendranath Tagore (the leader of Brahmo Samaj) and asked if he had seen God. Instead of answering his question, Tagore said, "My boy, you have the Yogi's eyes." According to Banhatti, it was Ramakrishna who first truly answered Narendra's question, by saying "Yes, I see Him as I see you, only in an infinitely intenser sense." De Michelis, however, suggests that Vivekananda was more influenced by the Brahmo Samaj and its new ideas than by Ramakrishna. According to De Michelis, it was Sen's influence that brought Vivekananda fully into contact with western esotericism, and it was via Sen that he met Ramakrishna. Swami Medhananda agrees that the Brahmo Samaj was a formative influence, but affirms that "it was Narendra's momentous encounter with Ramakrishna that changed the course of his life by turning him away from Brahmoism."

=== Meeting Ramakrishna ===
Narendra first met Ramakrishna in 1881. When Narendra's father died in 1884, Ramakrishna became his primary spiritual focus.

Narendra's introduction to Ramakrishna occurred in a literature class at General Assembly's Institution, when Professor William Hastie was lecturing on William Wordsworth's poem, The Excursion. While explaining the word "trance" in the poem, Hastie suggested that his students visit Ramakrishna of Dakshineswar to understand the true meaning of trance. This prompted Narendra, among others in the class, to visit Ramakrishna.

They probably first met personally in November 1881, (Note: The exact date of the meeting is unknown. Vivekananda researcher Shailendra Nath Dhar studied the Calcutta University Calendar of 1881—1882 and found in that year, examination started on 28 November and ended on 2 December) though Narendra did not consider this their first meeting, and neither man mentioned this meeting later. At the time, Narendra was preparing for his upcoming F. A. examination. Ram Chandra Datta accompanied him to Surendra Nath Mitra's house where Ramakrishna had been invited to deliver a lecture. According to Makarand Paranjape, at this meeting Ramakrishna asked Narendra to sing. Impressed by his talent, he asked Narendra to come to Dakshineshwar.

Narendra went to Dakshineswar in late 1881 or early 1882 and met Ramakrishna. This meeting proved to be a turning point in his life. Although he did not initially accept Ramakrishna as his teacher and rebelled against his ideas, he was attracted by his personality and frequently visited him. He initially saw Ramakrishna's ecstasies and visions as "mere figments of imagination" and "hallucinations". As a member of Brahmo Samaj, he opposed idol worship, polytheism, and Ramakrishna's worship of Kali. He even rejected the Advaita Vedanta teaching of "identity with the absolute" as blasphemy and madness, and often ridiculed the idea. Ramakrishna was unperturbed and advised him: "Try to see the truth from all angles".

Narendra's father's sudden death in 1884 left the family bankrupt; creditors began demanding the repayment of loans, and relatives threatened to evict the family from their ancestral home. Once the son of a well-to-do family, Narendra became one of the poorest students in his college. His attempts to find work were unsuccessful. He questioned God's existence, but found solace in Ramakrishna, and his visits to Dakshineswar increased.

One day, Narendra asked Ramakrishna to pray to the goddess Kali for his family's financial welfare. Ramakrishna instead suggested he go to the temple himself and pray. Narendra went to the temple three times, but did not pray for any kind of worldly necessities. He ultimately prayed for true knowledge and devotion from the goddess. He gradually became ready to renounce everything for the sake of realising God, and accepted Ramakrishna as his Guru.

In 1885, Ramakrishna developed throat cancer. He was transferred to Calcutta and then to a garden house in Cossipore. Narendra and Ramakrishna's other disciples took care of him during his last days, and Narendra's spiritual education continued. At Cossipore, he experienced Nirvikalpa samadhi. Narendra and several other disciples received ochre robes from Ramakrishna, forming his first monastic order. He was taught that service to men was the most effective worship of God. Ramakrishna asked him to take care of the other monastic disciples, and likewise asked them to see Narendra as their leader. Ramakrishna died in the early morning hours of 16 August 1886 in Cossipore.

=== Founding of Ramakrishna Math ===
After Ramakrishna's death, support from devotees and admirers diminished. Unpaid rent accumulated, forcing Narendra and the other disciples to look for a new place to live. Many returned home, adopting a Grihastha (family-oriented) way of life. Narendra decided to convert a dilapidated house at Baranagar into a new math (monastery) for the remaining disciples. Rent for the Baranagar Math was low, and was raised by mādhukarī (holy begging). It became the first building of the Ramakrishna Math, the monastery of the monastic order of Ramakrishna. Narendra and other disciples used to spend many hours practicing meditation and religious austerities every day. Narendra recalled the early days of practice in the monastery:

We used to get up at 3:00 am and become absorbed in japa and meditation. What a strong spirit of detachment we had in those days! We had no thought even as to whether the world existed or not.

In 1887, Narendra compiled a Bengali song anthology named Sangeet Kalpataru with Vaishnav Charan Basak. Narendra collected and arranged most of the songs in this compilation, but unfavourable circumstances prevented its completion.

=== Monastic vows ===
In December 1886, the mother of one of the monks, Baburam, invited Narendra and his brother monks to Antpur village. In Antpur, on the Christmas Eve of 1886, the 23 year old Narendra and eight other disciples took formal monastic vows at the Radha Gobinda Jiu temple. They decided to live their lives as their master lived.

== Travels in India (1888–1893) ==
In 1888, Narendra left the monastery as a Parivrâjaka – a wandering monk, "without fixed abode, without ties, independent and strangers wherever they go". His sole possessions were a kamandalu (water pot), staff and his two favourite books: the Bhagavad Gita and The Imitation of Christ. Narendra travelled extensively in India for five years, visiting centres of learning and acquainting himself with diverse religious traditions and social patterns. He developed sympathy for the suffering and poverty of the people, and resolved to uplift the nation. Living primarily on bhiksha (alms), he travelled on foot and by railway. During his travels he met and stayed with Indians from all religions and walks of life: scholars, dewans, rajas, Hindus, Muslims, Christians, paraiyars (low-caste workers) and government officials. On the suggestion of his patron, friend and disciple Raja Ajit Singh of Khetri, he adopted the name "Vivekananda"–a conglomerate of the Sanskrit words: viveka and ānanda, meaning "the bliss of discerning wisdom". As Vivekananda he departed Bombay for Chicago, on 31 May 1893, intending to participate in the World's Parliament of Religions.

== First visit to the West (1893–1897) ==
Vivekananda visited several cities in Japan (including Nagasaki, Kobe, Yokohama, Osaka, Kyoto and Tokyo), China and Canada en route to the United States, reaching Chicago on 30 July 1893. The "Parliament of Religions" took place in September 1893. An initiative of the Swedenborgian layman and Illinois Supreme Court judge Charles C. Bonney, the Congress sought to gather all the religions of the world, with the aim of showing "the substantial unity of many religions in the good deeds of the religious life." The Brahmo Samaj and the Theosophical Society were invited as representative of Hinduism.

Vivekananda wished to participate, but learned that only individuals with credentials from a bona fide organisation would be accepted as delegates. Disappointed, he contacted Professor John Henry Wright of Harvard University, who had invited him to speak at Harvard. Vivekananda wrote of the professor: "He urged upon me the necessity of going to the Parliament of Religions, which he thought would give an introduction to the nation". On hearing that Vivekananda lacked the credentials to speak at the Parliament, Wright said: "To ask for your credentials is like asking the sun to state its right to shine in the heavens". Vivekananda submitted an application introducing himself as a monk "of the oldest order of sannyāsis ... founded by Sankara". The application was supported by the Brahmo Samaj representative Protap Chandra Mozoomdar, who was also a member of the Parliament's selection committee.

=== Parliament of the World's Religions ===
The Parliament of the World's Religions opened on 11 September 1893 at the Art Institute of Chicago, as part of the World's Columbian Exposition. On this day, Vivekananda gave a brief speech representing India and Hinduism. He bowed to Saraswati (the Hindu goddess of learning) and began his speech with "Sisters and brothers of America!". At these words, Vivekananda received a two-minute standing ovation from the crowd of seven thousand. When silence was restored he began his address, greeting the youngest of the nations on behalf of "the most ancient order of monks in the world, the Vedic order of sannyasins, a religion which has taught the world both tolerance and universal acceptance". (Note: McRae quotes "[a] sectarian biography of Vivekananda," namely Sailendra Nath Dhar A Comprehensive Biography of Swami Vivekananda, Part One, (Madras, India: Vivekananda Prakashan Kendra, 1975), p. 461, which "describes his speech on the opening day".) Vivekananda quoted one illustrative passage from the "Shiva mahimna stotram" (Verse 7): "As the different streams having their sources in different places all mingle their water in the sea, so, O Lord, the different paths which men take, through different tendencies, various though they appear, crooked or straight, all lead to Thee!" and another from the Bhagavad Gita (4.11) "Whosoever comes to Me, through whatsoever form, I reach him; all men are struggling through paths that in the end lead to Me." According to Sailendra Nath Dhar, "it was only a short speech, but it voiced the spirit of the Parliament."

Parliament President John Henry Barrows said, "India, the Mother of religions was represented by Swami Vivekananda, the Orange-monk who exercised the most wonderful influence over his auditors". Vivekananda attracted widespread attention in the press, which called him the "cyclonic monk from India". The New York Critique wrote, "He is an orator by divine right, and his strong, intelligent face in its picturesque setting of yellow and orange was hardly less interesting than those earnest words, and the rich, rhythmical utterance he gave them". The New York Herald noted, "Vivekananda is undoubtedly the greatest figure in the Parliament of Religions. After hearing him we feel how foolish it is to send missionaries to this learned nation". American newspapers reported Vivekananda as "the greatest figure in the parliament of religions" and "the most popular and influential man in the parliament". The Boston Evening Transcript reported that Vivekananda was "a great favourite at the parliament... if he merely crosses the platform, he is applauded". He spoke several more times "at receptions, the scientific section, and private homes" on topics related to Hinduism, Buddhism and harmony among religions. Vivekananda's speeches at the Parliament had the common theme of universality, emphasising religious tolerance. He soon became known as a "handsome oriental" and made a huge impression as an orator. Hearing Vivekananda speak, Harvard psychology professor William James said, "that man is simply a wonder for oratorical power. He is an honor to humanity."

=== Lecture tours in the UK and US ===
After the Parliament of Religions, Vivekananda toured many parts of the US as a guest. His popularity gave him an unprecedented opportunity to communicate his views on life and religion to great numbers of people. During a question-answer session at Brooklyn Ethical Society, he remarked, "I have a message to the West as Buddha had a message to the East." On another occasion he described his mission thus:

I do not come to convert you to a new belief. I want you to keep your own belief; I want to make the Methodist a better Methodist; the Presbyterian a better Presbyterian; the Unitarian a better Unitarian. I want to teach you to live the truth, to reveal the light within your own soul.

Vivekananda spent nearly two years lecturing in the eastern and central United States, primarily in Chicago, Detroit, Boston, and New York. He founded the Vedanta Society of New York in 1894. His demanding schedule eventually began to affect his health, and in Spring 1895 he ended his lecture tours and began giving free, private classes in Vedanta and yoga. Beginning in June 1895, he gave private lectures to a dozen of his disciples at Thousand Island Park, New York for two months. Vivekananda was offered academic positions in two American universities (one the chair in Eastern Philosophy at Harvard University and a similar position at Columbia University); he declined both, since his duties would conflict with his commitment as a monk.

Vivekananda travelled to the United Kingdom in 1895 and again in 1896. In November 1895 he met an Irish woman, Margaret Elizabeth Noble, who would become one of his closest disciples, known as Sister Nivedita (a name given her by the Swami, meaning "dedicated to God"). On his second visit, in May 1896, Vivekananda met Max Müller, a noted Indologist from Oxford University who wrote Ramakrishna's first biography in the West. From the UK, he visited other European countries. In Germany, he met Paul Deussen, another renowned Indologist.

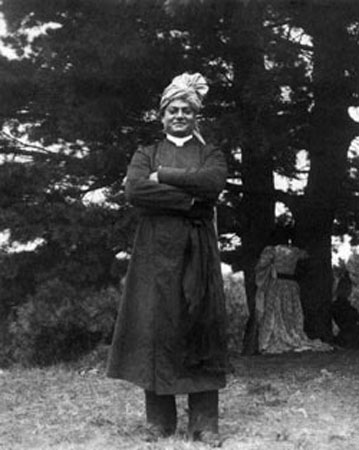
Vivekananda in Greenacre, Maine (August 1894)

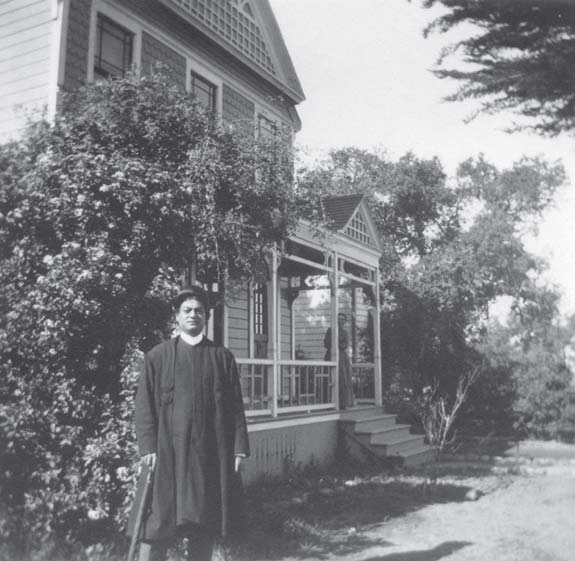
Vivekananda at Mead sisters' house, South Pasadena, in 1900

Vivekananda's success led to a change in mission, namely the establishment of Vedanta centres in the West. He adapted traditional Hindu ideas and religiosity to suit the needs and understandings of his western audiences, who were more familiar with western esoteric traditions and movements. An important element in his adaptation of Hindu religiosity was the introduction of his "four yogas" model, based in Raja yoga, which offered a practical means to realise the divine force within, a central goal of modern western esotericism. In 1896, his book Raja Yoga, an interpretation and adaptation of Patanjali's Yoga Sutras, was published, becoming an instant success; it became highly influential in the western understanding of yoga, in Elizabeth de Michelis's view marking the beginning of modern yoga.

Vivekananda attracted followers and admirers in the US and Europe, including Josephine MacLeod, Betty Leggett, Lady Sandwich, William James, Josiah Royce, Robert G. Ingersoll, Lord Kelvin, Harriet Monroe, Ella Wheeler Wilcox, Sarah Bernhardt, Nikola Tesla, Emma Calvé and Hermann Ludwig Ferdinand von Helmholtz. He initiated several followers, including Marie Louise (a French woman) who became Swami Abhayananda, and Leon Landsberg who became Swami Kripananda, so that they could serve the mission of the Vedanta Society. He also initiated Christina Greenstidel of Detroit, who became Sister Christine, with whom he developed a close father–daughter relationship.

While in America, Vivekananda was given land to establish a retreat for Vedanta students, in the mountains to the southeast of San Jose, California. He called it "Peace retreat", or Shanti Asrama. There were twelve main centres established in America, the largest being the Vedanta Society of Southern California in Hollywood. There is also a Vedanta Press in Hollywood which publishes books about Vedanta and English translations of Hindu scriptures and texts.

From the West, Vivekananda revived his work in India. He regularly corresponded with his followers and brother monks, offering advice and financial support. His letters from this period reflect his campaign of social service, and were strongly worded. He wrote to Akhandananda, "Go from door to door amongst the poor and lower classes of the town of Khetri and teach them religion. Also, let them have oral lessons on geography and such other subjects. No good will come of sitting idle and having princely dishes, and saying "Ramakrishna, O Lord!"—unless you can do some good to the poor". In 1895, Vivekananda founded the periodical Brahmavadin. His translation of the first six chapters of The Imitation of Christ was published in Brahmavadin in 1899. Vivekananda left for India from England on 16 December 1896, accompanied by his disciples Captain and Mrs. Sevier and J.J. Goodwin. On the way, they visited France and Italy, and set sail for India from Naples on 30 December 1896. He was followed to India by Sister Nivedita, who devoted the rest of her life to the education of Indian women and the goal of India's independence.

== Back in India (1897–1899) ==
Vivekananda arrived in Colombo, British Ceylon (now Sri Lanka) on 15 January 1897, and received a warm welcome. In Colombo, he gave his first public speech in the East. He travelled from Colombo to Pamban, Rameswaram, Ramnad, Madurai, Kumbakonam and Madras, delivering lectures. Common people and rajas gave him an enthusiastic reception. During his train travels, people often sat on the rails to force the train to stop, so they could hear him. From Madras (now Chennai), he continued his journey to Calcutta and Almora. While in the West, Vivekananda spoke about India's great spiritual heritage; in India, he repeatedly addressed social issues: uplifting the people, eliminating the caste system, promoting science and industrialisation, addressing widespread poverty, and ending colonial rule. The lectures, published as Lectures from Colombo to Almora, demonstrated his fervent nationalism and spiritual ideology.

On 1 May 1897 in Calcutta, Vivekananda founded the Ramakrishna Mission, an institution dedicated to social service, with ideals based on Karma Yoga. Its governing body consists of the trustees of the Ramakrishna Math (which conducts religious work). Both Ramakrishna Math and Ramakrishna Mission have their headquarters at Belur Math. Vivekananda founded two other monasteries: one in Mayavati in the Himalayas (near Almora), the Advaita Ashrama and another in Madras (now Chennai). Two journals were founded: Prabuddha Bharata in English and Udbhodan in Bengali. That year, famine-relief work was begun by Swami Akhandananda in the Murshidabad district.

Vivekananda earlier inspired Jamsetji Tata to set up a research and educational institution when they travelled together from Yokohama to Chicago on Vivekananda's first visit to the West in 1893. Tata now asked him to head his Research Institute of Science; Vivekananda declined the offer, citing a conflict with his "spiritual interests". He visited Punjab, attempting to mediate an ideological conflict between Arya Samaj (a reformist Hindu movement) and sanatan (orthodox Hindus). After brief visits to Lahore, Delhi and Khetri, Vivekananda returned to Calcutta in January 1898. He consolidated the work of the math and trained disciples for several months. Vivekananda composed "Khandana Bhava–Bandhana", a prayer song dedicated to Ramakrishna, in 1898.

== Second visit to the West and final years (1899–1902) ==
Despite declining health, Vivekananda left for the West for a second time in June 1899. On this occasion, he was accompanied by Sister Nivedita and Swami Turiyananda. After a brief stay in England, he went to the United States where he established Vedanta Societies in San Francisco and New York and founded a shanti ashrama (peace retreat) in California. He travelled to Paris for the Congress of Religions in 1900. His lectures at the Congress concerned the worship of the lingam and the authenticity of the Bhagavad Gita. Vivekananda then visited Brittany, Vienna, Istanbul, Athens and Egypt. The French philosopher Jules Bois was his host for most of this period. Vivekananda returned to Calcutta on 9 December 1900.

After a brief visit to the Advaita Ashrama in Mayavati, Vivekananda settled at Belur Math, where he continued co-ordinating the works of the Ramakrishna Mission, the math, and the initiatives in England and the US. He had many visitors, including royalty and politicians. Due to deteriorating health, Vivekananda was unable to attend the Congress of Religions in Japan in 1901, but he made pilgrimages to Bodhgaya and Varanasi. His health problems, including asthma, diabetes and chronic insomnia, restricted his activity.

== Death ==
On 4 July 1902 (the day of his death), Vivekananda awoke early, went to the monastery at Belur Math and meditated for three hours. He taught Shukla-Yajur-Veda, Sanskrit grammar and the philosophy of yoga to pupils, later discussing with colleagues a planned Vedic college in the Ramakrishna Math. At 7:00 pm Vivekananda went to his room, asking not to be disturbed; he died at 9:20 p.m. while meditating. The rupture of a blood vessel in his brain was reported as a possible cause of death. According to his disciples, the rupture was due to his brahmarandhra (an opening in the crown of his head) being pierced when he attained mahasamādhi. Vivekananda fulfilled his prophecy that he would not live forty years. He was cremated on a sandalwood funeral pyre on the bank of the Ganga in Belur, opposite where Ramakrishna was cremated sixteen years earlier.

== Teachings and philosophy ==
Vivekananda synthesised and popularised various strands of Hindu thought, most notably classical yoga and Advaita Vedanta. As a young man, he had been influenced by western ideas such as Universalism, via Unitarian missionaries who collaborated with the Brahmo Samaj. His initial beliefs were shaped by Brahmo concepts, which included belief in a formless God, the deprecation of idolatry, and, according to Michelis, a "streamlined, rationalized, monotheistic theology strongly coloured by a selective and modernistic reading of the Upanisads and of the Vedanta".

Influenced by Ramakrishna, he came to see the Vedanta as providing the ontological basis for śivajñāne jīver sevā – the spiritual practice of serving human beings as actual manifestations of the divine. For Vivekananda, the practice of remembering the presence of the divine in all people, regardless of social status, promoted social harmony and helped develop the capacity for love.

=== Vedanta and yoga ===
Vivekananda thought that the essence of Hinduism was best expressed in Adi Shankara's Advaita Vedanta philosophy. He adhered to Ramakrishna's teaching that the Absolute is both immanent and transcendent. (Note: According to Michael Taft, Ramakrishna reconciled the dualism of form and formless, regarding the Supreme Being to be both Personal and Impersonal, active and inactive. Ramakrishna: "When I think of the Supreme Being as inactive – neither creating nor preserving nor destroying – I call Him Brahman or Purusha, the Impersonal God. When I think of Him as active – creating, preserving and destroying – I call Him Sakti or Maya or Prakriti, the Personal God. But the distinction between them does not mean a difference. The Personal and Impersonal are the same thing, like milk and its whiteness, the diamond and its lustre, the snake and its wriggling motion. It is impossible to conceive of the one without the other. The Divine Mother and Brahman are one.") According to Anil Sooklal, Vivekananda's neo-Vedanta "reconciles Dvaita or dualism and Advaita or non-dualism," viewing Brahman as "one without a second" yet both saguna (qualified) and nirguna (qualityless). (Note: Sooklalmquoytes Chatterjee: "Sankara's Vedanta is known as Advaita or non-dualism, pure and simple. Hence it is sometimes referred to as Kevala-Advaita or unqualified monism. It may also be called abstract monism in so far as Brahman, the Ultimate Reality, is, according to it, devoid of all qualities and distinctions, nirguna and nirvisesa [...] The Neo-Vedanta is also Advaitic inasmuch as it holds that Brahman, the Ultimate Reality, is one without a second, ekamevadvitiyam. But as distinguished from the traditional Advaita of Sankara, it is a synthetic Vedanta which reconciles Dvaita or dualism and Advaita or non-dualism and also other theories of reality. In this sense it may also be called concrete monism in so far as it holds that Brahman is both qualified, saguna, and qualityless, nirguna (Chatterjee, 1963 : 260).") According to Jackson, the Vedanta acquires a modern and Universalistic form in Vivekananda's summary, showing also the influence of classical yoga:

Each soul is potentially divine. The goal is to manifest this Divinity within by controlling nature, external and internal. Do this either by work, or worship, or mental discipline, or philosophy—by one, or more, or all of these—and be free. This is the whole of religion. Doctrines, or dogmas, or rituals, or books, or temples, or forms, are but secondary details.

Vivekananda's emphasis on nirvikalpa samadhi was preceded by medieval yogic influences on Advaita Vedanta. In line with Advaita Vedanta texts like Dŗg-Dŗśya-Viveka (14th century) and Vedantasara (of Sadananda) (15th century), Vivekananda saw samadhi as a means to attain liberation. (Note: The Advaita Vedanta tradition in medieval times was influenced by, and incorporated elements from, the yogic tradition and texts like the Yoga Vasistha and the Bhagavata Purana. The Yoga Vasistha became an authoritative source text in the Advaita vedanta tradition in the 14th century, while Vidyāraņya's Jivanmuktiviveka (14th century) was influenced by the (Laghu-) Yoga-Vasistha, which in turn was influenced by Kashmir Shaivism.)

An important element in his adaptation of Hindu religiosity was the introduction of his four yogas model, which includes Raja yoga, his interpretation of Patanjali's Yoga Sutras. This offered a practical means to realise the divine force within, a central idea in modern Western esotericism. His book Raja Yoga was highly influential in the Western understanding of yoga.

=== Western esotericism ===
Via his affiliations with Keshub Chandra Sen's Nava Vidhan, the Freemasonry lodge, the Sadharan Brahmo Samaj, and Sen's Band of Hope, Vivekananda became acquainted with Western esotericism. His knowledge of Western esotericism aided his success in Western esoteric circles, beginning with his speech in 1893 at the Parliament of Religions. He adapted traditional Hindu ideas and religiosity to suit the needs and understandings of his Western audiences, particularly those familiar with Western esoteric traditions and movements such as Transcendentalism and New Thought.

Vivekananda's notion of involution was probably influenced by western Theosophists, Darwin's notion of evolution, and possibly also the Samkhya term sātkarya. According to Meera Nanda, "Vivekananda uses the word involution exactly how it appears in Theosophy: the descent, or the involvement, of divine consciousness into matter." Theosophic ideas on involution have "much in common" with "theories of the descent of God in Gnosticism, Kabbalah, and other esoteric schools". With spirit, Vivekananda refers to prana or purusha, derived from Samkhya and classical yoga as presented by Patanjali in the Yoga Sutras.

=== Moral and social philosophy ===
Vivekananda linked morality with control of the mind, seeing truth, purity and unselfishness as traits which strengthened it. He advised his followers to be holy, unselfish and to have shraddhā (faith). Vivekananda supported brahmacharya, believing it the source of his physical and mental stamina and eloquence.

Nationalism was a prominent theme in Vivekananda's thought. He believed that a country's future depends on its people, and his teachings focused on human development. He wanted "to set in motion a machinery which will bring noblest ideas to the doorstep of even the poorest and the meanest".

== Influence and legacy ==
Swami Vivekananda was one of the most influential philosophers and social reformers in his contemporary India. He is considered to be the most successful and influential missionary of Vedanta to the Western world.

=== Neo-Vedanta ===
Vivekananda is considered to be a representative of Neo-Vedanta – a modern interpretation of certain aspects of Hinduism that are thought to be compatible with western esoteric traditions, such as Transcendentalism, New Thought and Theosophy. His reinterpretation created a new understanding and appreciation of Hinduism inside and outside India, and paved the way for the enthusiastic reception of other forms of Indian spiritual self-improvement in the West, such as yoga and Transcendental Meditation. According to Agehananda Bharati: "...modern Hindus derive their knowledge of Hinduism from Vivekananda, directly or indirectly". Vivekananda espoused the idea that all sects within Hinduism (and all religions) are different paths to the same goal.

However, more recent scholarship advises caution against presenting Vivekananda as a Neo-Vedantin, as it could overstate the innovativeness of his theology. James Madaio observes that features often attributed to Vivekananda's Neo-Vedanta, such as the reduced centrality of scripture and emphasis on direct spiritual experience, are already present in medieval Advaitic literature such as the Vivekacūḍāmaṇi (VCM 59, 474).

=== Indian nationalism ===
Vivekananda's nationalism gave unprecedented substance to the emerging nationalist ideal of British-ruled India. According to social reformer Charles Freer Andrews, "The Swami's intrepid patriotism gave a new colour to the national movement throughout India. More than any other single individual of that period Vivekananda had made his contribution to the new awakening of India". Vivekananda drew attention to the extent of poverty in the country, and maintained that addressing such poverty was a prerequisite for national awakening. His nationalistic ideas influenced many Indian thinkers and leaders. Sri Aurobindo regarded Vivekananda as the one who awakened India spiritually. Mahatma Gandhi counted him among the few Hindu reformers "who have maintained this Hindu religion in a state of splendor by cutting down the dead wood of tradition".

=== Name-giving ===
In September 2010, the then Union Finance Minister Pranab Mukherjee, who later became President of India, approved in principle the Swami Vivekananda Values Education Project at a cost of ₹1 billion (US$10 million). The project's objectives included publishing Vivekananda's works in a number of languages, and involving youth with competitions, essays, discussions and study circles. In 2011, the West Bengal Police Training College was renamed the Swami Vivekananda State Police Academy, West Bengal. The state technical university in Chhattisgarh has been named the Chhattisgarh Swami Vivekanand Technical University. In 2012, the Raipur airport was renamed Swami Vivekananda Airport. The Vivek Express train of Indian Railways is also named after Vivekananda.

=== Celebrations ===
National Youth Day in India is observed on Vivekananda's birthday (12 January). The 150th birth anniversary of Swami Vivekananda was celebrated in India and abroad. The Ministry of Youth Affairs and Sports in India, officially observed 2013 as the occasion in a declaration. The Vivek Express services of the Indian Railways was launched in 2013 to commemorate the 150th birth anniversary.

The day he delivered his speech at the Parliament of Religions (11 September) is also observed as "World Brotherhood Day".

=== Films ===
Indian film director Utpal Sinha's 2013, The Light: Swami Vivekananda, was a tribute for his 150th birth anniversary. Other Indian films about his life include: Swamiji (1949) by Amar Mullick, Swami Vivekananda (1955) by Amar Mullick, Birieswar Vivekananda (1964) by Modhu Bose, Life and Message of Swami Vivekananda (1964) documentary film by Bimal Roy, Swami Vivekananda (1998) by G. V. Iyer, Swamiji (2012) laser light film by Manick Sorcar. Sound of Joy, an Indian 3D-animated short film directed by Sukankan Roy depicts the spiritual journey of Vivekananda. It won the National Film Award for Best Non-Feature Animation Film in 2014.

== Works ==
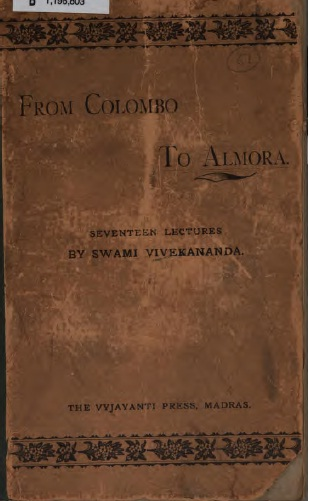
Lectures from Colombo to Almora front cover 1897 edition

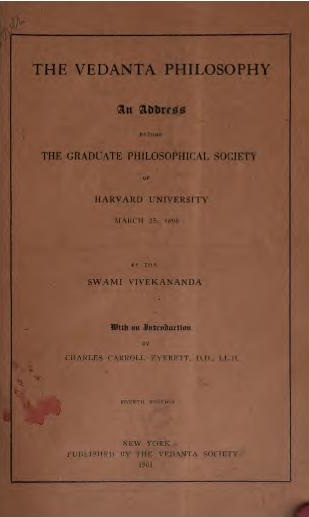
Vedanta Philosophy An address before the Graduate Philosophical Society 1901 cover page

Although Vivekananda was a powerful writer in English and Bengali, most of his published works were based on lectures given at various places around the world. Since most of these lectures were delivered spontaneously and with minimal preparation, his written style often retained the variability characteristic of his speech, and could be "in turn discursive or expository, conversational or declamatory." His main work, Raja Yoga, consists of his own reworking of a series of talks delivered in New York.

Bartaman Bharat, meaning "Present-day India", is a Bengali-language essay, first published in the March 1899 issue of Udbodhan, the Bengali-language magazine of Ramakrishna Math and Ramakrishna Mission. The essay was reprinted as a book in 1905 and later included in the fourth volume of The Complete Works of Swami Vivekananda. In this essay, Vivekananda's refrain to the readers is to honour every Indian as a brother, regardless of poverty, social status or caste.

=== Publications ===
Published in his lifetime

- Sangeet Kalpataru (1887, with Vaishnav Charan Basak)
- Karma Yoga (1896)
- Raja Yoga (1896 [1899 edition])
- Vedanta Philosophy: An address before the Graduate Philosophical Society (1896)
- Lectures from Colombo to Almora (1897)
- Bartaman Bharat (in Bengali) (March 1899), Udbodhan
- My Master (1901), The Baker and Taylor Company, New York
- Vedânta philosophy: lectures on Jnâna Yoga (1902) Vedânta Society, New York OCLC 919769260
- Jnana yoga (1899)

Published after his death (1902)

- Addresses on Bhakti Yoga
- Bhakti Yoga
- The East and the West (1909)
- Inspired Talks (1909)
- Narada Bhakti Sutras – translation
- Para Bhakti or Supreme Devotion
- Practical Vedanta
- Speeches and writings of Swami Vivekananda; a comprehensive collection
- Complete Works: a collection of his writings, lectures and discourses in a set of nine volumes
- Seeing Beyond the Circle (2005)

== Sources ==
- Adiswarananda, Swami, ed. (2006), Vivekananda, world teacher: his teachings on the spiritual unity of humankind, Woodstock, Vermont: SkyLight Paths Pub, ISBN 1-59473-210-8
- Arrington, Robert L.; Chakrabarti, Tapan Kumar (2001), "Swami Vivekananda", A Companion to the Philosophers, Blackwell Publishing, ISBN 978-0-631-22967-4
- Arora, V. K. (1968), "Communion with Brahmo Samaj", The social and political philosophy of Swami Vivekananda, Punthi Pustak
- Badrinath, Chaturvedi (2006). Swami Vivekananda, the Living Vedanta. Penguin Books India. ISBN 978-0-14-306209-7.
- Banhatti, G.S. (1995), Life and Philosophy of Swami Vivekananda, Atlantic Publishers & Distributors, ISBN 978-81-7156-291-6
- Banhatti, G.S. (1963), The Quintessence of Vivekananda, Pune, India: Suvichar Prakashan Mandal, OCLC 1048955252
- Bharathi, K.S. (1998b), Encyclopaedia of eminent thinkers, vol. 8, New Delhi: Concept Publishing Company, ISBN 978-81-7022-709-0
- Bhide, Nivedita Raghunath (2008), Swami Vivekananda in America, Vivekananda Kendra, ISBN 978-81-89248-22-2
- Bhuyan, P. R. (2003), Swami Vivekananda: Messiah of Resurgent India, New Delhi: Atlantic Publishers & Distributors, ISBN 978-81-269-0234-7
- Burke, Marie Louise (1958), Swami Vivekananda in America: New Discoveries, Kolkata: Advaita Ashrama, ISBN 978-0-902479-99-9
- Burke, Marie Louise (1985), Swami Vivekananda in the West: New Discoveries (in six volumes) (3rd ed.), Kolkata: Advaita Ashrama, ISBN 978-0-87481-219-0
- Chattopadhyaya, Rajagopal (1999), Swami Vivekananda in India: A Corrective Biography, Motilal Banarsidass, ISBN 978-81-208-1586-5
- Chetananda, Swami (1997). God lived with them: life stories of sixteen monastic disciples of Sri Ramakrishna. St. Louis, Missouri: Vedanta Society of St. Louis. ISBN 0-916356-80-9.
- Clarke, Peter Bernard (2006), New Religions in Global Perspective, Routledge
- Comans, Michael (1993), The Question of the Importance of Samadhi in Modern and Classical Advaita Vedanta. In: Philosophy East and West Vol. 43, No. 1 (January 1993), pp. 19-38.
- Dalal, Roshen (October 2011). Hinduism: An Alphabetical Guide. Penguin Books India. ISBN 978-0-14-341421-6.
- Das, Sisir Kumar (1991), A History of Indian Literature: 1800–1910, Western impact : Indian response, Sahitya Akademi, ISBN 978-81-7201-006-5
- Von Dense, Christian D. (1999), Philosophers and Religious Leaders, Greenwood Publishing Group
- Dhar, Shailendra Nath (1976), A Comprehensive Biography of Swami Vivekananda (2nd ed.), Madras, India: Vivekananda Prakashan Kendra, OCLC 708330405
- Dutta, Krishna (2003), Calcutta: a cultural and literary history, Oxford: Signal Books, ISBN 978-1-56656-721-3
- Dutt, Harshavardhan (2005), Immortal Speeches, New Delhi: Unicorn Books, p. 121, ISBN 978-81-7806-093-4
- Farquhar, J. N. (1915), Modern Religious Movements in India, London: Macmillan
- Flood, Gavin D. (1996), An Introduction to Hinduism, Cambridge University Press
- Ganguly, Adwaita P. (2001), Life and Times of Netaji Subhas: From Cuttack to Cambridge, 1897–1921, VRC Publications, ISBN 978-81-87530-02-2
- Feuerstein, Georg (2002), The Yoga Tradition, Delhi: Motilal Banarsidass
- Ghosh, Gautam (2003). The Prophet of Modern India: A Biography of Swami Vivekananda. Rupa & Company. ISBN 978-81-291-0149-5.
- Gosling, David L. (2007). Science and the Indian Tradition: When Einstein Met Tagore. Routledge. ISBN 978-1-134-14333-7.
- Gupta, Raj Kumar (1986), The Great Encounter: A Study of Indo-American Literary and Cultural Relations, Delhi: Abhinav Publications, ISBN 978-81-7017-211-6
- Halbfass, Wilhelm (1995), Philology and Confrontation: Paul Hacker on Traditional and Modern Vedānta, SUNY Press
- Heehs, Peter (2020), "Sri Aurobindo's Theory of Spiritual Evolution", in Mackenzie Brown, C. (ed.), Asian Religious Responses to Darwinism: Evolutionary Theories in Middle Eastern, South Asian, and East Asian Cultural Contexts, Springer Nature
- Houghton, Walter Raleigh, ed. (1893), The parliament of religions and religious congresses at the World's Columbian exposition (3rd ed.), Frank Tennyson Neely, OL 14030155M
- Isherwood, Christopher (1976), Meditation and Its Methods According to Swami Vivekananda, Hollywood, California: Vedanta Press, ISBN 978-0-87481-030-1
- Isherwood, Christopher; Adjemian, Robert (1987), "On Swami Vivekananda", The Wishing Tree, Hollywood, California: Vedanta Press, ISBN 978-0-06-250402-9
- Jackson, Carl T (1994), "The Founders", Vedanta for the West: the Ramakrishna movement in the United States, Indianapolis, Indiana: Indiana University Press, ISBN 978-0-253-33098-7
- Kashyap, Shivendra (2012), Saving Humanity: Swami Vivekanand Perspective, Vivekanand Swadhyay Mandal, ISBN 978-81-923019-0-7
- Kapur, Devesh (2010), Diaspora, development, and democracy: the domestic impact of international migration from India, Princeton, New Jersey: Princeton University Press, ISBN 978-0-691-12538-1
- Kattackal, Jacob (1982), Religion and ethics in Advaita, Kottayam, Kerala: St. Thomas Apostolic Seminary, ISBN 978-3-451-27922-5
- Kearney, Richard (13 August 2013). Anatheism: Returning to God After God. Columbia University Press. ISBN 978-0-231-51986-1.
- King, Richard (2002), Orientalism and Religion: Post-Colonial Theory, India and "The Mystic East", Routledge
- Kipf, David (1979), The Brahmo Samaj and the shaping of the modern Indian mind, Atlantic Publishers & Distri
- Kishore, B. R. (2001). Swami Vivekanand. Diamond Pocket Books. ISBN 978-81-7182-952-1.
- Kraemer, Hendrik (1960), "Cultural response of Hindu India", World cultures and world religions, London: Westminster Press, ASIN B0007DLYAK
- Madaio, James (2017), "Rethinking Neo-Vedānta: Swami Vivekananda and the Selective Historiography of Advaita Vedānta", Religions, 8 (6): 101, doi:10.3390/rel8060101
- Maharaj, Ayon (2020). "Śivajñāne jīver sevā: Reexamining Swami Vivekananda's Practical Vedānta in the Light of Sri Ramakrishna". Journal of Dharma Studies. 2 (2): 175–187. doi:10.1007/s42240-019-00046-x. S2CID 202387300.
- Majumdar, Ramesh Chandra (1963), Swami Vivekananda Centenary Memorial Volume, Kolkata: Swami Vivekananda Centenary, p. 577, ASIN B0007J2FTS
- Malagi, R.A.; Naik, M.K. (2003), "Stirred Spirit: The Prose of Swami Vivekananda", Perspectives on Indian Prose in English, New Delhi: Abhinav Publications, ISBN 978-81-7017-150-8
- McRae, John R. (1991), "Oriental Verities on the American Frontier: The 1893 World's Parliament of Religions and the Thought of Masao Abe", Buddhist-Christian Studies, 11, University of Hawai'i Press: 7–36, doi:10.2307/1390252, JSTOR 1390252
- Medhananda, Swami (2022). Swami Vivekananda's Vedāntic Cosmopolitanism. Oxford University Press. ISBN 978-0-19-762446-3.
- Michelis, Elizabeth De (2004), A History of Modern Yoga: Patanjali and Western Esotericism, Continuum, ISBN 978-0-8264-8772-8
- De Michelis, Elizabeth (8 December 2005). A History of Modern Yoga: Patanjali and Western Esotericism. Continuum. ISBN 978-0-8264-8772-8.
- Miller, Timothy (1995), "The Vedanta Movement and Self-Realization fellowship", America's Alternative Religions, Albany, New York: SUNY Press, ISBN 978-0-7914-2398-1
- Minor, Robert Neil (1986), "Swami Vivekananda's use of the Bhagavad Gita", Modern Indian Interpreters of the Bhagavad Gita, Albany, New York: SUNY Press, ISBN 978-0-88706-297-1
- Mittra, Sitansu Sekhar (2001). Bengal's Renaissance. Academic Publishers. ISBN 978-81-87504-18-4.
- Mohapatra, Amulya Ranjan (2009). Swaraj - Thoughts of Gandhi, Tilak, Aurobindo, Raja Rammohun Roy, Tagore & Vivekananda. Readworthy. ISBN 978-81-89973-82-7.
- Mukherji, Mani Shankar (2011), The Monk As Man: The Unknown Life of Swami Vivekananda, Penguin Books India, ISBN 978-0-14-310119-2
- Nanda, Meera (2010), "Madame Blavatsky's Children: Modern Hindu Encounters with Darwinism", in Lewis, James R.; Hammer, Olav (eds.), Handbook of Religion and the Authority of Science, BRILL
- Nikhilananda, Swami (April 1964), "Swami Vivekananda Centenary", Philosophy East and West, 14 (1), University of Hawai'i Press: 73–75, doi:10.2307/1396757, JSTOR 1396757
- Nikhilananda, Swami (1953), Vivekananda: A Biography (PDF), New York: Ramakrishna-Vivekananda Center, ISBN 0-911206-25-6
- Pangborn, Cyrus R.; Smith, Bardwell L. (1976), "The Ramakrishna Math and Mission", Hinduism: New Essays in the History of Religions, Brill Archive
- Paranjape, Makarand (2005), Penguin Swami Vivekananda Reader, Penguin India, ISBN 0-14-303254-2
- Paranjape, Makarand R. (2012). Making India: Colonialism, National Culture, and the Afterlife of Indian English Authority. Springer. ISBN 978-94-007-4661-9.
- Parel, Anthony (2000), Gandhi, Freedom, and Self-Rule, Lexington Books, ISBN 978-0-7391-0137-7
- Paul, Dr S. (2003). Great Men Of India : Swami Vivekananda. Sterling Publishers Pvt. Ltd. ISBN 978-81-207-9138-1.
- Piazza, Paul (1978). Christopher Isherwood: Myth and Anti-Myth. Columbia University Press. ISBN 978-0-231-51358-6.
- Prabhananda, Swami (June 2003), "Profiles of famous educators: Swami Vivekananda" (PDF), Prospects, XXXIII (2), Netherlands: Springer: 231–245, doi:10.1023/A:1023603115703, S2CID 162659685, archived from the original (PDF) on 10 October 2008
- Rambachan, Anantanand (1994), The limits of scripture: Vivekananda's reinterpretation of the Vedas, Honolulu, Hawaii: University of Hawaii Press, ISBN 978-0-8248-1542-4
- Richards, Glyn (1996), "Vivekananda", A Source-Book of Modern Hinduism, Routledge, pp. 77–78, ISBN 978-0-7007-0317-3
- Rinehart, Robin (1 January 2004). Contemporary Hinduism: Ritual, Culture, and Practice. ABC-CLIO. ISBN 978-1-57607-905-8.
- Rolland, Romain (1929a), "Naren the Beloved Disciple", The Life of Ramakrishna, Hollywood, California: Vedanta Press, pp. 169–193, ISBN 978-81-85301-44-0
- Rolland, Romain (1929b), "The River Re-Enters the Sea", The Life of Ramakrishna, Hollywood, California: Vedanta Press, pp. 201–214, ISBN 978-81-85301-44-0
- Rolland, Romain (2008), The Life of Vivekananda and the Universal Gospel (24th ed.), Advaita Ashrama, p. 328, ISBN 978-81-85301-01-3
- Seifer, Marc (2001), Wizard: The Life and Times of Nikola Tesla : Biography of a Genius, Citadel, ISBN 978-0-8065-1960-9
- Sen, Amiya (2003), Gupta, Narayani (ed.), Swami Vivekananda, New Delhi: Oxford University Press, ISBN 0-19-564565-0
- Sen, Amiya (2006), Indispensable Vivekananda: anthology for our times, Orient Blackswan, ISBN 978-81-7824-130-2
- Sharma, Arvind (1988), "Swami Vivekananda's Experiences", Neo-Hindu Views of Christianity, Leiden, The Netherlands: Brill, ISBN 978-90-04-08791-0
- Sharma, Benishankar (1963), Swami Vivekananda: A Forgotten Chapter of His Life, Kolkata: Oxford Book & Stationary Co., ASIN B0007JR46C
- Shattuck, Cybelle T. (1999), "The modern period ii: forces of change", Hinduism, London: Routledge, ISBN 978-0-415-21163-5
- Sheean, Vincent (2005), "Forerunners of Gandhi", Lead, Kindly Light: Gandhi and the Way to Peace, Kessinger Publishing, ISBN 978-1-4179-9383-3
- Shetty, B. Vithal (2009), World as seen under the lens of a scientist, Bloomington, Indiana: Xlibris Corporation, ISBN 978-1-4415-0471-5
- Sil, Narasingha Prosad (1997), Swami Vivekananda: A Reassessment, Selinsgrove, Pennsylvania: Susquehanna University Press, ISBN 0-945636-97-0
- Sooklal, Anil (1993), "The Neo-Vedanta Philosophy of Swami Vivekananda", Nidan, 5
- Taft, Michael (2014), Nondualism: A Brief History of a Timeless Concept, Cephalopod Rex
- Thomas, Abraham Vazhayil (1974), Christians in Secular India, Madison, New Jersey: Fairleigh Dickinson University Press, ISBN 978-0-8386-1021-3
- Thomas, Wendell (1 August 2003). Hinduism Invades America 1930. Kessinger Publishing. ISBN 978-0-7661-8013-0.
- Urban, Hugh B. (1 January 2007). Tantra: Sex, Secrecy, Politics and Power in the Study of Religion. Motilal Banarsidass Publisher. ISBN 978-81-208-2932-9.
- Virajananda, Swami, ed. (2006) [1910], The Life of the swami Vivekananda by his eastern and western disciples... in two volumes (6th ed.), Kolkata: Advaita Ashrama, ISBN 81-7505-044-6
- Virajananda, Swami (1918), The Life of the Swami Vivekananda, vol. 4, Prabuddha Bharata Office, Advaita Ashrama
- Vivekananda, Swami (2001) [1907], Complete Works of Swami Vivekananda, vol. 9 Volumes, Advaita Ashrama, ISBN 978-81-85301-75-4
- Vivekananda, Swami (1996), Swami Lokeswarananda (ed.), My India : the India eternal (1st ed.), Calcutta: Ramakrishna Mission Institute of Culture, pp. 1–2, ISBN 81-85843-51-1
- Vrajaprana, Pravrajika (1996). A portrait of Sister Christine. Calcutta: Ramakrishna Mission Institute of Culture. ISBN 978-81-85843-80-3.
- Wuthnow, Robert (1 July 2011). America and the Challenges of Religious Diversity. Princeton University Press. ISBN 978-1-4008-3724-3.
- Wolffe, John (2004). Religion in History: Conflict, Conversion and Coexistence. Manchester University Press. ISBN 978-0-7190-7107-2.
