= Sister Christine =

German-American social worker in India (1866–1930)

- Christine Greensfield
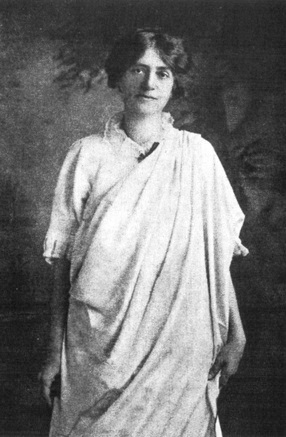
- Sister Christine
- Born: Christina Greenstidel; 17 August 1866; Nuremberg, Germany
- Died: 27 March 1930 (aged 63); New York, United States
- Other names: Bhagini Christine
- Citizenship: United States
- Occupation: Teacher
- Known for: Social work in India

Sister Christine or Christina Greenstidel (17 August 1866 – 27 March 1930) was a school teacher, and close friend and disciple of Swami Vivekananda. On 24 February 1894, Christine attended a lecture of Vivekananda in Detroit, United States which inspired her. She started communicating with Vivekananda through letters. Christine went to India in 1902 and began working as a school teacher and a social worker.

In 1911, after the death of Vivekananda's disciple Sister Nivedita, Christine took charge of Nivedita's girls' school. Some scholars of Vivekananda's life, including Sister Gargi and Pravrajika Vrajaprana, believe that Vivekananda regarded Christine as his daughter.

== Early life and career ==
Sister Christine was born as Christina Greenstidel on 17 August 1866, in Nuremberg, Germany. She was a Lutheran who later became a Christian Scientist. She had five younger sisters. When Christine was three years old, her family moved to the United States and settled in Detroit, Michigan. Christine's father was a German scholar, but the family lacked financial resources. She was seventeen years old when her father died, and she became the sole breadwinner of the family, obtaining a job as a teacher in the Detroit Public School system in 1883.

== Religious apprenticeship in the United States ==
=== Lectures in Detroit ===
In 1894, Christine was attending a series of lectures in Detroit with her friend Mary Funke. Swami Vivekananda was in Detroit early that year for six weeks; he delivered several lectures while there. On 24 February 1894, Christine attended a lecture by Vivekananda. She was so impressed by Vivekananda that she attended many more of his lectures and became an admirer and disciple. She later recounted her experience of that first lecture:

Never have I heard such a voice, so flexible, so sonorous. It was the voice of God to me! That range of emotion, that silvery music—I have never heard in any other. It was sheer music...
It was the mind that made the first great appeal, that amazing mind! What can one say that will give even a faint idea of its majesty, its splendour? It was a mind so far transcending other minds, even of those who rank as geniuses... Its ideas were so clear, so powerful, so transcendental that it seemed incredible that they could have emanated from the intellect of a limited human being.

Christine also said that she started loving India after attending Vivekananda's lectures:

Our love for India came to birth, I think, when we first heard [Swami Vivekananda] say the word, "India", in that marvellous voice of his. It seems incredible that so much could have been put into one small word of five letters. There was love, passion, pride, longing, adoration, tragedy, chivalry, heimweh, (Note: "Heimweh" is a German word roughly equivalent to "homesickness". See Heimweh for details.) and again love. Whole volumes could not have produced such a feeling in others. It had the magic power of creating love in those who heard it. Ever after, India became the land of heart's desire.

=== Meeting at Thousand Island Park ===
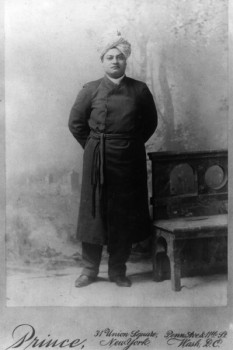
Swami Vivekananda in New York in 1895. That year, he initiated Sister Christine into Brahmacharya at Thousand Island Park.

After Vivekananda left Detroit, contact between him and the two young women ceased for a time. In July 1895, Christine and Funke decided to travel to Thousand Island Park in Northern New York State to meet Vivekananda; he was staying there and teaching a group of his disciples. During the journey, they were caught in a rainstorm and finally reached Thousand Island Park at night, "wet, bedraggled and totally unexpected." Vivekananda warmly welcomed them. Funke later recalled the incident saying, "He greeted us so sweetly, it was like a benediction." Vivekananda invited them to stay there for a few days and attend his lectures. The two young women at once accepted the invitation. Vivekananda told others that two of his disciples had travelled hundreds of miles to find him. They were to stay from 20 July to 9 August 1895; during that time they attended 18 lectures.

==== Religious initiation ====
When Christine and Funke attended the first Saturday lecture, they learned that Vivekananda was initiating some of his disciples. The next Sunday afternoon, Vivekananda told Christine that he did not know Christine well enough to feel sure if she was ready for initiation. He then added that he possessed a power which he used very rarely—the power of reading someone's mind. He asked Christine's permission to read her mind to get to know if she was mentally prepared for initiation. Christine assented and after he starting to read her mind Vivekananda asked her again: "May I read all?" Christine again assented. On the following day he initiated her. Vivekananda gave Christine a mantra and made her his disciple. Christine later said that Vivekananda was apparently satisfied after reading her mind.

==== Vows of Brahmacharya ====
During the lectures, Christine became one of the chosen and favourite students of Vivekananda. He gave five disciples vows of Brahmacharya (lifelong celibacy), and Christine was one of them. Vivekananda dedicated her to the Divine Mother and reserved her for his Indian works. Christine and Funke continued to attend Vivekananda's lectures until he left for New York on 7 August 1895.

=== Relationship with Vivekananda ===
Swamiji was in constant touch with Christine. Some scholars of Vivekananda's life, including Sister Gargi and Pravrajika Vrajaprana, believe that Vivekananda regarded Christine as his daughter. He had written in one of his letters to her, when he announced his plan to visit London, "It will be such a pleasure to see you" and closed with the blessing, "Mother knows best. I dedicate you to her forever. What more can I do? This is the highest, the best, and loveliest." She was there to receive him when he arrived at the harbour aboard the ship S.S. Golconda. She also met for the first time Sister Nivedita who had also traveled with Vivekananda. After two weeks in London, he and Christine went to Detroit, a journey described by Christine as a blessing of "ten inspiring days in his presence." He stayed with her family for five days. In the later part of the 1890s, she helped in the administrative functions of the Vedanta Society in Detroit.

After his return to India, he continued his correspondence with Christine, even composing a nursery rhyme for her. Soon thereafter, Christine's mother died and she decided to move to India.

== Life in India ==
=== Arrival ===
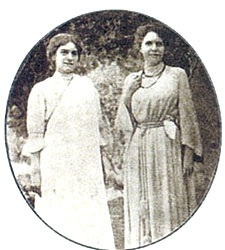
Sister Christine (left) with Sister Nivedita (right) in India

On 7 April 1902, Christine arrived in Kolkata, India. On the next morning she went to Belur Math to meet Vivekananda where she spent the entire day with him. According to the notes of Swami Brahmananda's notebook, Christine started visiting Belur frequently and came to the Math on 18, 23, 25, 26 April and 1, 4 May and stayed for the entire day each time.

=== Travel to Mayavati ===
In the summer, as the weather of Kolkata became very warm and dry, Vivekananda decided to send his Western women disciples to Mayavti. Vivekananda initially planned to travel with his disciples and visit the Himalayas, but, the plan was changed later. Sister Nivedita wrote in a letter to Josephine MacLeod, dated 19 April—

Christine and I are staying on here till May the 1st, but Swami is not coming to us, as I had thought he would... we [Christine and Nivedita] may come to Mayavati together... I feel that is very possibly her destiny to remain in the Himalayas a year or so — meditating. I should think that to be her power.

On 5 May 1902, Sister Christine and Sister Nivedita started their journey to Mayavati. Vivekananda paid ₹ 150 for their travel expenses. They reached Mayavati on 10 May, where they were cordially welcomed by Mrs. Sevier. They started staying with Vivekananda's disciples of Mayavati.

=== Death of Swami Vivekananda ===
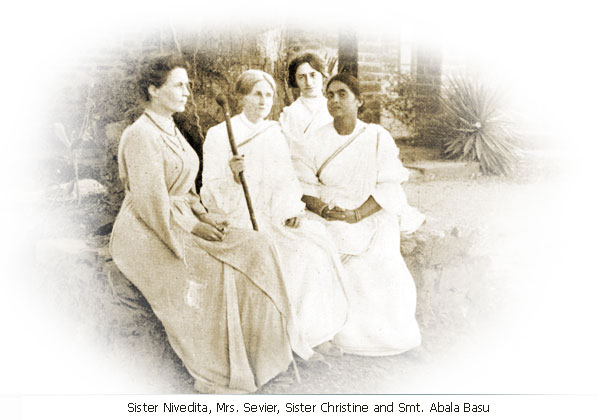
Sister Nivedita, Sister Christine, Charlotte Sevier, and Lady Abala Bose in Mayavati

Nivedita returned to Kolkata in mid-June, as works in her school had already started. Swami Vivekananda died at Belur Math on 4 July 1902. He wrote his last letter to Christine on 21 June (1902). In the second week of July, Christine received Nivedita's letter—

Tomorrow you will receive this news that will desolate your life. I can only tell Dear, that if my presence could keep you there, you were never absent from his side on Saturday ... Death came to him so beautifully on Friday night! A half hour's sleep after meditation, and he was gone!

After the death of Vivekananda on 4 July 1902, she came back to Kolkata. She lived in a house of Bosepara Lane, and joined the school run by Sister Nivedita as a teacher. She also helped older women. Christine remained in India until she returned to the U.S. in 1914.

In 1924, she returned to India but found that life on Bosepara Lane had changed in her absence and the house where she had lived a decade before had collapsed. Christine went to the school, hoping to rejoin it as a teacher, but the school authorities rejected her request. She stayed with Basiswar Sen the eminent scientist and agriculturist, first in his house in 8, Bosepara Lane and then in Kundan House in Almora. She lived on an annual allowance of 500 dollars provided by Josephine MacLeod. Boshi Sen used to call Christine his mother, and Christine used to treat Boshi as her spiritual child. She had given her only treasures, rosary and letters to Swami Vivekananda to Boshi. In Almora she delved deeper into Raja Yoga, which Swami Vivekananda had asked her to follow.

She stayed in India until March 1928, when she decided to go back to the U.S. because of deteriorating health. She stayed in Detroit for some time and then moved to New York. In New York, she fell seriously ill and was admitted to a nursing home of her friend, where she died on 27 March 1930.
