= Bibliography of Swami Vivekananda =

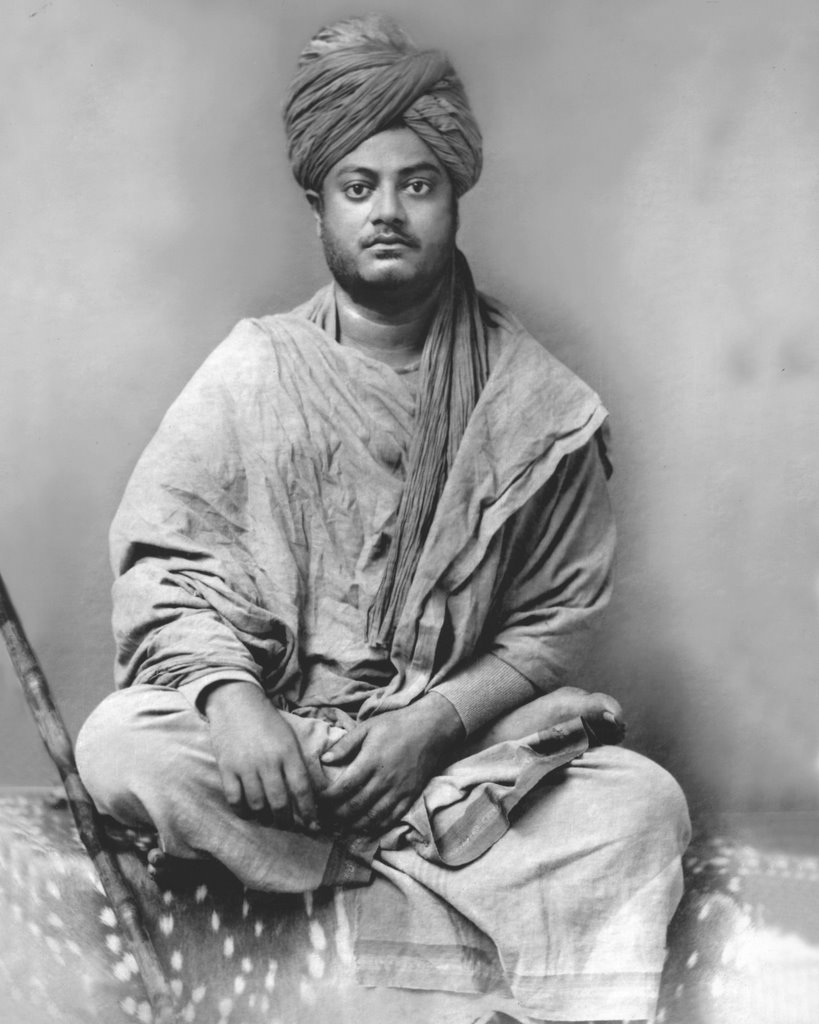
Swami Vivekananda

Swami Vivekananda (1863–1902) was an Indian Hindu monk and a key figure in the introduction of Indian philosophies of Vedanta and Yoga to the western world. He was one of the most influential philosophers and social reformers in his contemporary India and the most successful and influential missionaries of Vedanta to the Western world. Indian Nobel laureate poet Rabindranath Tagore's suggested to study the works of Vivekananda to understand India. He also told, in Vivekananda there was nothing negative, but everything positive.

In last one century, hundreds of scholarly books have been written on Vivekananda, his works and his philosophy in different languages. Sister Nivedita, who was a disciple and a friend of Vivekananda, wrote two books The Master as I Saw Him and Notes of some wanderings with the Swami Vivekananda. The first one was published in 1910 and the second one was published in 1913. Sister Gargi's lifelong research work, a series of six volumes of books, Swami Vivekananda in the West: New Discoveries was first published in two volumes in 1957. In 1983–87, these series was republished in six volumes. Bengali scholar and critic Sankari Prasad Basu, who was a director of Swami Vivekananda Archives, Ramakrishna Mission Institute of Culture wrote several books on Vivekananda such as Vivekananda o Samakalin Bharatbarsha ((in Bengali) 7 volumes), Sahasya Vivekananda (in Bengali), Bandhu Vivekananda (in Bengali), etc.

Monks of Ramakrishna Math and Mission too have written several notable books on the life and works of Vivekananda. Swami Vivekananda and Modern India written by Swami Jagadiswarananda was first published in 1941. In this book, the author covered the biography of Vivekananda in brief. Swami Nikhilananda wrote Vivekananda: A Biography which was first published in 1943 from Advaita Ashrama. Yuganayak Vivekananda (in Bengali), written by Swami Gambhirananda was first published in 1966–1967.

== Books ==
Published in his lifetime

- Karma Yoga (1896)
- Raja Yoga (1896)
- Vedanta Philosophy: An address before the Graduate Philosophical Society (first published 1896)
- Lectures from Colombo to Almora (1897)
- Vedanta philosophy: lectures on Jnana Yoga (1902)

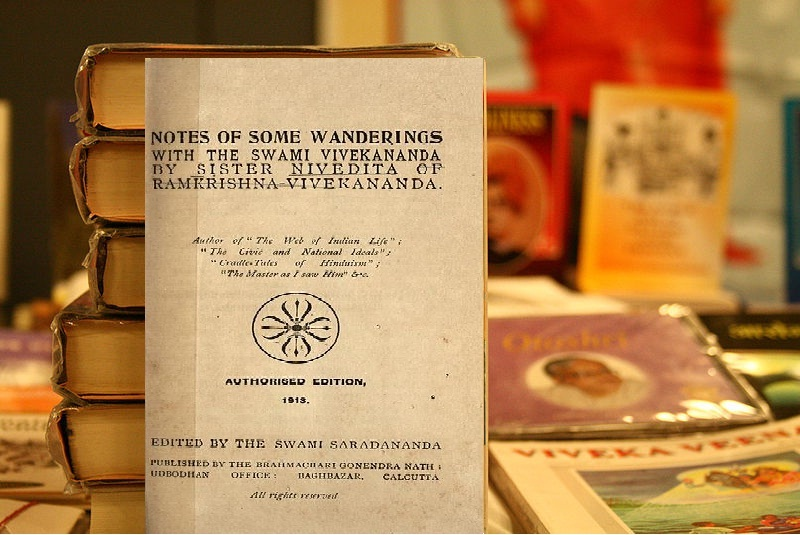
Title page of Notes of some wanderings with the Swami Vivekananda, with other works in the background

Published posthumously

Here is a list of selected books of Swami Vivekananda published after his death (1902)

- Addresses on Bhakti Yoga
- Bhakti Yoga
- Complete works. Vol 5
- The East and the West
- Inspired Talks (1909)
- Narada Bhakti Sutras – translation
- Lectures from Colombo to Almora (1904)
- Para Bhakti or Supreme Devotion
- Practical Vedanta
- Jnana Yoga
- Raja Yoga (1920)
- Speeches and writings of Swami Vivekananda; a comprehensive collection
- Vivekavani (1986) – Telugu
- Yoga (1987) – Telugu
- A Bouquet of Swami Vivekananda's Writings (2013), handwritten works of Swami Vivekananda

== Books on Swami Vivekananda ==
=== A–R ===
Book	Author/Editor	Publisher	ISBN
An Analytical Study of the Social Philosophy of Swami Vivekananda: A Thesis Submitted for the Degree of Doctor of Philosophy in Religious Studies at the University of Otago, Dunedin, New Zealand	Stephen Abraham	University of Otago	
A Biography of Swami Vivekananda	Gautam Ghosh	Rupa & Co.	ISBN 978-81-291-0149-5
A comprehensive biography of Swami Vivekananda	Sailendra Nath Dhar	Vivekananda Prakashan Kendra	
A Short Life of Swami Vivekananda	Pavitrananda (Swami.)	Advaita Ashrama	
A study on Swami Vivekananda's doctrine of "Real Man" with special reference to the Christian view of man according to St. Thomas Aquinas	Mariadasan Chellamony	Pontificia Universitas Sanctae Crucis	
Biography of Swami Vivekananda	Dharam C. Vyas	Cyber Tech	ISBN 978-81-7884-693-4
Chronology of Swami Vivekananda in the West	Terrance D. Hohner, Carolyn B. Kenny	Prana Press	ISBN 978-0-9700868-0-8
Contemporary Indian idealism (with special reference to Swami Vivekananda, Sri Aurobindo, and Sarvepalli Radhakrishnan).	Ripusudan Prasad Srivastava	Motilal Banarsidass	
Cultural contact and fusion: Swami Vivekananda in the West, 1893–96	Satish K. Kapoor	ABS Publications	
Did Swami Vivekananda Give Up Hinduism?	G. C. Asnani	Sister Nivedita Academy	
Educational Philosophy of Swami Vivekananda	S.V. Bharathi	Discovery Publishing House	ISBN 978-81-8356-023-8
Educational philosophy of Swami Vivekananda	T. S. Avinashilingam	Sri Ramakrishna Mission Vidyalaya	
Educational philosophies of Swami Vivekananda and John Dewey	D. Vijaya Bharathy	ISBN 978-81-7648-202-8	
Ethical ideas in the world outlook of Swami Vivekananda, Lokamanya B.G. Tilak, and Aurobindo Ghose	Irina Pavlovna Chelysheva	Vostok	
Great Political Thinker: Swami Vivekananda	S.K. Chaudhary	Sonali Publications	ISBN 978-81-8411-140-8
Harmony of religions: the relevance of Swami Vivekananda	Kalarikkal Poulose Aleaz	Punthi-Pustak	ISBN 978-81-85094-59-5
Idealistic Philosophy of Swami Vivekananda	G. Ranjit Sharma	Atlantic Publishers & Distri	
Learn Rajayoga from Vivekananda: A Grand Exposition of India's Unique Philosophy and Practice of Yoga, which Swami Vivekananda Made for His American Disciples	Mahendra Kulasrestha	Lotus Press	ISBN 978-81-8382-009-7
Life and Philosophy of Swami Vivekananda	G. S Banhatti	Atlantic Publishers & Dist	ISBN 978-81-7156-291-6
Life of Swami Vivekananda	Vivekananda's Disciples	Vedanta Press	ISBN 978-0-87481-085-1
Life of Swami Vivekananda: (12 January 1863 to 4 July 1902); Drama in Engl. Staged on 31 March 1982 at Sri Thyagaraja Hall, Calcutta by Bala Vihar Children, Calcutta	Thevarkal Venketes Waraiyer Narayanaswamy	Central Chinmaya Mission Trust	
Make me a man, message of Swami Vivekananda	T. S. Avinashilingam	Sri Ramakrishna Mission Vidyalaya	
Man Without Frontiers: The Ultimate Concern of Swami Vivekananda	Maria Arokiam Kanaga	Salesian Pontifical University, Faculty of Philosophy	
Monastic disciples of Swami Vivekananda: inspiring life-stories of some principal disciples	Abjajānanda (Swami.)	Advaita Ashrama	ISBN 978-81-7505-246-8
Negotiating Worlds, Re-envisioning Modernity: Swami Vivekananda and Colonial Discourse	Kristen Anne Hardy	University of Manitoba (Canada)	ISBN 978-0-494-22501-1
Neo-Hinduism: an exposition of Swami Vivekananda's conception of Vedantism (Yoga philosophy)	D. V. Athalye	D.B. Taraporevala sons and co.	
Notes of some wanderings with the Swami Vivekananda	Sister Nivedita	Udbodhan, Calcutta	N.A.
Perspectives on Ramakrishna-Vivekananda Vedanta tradition	M. Sivaramakrishna, Sumita Roy	Sterling Publishers	
Photographs of Swami Vivekananda, 1886–1901	Vedanta Society of Northern California	Sri Ramakrishna Math	ISBN 978-81-7823-000-9
Political Concept of Swami Vivekananda	Sajal Basu	Sujan Publications	ISBN 978-81-85549-02-6
Political Philosophy of Swami Vivekananda	Kalpana Mohapatra	Northern Book Centre	ISBN 978-81-7211-079-6
Prophet disarmed: Vivekananda and Nivedita	Narasingha Prosad Sil	Monash Asia Institute, Centre of South Asian Studies, Monash University	ISBN 978-0-7326-1161-3
Quintessence of Yoga Philosophy: An Exploration of Swami Vivekananda's Conception of Practical Vedantism (Neo-Hinduism)	D. V. Athalye	Taraporevala	
Rediscovering Swami Vivekananda	Amiya Kumara Majumadara	BPR Publishers	ISBN 978-81-908841-9-8
Reflections on Swami Vivekananda: Hundred Years After Chicago	M. Sivaramkrishna	South Asia Books	ISBN 978-81-207-1603-2
Religious and moral philosophy of Swami Vivekananda	Shail Kumari Singh	Janaki Prakashan	
Religious Revivalism As Nationalist Discourse: Swami Vivekananda and New Hinduism in Nineteenth-Century Bengal	Shamita Basu	Oxford University Press	ISBN 978-0-19-565371-7
Reminiscences of Swami Vivekananda: by his Eastern and Western admirers	Eastern and Western admirers	Advaita Ashrama	
Revolutionary Ideas of Swami Vivekananda	Rabindra Kumar Das Gupta	Ramakrishna Mission Institute of Culture	

=== S ===
Book	Author/Editor	Publisher	ISBN
Saints of India: Swami Vivekananda	Shiri Ram Bakshi, Sangh Mittra	Criterion	
Short Life of Swami Vivekananda	Swami Tejasananda	Advaita Ashrama	ISBN 978-81-7505-030-3
Social Philosophy of Swami Vivekananda	A.R. Mohapatra	Readworthy Publications (P) Limited	ISBN 978-93-80009-01-8
Social Philosophy of Swami Vivekananda	Santwana Dasgupta	Ramakrishna Mission Institute of Culture	ISBN 978-81-87332-43-5
Sri Ramakrishna and Swami Vivekananda	Jawaharlal Nehru	Advaita Ashrama (Publication Department)	ISBN 978-81-7505-004-4
Swami Vivekanand	B. R. Kishore	Diamond Pocket Books (P) Ltd.	ISBN 978-81-7182-952-1
Swami Vivekanand : educational philosopher & his work	S.K. Shukla	Omega Publications	ISBN 978-81-8455-091-7
Swami Vivekananda	Amiya Sen	Oxford University Press	ISBN 978-0-19-564565-1
Swami Vivekananda	Bābūrāma Śarmā	Diamond Pocket Books	
Swami Vivekananda	Dr. M. H. Syed, R. K. Singh, P. K. Choudhry	Himalaya Books	
Swami Vivekananda	K. L. Miglani	Pinnacle Technology	ISBN 978-1-61820-127-0
Swami Vivekananda	M. S. Nateson	Vivekananda Publishing House	
Swami Vivekananda	N.L. Gupta	Anmol Publications Pvt. Ltd	ISBN 978-81-261-1538-9
Swami Vivekananda	Premacanda	Saraswathi Press	
Swami Vivekananda	S. Paul	Sterling Publishers Pvt., Limited	ISBN 978-81-7862-440-2
Swami Vivekananda	Sachi Sinhal	Prabhat Prakashan	ISBN 978-81-8430-018-5
Swami Vivekananda	Satyakam Vidyalankar	Hind Pocket Books	
Swami Vivekananda	Una Da Manavad	Raghbir Rachnac	
Swami Vivekananda	Verinder Grover	Deep & Deep Publications	ISBN 978-81-7100-570-3
Swami Vivekananda: a forgotten chapter of his life	Benishankar Sharma	Oxford Book & Stationary Co.	
Swami Vivekananda: A Historical Review	R. C. Majumdar	Advaita Ashrama	ISBN 978-81-7505-202-4
Swami Vivekananda: A Man with a Vision	Devika Rangachari	Penguin Books Limited	ISBN 978-81-8475-563-3
Swami Vivekananda: A Mental and Spiritual Biography	Rajagopal Chattopadhyaya	Vivekananda Math	
Swami Vivekananda: A Reassessment	Narasingha Prosad Sil	Susquehanna University Press	ISBN 978-0-945636-97-7
Swami Vivekananda: A Sixth Plane Being in San Francisco	Belinda Worthen		
Swami Vivekananda: a study	D. V. Athalye	Ashish	
Swami Vivekananda: A Study on Aesthetics	Mohit Chakrabarti	Atlantic Publishers & Distri	
Swami Vivekananda : An Iconoclastic Ascetic	Ajeet Jawed	Ane Books India	ISBN 978-81-8052-195-9
Swami Vivekananda & Success of Students	A. R. K. Sarma	Sri Sarada Book House	
Swami Vivekananda and His Times: A Series of Lectures	B. Bhattacharya	NCIC	
Swami Vivekananda and Indian Nationalism	Subodh Chandra Sen Gupta	Sahitya Samsad	
Swami Vivekananda and Japan	Medhasananda		ISBN 978-4-931148-43-7
Swami Vivekananda and Religious Pluralism	Chacko Puthenpurackal	Pontificia Universitas Gregoriana	
Swami Vivekananda and Sri Ramakrishna in Sri Aurobindo's Writings	Sri Aurobindo, K. C. Anand	Sri Aurobindo Society	ISBN 978-81-7060-208-8
Swami Vivekananda and the emergence of India through spiritual culture	Sarvasthananda (Swami.)	Sri Ramakrishna Ashrama	
Swami Vivekananda and the Future of India	Ranganathananda (Swami.)	Ramakrishna Mission, Institute of Culture	
Swami Vivekananda and the Indian quest for socialism	Arun Kumar Biswas	Firma KLM	
Swami Vivekananda and the Indian Renaissance	Telliyavaram Mahadevan Ponnambalam Mahadevan	Sri Ramakrishna Mission, Vidyalaya Teachers College	
Swami Vivekananda: and the Modern World	Pranab Bandyopadhyay	United Writers	ISBN 978-81-85328-12-6
Swami Vivekananda and the modernisation of Hinduism	William Radice	Oxford University Press	ISBN 978-0-19-565093-8
Swami Vivekananda and the World of Youth	Nabaniharan Mukhopadhyay	Akhil Bharat Vivekananda Yuva Mahamandal	
Swami Vivekananda: Awakener of Modern India	R. Ramakrishnan	Sri Ramakrishna Math	
Swami Vivekananda centenary memorial volume	Ramesh Chandra Majumdar	Swami Vivekananda Centenary	
Swami Vivekananda's Concept of Service	Swami Swahananda	Sri Ramakrishna Math	ISBN 978-81-7120-900-2
Swami Vivekananda: Education of Love	Mohit Chakrabarti	Kanishka Publishers	ISBN 978-81-7391-822-3
Swami Vivekananda: Epoch-maker Spiritual Leader	Swami Jitatmananda	Shri Ramakrishna Ashrama	
Swami Vivekananda: Excellence in Education	Mohit Chakrabarti	Gyan Publishing House	ISBN 978-81-7835-479-8
Swami Vivekananda: His Dynamic Vision	Harbans Lal Agnihotri	Aman Prakashan	ISBN 978-81-900402-2-8
Swami Vivekananda: his global vision	Santinath Chattopadhyay	Punthi Pustak	ISBN 978-81-86791-29-5
Swami Vivekananda, His Human Books	Jung Bahadur Goyal	Falcon Books	ISBN 978-81-900592-0-6
Swami Vivekananda: his life & message	Anil Chandra Ghosh	Presidency Library	
Swami Vivekananda, his life and mission	Ranganathananda (Swami.)	Ramakrishna Mission Institute of Culture	
Swami Vivekananda, His Reconstruction of Hinduism as a Universal Religion	P. M. Thomas	McMaster University	
Swami Vivekananda: His Sanyasa ...	M. S. Natesan	Vivekananda Publishing House	
Swami Vivekananda, his second visit to the West: new discoveries	Marie Louise Burke	Advaita Ashrama	
Swami Vivekananda in America	Nivedita Raghunath Bhide	Vivekananda Kendra	ISBN 978-81-89248-22-2
Swami Vivekananda in America: new findings	Asim Chaudhuri	Advaita Ashrama, Publication Dept.	ISBN 978-81-7505-297-0
Swami Vivekananda in contemporary Indian news (1893–1902): with Ramakrishna and the Mission	Bimalakumāra Ghosha, Lakshmi Kanta Boral	Ramakrishna Mission Institute of Culture	ISBN 978-81-85843-89-6
Swami Vivekananda in Chicago: new findings	Asim Chaudhuri	Advaita Ashrama	ISBN 978-81-7505-211-6
Swami Vivekananda in India: A Corrective Biography	Chattopadhyay Rajagopal	Motilal Banarsidass Publ.	ISBN 978-81-208-1586-5
Swami Vivekananda: India's Emissary to the West	Swami Ranganathananda	Vivekananda Kendra Prakashan Trust	
Swami Vivekananda: insan-i-kamal : revisioning	Som P. Ranchan	Indian Publishers Distributors	ISBN 978-81-7341-053-6
Swami Vivekananda in San Francisco	Ashokananda (Swami.)	Vedanta Society of Northern California	
Swami Vivekananda in the West	Rajagopal Chattopadhyaya	The Author	
Swami Vivekananda in the West: New Discoveries (six volumes)	Sister Gargi	Advaita Ashrama, Kolkata	
Swami Vivekananda: Messiah of Resurgent India	Pranaba Ranjan Bhuyan	Atlantic Publishers & Dist	ISBN 978-81-269-0234-7
Swami Vivekananda on Education	Śaṅkara Abhyaṅkara	Aditya Pratishthan	ISBN 978-81-86879-05-4
Swami Vivekananda on Himself	Swami Sambudhdhananda	Advaita Ashrama	ISBN 81-7505-280-5
Swami Vivekananda on India and Her Problems	Swami Nirvedananda	Advaita Ashrama	
Swami Vivekananda on Indian philosophy and literature	Rabindra Kumar Dasgupta	Ramakrishna Mission Institute of Culture	ISBN 978-81-85843-81-0
Swami Vivekananda, patriot-prophet: a study	Bhūpendranātha Datta	Nababharat Publishers	
Swami Vivekananda: Pioneer in Social Revolution	Vidyotma Singh	Vista International Publishing House	ISBN 978-81-89942-13-7
Swami Vivekananda: literary biography	Carebanu Cooper		
Swami Vivekananda, the educator	V. Sukumaran Nair	Facet Books International	ISBN 978-0-932377-10-4
Swami Vivekananda, the known philosopher, the unknown poet	Radhika Nagrath	Meteor Books	ISBN 978-81-88248-05-6
Swami Vivekananda: The Living Vedanta	Chaturvedi Badrinath	Penguin Books India	ISBN 978-0-14-306209-7
Swami Vivekananda: the man and his mission	Sanat Kumar Rai Chaudhuri	Scientific Book Agency	
Swami Vivekananda, the prophet of Vedantic socialism	Vijendra Kasturi Ranga Varadaraja Rao	Publications Division, Ministry of Information and Broadcasting, Govt. of India	
Swami Vivekananda: Vibrant Humanist	Mohit Chakrabarti	Kanishka Publishers	ISBN 978-81-7391-420-1
Swami Vivekananda Vijnanagita: The Wisdom Song of Vivekananda	Babaji Bob Kindler	Srv Assoc	ISBN 978-1-891893-09-4
Swami Vivekananda: Visionary of Truth	Mohit Chakraborty	Abhijeet Publications	ISBN 978-93-80031-45-3
Swâmi Vivekânanda's contribution to the present age	Satprakashananda (Swami.)	Vedanta Society of St. Louis	ISBN 978-0-916356-58-3
Swami Vivekananda's ideas on history: with special reference to Indian history and culture	Tangsal Narayana Vasudeva Rao, Indian Council of Historical Research	Ramakrishna Mission Vidyapith, Institute of Vivekananda Studies	
Swami Vivekananda's legacy of service: a study of the Ramakrishna Math and Mission	Gwilym Beckerlegge	Oxford University Press	ISBN 978-0-19-567388-3
Swami Vivekananda's neo-Vedānta	Rabindra Kumar Dasgupta	Asiatic Society	
Swami Vivekananda's Understanding of Religious Pluralism: A Theological Assessment from a Catholic View Represented by Joseph Neuner	Sebastian Panjikaran	Pontificia Universitas Gregoriana, Facultas Theologiae	
Swami Vivekananda's Winning Formulas to Become Successful Managers	A. R. K. Sarma	Sri Sarada Book House	

=== T–Z ===
Book	Author/Editor	Publisher	ISBN
Teaching of Swami Vivekananda	Edgar Wesley Thompson	M.E. Publishing House	
The cyclonic Swami: Vivekananda in the West	Sukalyan Sengupta, Makarand R. Paranjape	Samvad India Foundation, in association with Center for Indic Studies, University of Massachusetts at Dartmouth	ISBN 978-81-901318-2-7
The concept of man according to Swami Vivekananda	Thaddeus J. Kunnumpurath	Pontificia Studiorum Universitas a S. Thoma Aq. in Urbe	
The Hermeneutics of Religious Syncretism: Swami Vivekananda's Practical Vedanta	Thomas L. Bryson	University of Chicago, The Divinity School	
The Immortal Philosopher of India Swami Vivekananda	Bhawan Singh Rana and Mīnā Agravāla Meena Agrawal	Diamond Pocket Books (P) Ltd.	ISBN 978-81-288-1001-5
The life of Swami Vivekananda, by his eastern and western disciples	Gambhirananda (Swami.)	Advaita Ashrama	
The Master as I Saw Him	Sister Nivedita	Longmans, Green & Co.,	N.A.
The Message of Swami Vivekananda	Karan Singh (Sadr-i-Riyasat of Jammu and Kashmir)	Swami Vivekananda Centenary Celebration and Vivekananda Rock Memorial Committee, Publication Department	
The Message of Swami Vivekananda: To the Modern World	K. S. Ramaswami Sastri	Ramakrishna Math	
The Mind of Swami Vivekananda: An Anthology and a Study	Gautam Sen	Jaico Publishing House	ISBN 978-81-7224-212-1
The Monk As Man: The Unknown Life of Swami Vivekananda	1933– Samkara	Penguin Books India	ISBN 978-0-14-310119-2
The Nationalistic and Religious Lectures of Swami Vivekananda	Tapasyananda (Swami.)	Advaita Ashrama	
The Philosophy of Swami Vivekananda: Chicago Address Centenary Volume : Homage from Visva-Bharati	Pradip Kumar Sengupta	Progressive Publishers	
The political philosophy of Swami Vivekananda	A. V. Rathna Reddy	Sterling	
The Religious and Political Thought of Swami Vivekananda	Aron Harilela	University of Hull	
The social philosophy of Swami Vivekananda: its relevance to modern India	Abraham Stephen	Indian Society for Promoting Christian Knowledge	ISBN 978-81-7214-843-0
The Socio-Political Philosophy of Swami Vivekananda	Bhaiya Subhash Chandra Prasad	Universal-Publishers	ISBN 978-1-58112-075-2
The social and political ideas of Swami Vivekananda	S. S. Mital	Metropolitan	
The Swami Vivekananda: A Study	Mano Mohan Ganguly	Contemporary Publishers	
The universal symphony of Swami Vivekananda	Ranganathananda (Swami.)		
The Vedantic Synthesis of Swami Vivekananda	Andrew Avison Ross	University of Canterbury	
The Teachings of Swami Vivekananda	Avyaktananda (Swami.)	Vedanta Movement	
The Vedānta of Swami Vivekananda	B. Prasannakumary	Writers Workshop Publication	ISBN 978-81-7595-307-9
The Vedanta of Swami Vivekananda	Suhas Ranjan Ray	Sristi Prakashan	
Vivekananda	Gajanan Khergamker	Jaico Publishing House	ISBN 978-81-7992-171-5
Vivekananda: A Biography	Swami Nikhilananda		
Vivekenanda: a comprehensive study	Jyotir Maya Nanda (Swami)	Swami Jyotirmayananda	ISBN 978-81-85304-66-3
Vivekananda and Indian renaissance	B. K. Ahluwalia, Shashi Ahluwalia	Associated Pub. Co.	
Vivekananda: his gospel of man-making with a garland of tributes and a chronicle of his life and times, with pictures	Jyotir Maya Nanda (Swami)	Swami Jyotirmayananda	ISBN 978-81-85304-66-3
Vivekananda: World Teacher	Swami Adiswarananda		ISBN 978-1-59473-210-2
Vivekananda, the prophet of human emancipation: a study on the social philosophy of Swami Vivekananda	Santwana Dasgupta	Bijaya Dasgupta	
Vivekananda, the warrior saint: a biographical study	Haṃsrāja Rahabara	Farsight Publishers & Distributors	
Vivekananda: The Yogas and Other Works	Swami Hikhilananda	Ramakrishna Vivekanada Center	ISBN 978-0-911206-04-3
Vivekananda's approach to social work	Indira Patel	Sri Ramakrishna Math	
Vivekananda's influence on Subhas	Nanda Mookerjee	Jayasree Prakashan	
Vivekananda's message to the youth	Vijendra Kasturi Ranga Varadaraja Rao, T. S. Avinashilingam	Bharatiya Vidya Bhavan	
Vivekananda Reader	Swami Narasimhananda (edited)	Advaita Ashrama	ISBN 978-81-7505-364-9
Wandering Monk: Permanent Exhibition at Kanyakumari on Swami Vivekananda as a Parivrajaka	M. Lakshmi Kumari	Vivekananda Kendra	
Western women in the footsteps of Swami Vivekananda	Atmaprana (Pravrajika.)	Ramakrishna Sarada Mission	
Wisdom of Vivekanand	Sachin Sinhal	Prabhat Prakashan	ISBN 978-81-8430-062-8
What Religion Is in the Words of Swami Vivekananda	John Yale	Kessinger Publishing	ISBN 978-1-4254-8880-2

== See also ==
- Bibliography of Ramakrishna
- Teachings and philosophy of Swami Vivekananda
