= Raja Yoga (book) =

Book by Swami Vivekananda

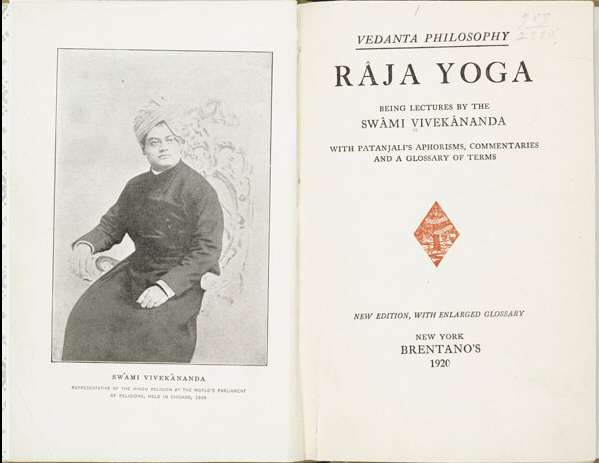
- Title page of 1920 edition
- Author: Swami Vivekananda
- Language: Hindi
- Subject: Philosophy
- Publication date: 1896
- Text: Raja Yoga at Wikisource

Raja Yoga is a book by Swami Vivekananda about "Raja Yoga", his interpretation of Patanjali's Yoga Sutras adapted for a Western audience. The book was published in July 1896. It became an instant success and was highly influential in the Western understanding of yoga.

== Contents and ideas ==
Raja Yoga contains transcripts of lectures by Vivekananda on "Raja Yoga", his interpretation of Patanjali's Yoga Sutras, and a "rather free translation" of Patanjali's Yoga Sutras plus Vivekananda's commentaries, which also was a series of talks. It presents Vivekananda's understanding and interpretation of Patanjali's Yoga Sutras, "and a selection of hathayoga teachings on the basis of the beliefs that he shared with his students." These included elements from traditional Hinduism, but also ideas from western science, Idealism, and "the Neo-Vedantic esotericism of the Brahmo Samaj and Western occultism," including mesmerism and "American Harmonial religion."

Vivekananda adapted traditional Hindu ideas and religiosity to suit the needs and understandings of Western audiences, who were especially attracted by and familiar with Western esoteric traditions and movements like transcendentalism and New Thought. An important element in his adaptation of Hindu religiosity was the introduction of his four yogas model, which includes Raja yoga, his interpretation of the Yoga Sutras. This offers a practical means to realize the divine force within, central to modern Western esotericism. The other three yogas are the classical Karma Yoga (Karma Yoga), Bhakti Yoga, and Jnana Yoga (Jnana Yoga).

Vivekananda's interpretation of Patanjali's Yoga Sutras is mostly based on the part on astanga yoga, the eight limbs of yoga described in the Sadhana Pada or practice part. According to De Michelis, Vivekananda's ideas on Raja Yoga mainly consists of two different models, with sometimes a third "mode of thought":

1. The Prana Model, which is mostly applied in the first part, is strongly influenced by the mesmeric beliefs which were popular at that time, (Note: Compare Sigmund Freud and his use of hypnosis as a therapeutic aid. Early on, similarities between yogic trance and hypnosis have been noted.) and also contains Hatha-yoga teachings. It gives a prominent place to prana as the central life force, which can be controlled by Raja Yoga. The accumulation of prana leads to liberation, and furthers "speed[s] up the adepts on their evolutionary path towards the ultimate goal."
2. The Samadhi Model, which focuses on the power of mind, is strongly influenced by transcendentalism, New Thought, and William James's functional psychology. Yoga is presented here as a journey of the mind back to its origins by means of meditative practice. According to Vivekananda, "each individual mind is part of the 'universal mind'" (Note: As phrased by De Michelis; not a quote from Vivekananda.) which can be rejoined by attaining samadhi.
3. A third mode of thought, called "Neo-Advaitic" by De Michelis, is otherworldly oriented. It insists on leaving behind "all powers and attainments" to reach an "altogether transcendent state." This state is reached in the last stage of samadhi, and is equal to the identification with the purusa, or "the One" or Emerson's Oversoul c.q. Absolute.

An appendix contains a translation of the Yoga Sutras of Patanjali.

== Reception and influence ==
Raja Yoga became an instant success and was highly influential in Western understanding of yoga; Elizabeth De Michelis has suggested it marks the start of modern yoga, though that later took very different forms. It presents exotic teachings to a cultic milieu that sought "ideologically familiar forms of practical spirituality."

== Sources ==
- Banhatti, G. S. (1995), Life and philosophy of Swami Vivekananda, New Delhi: Atlantic, p. 145, ISBN 8171562914
- De Michelis, Elizabeth (2004), A History of Modern Yoga, Continuum
- Singleton, Mark (2010), Yoga Body : the origins of modern posture practice, Oxford University Press, ISBN 978-0-19-539534-1, OCLC 318191988

== See also ==
- Teachings and philosophy of Swami Vivekananda
- Karma Yoga by Swami Vivekananda
- Jnana Yoga by Swami Vivekananda
- Neo-Vedanta
- Spirituality
- Nondualism
