= Teachings and philosophy of Swami Vivekananda =

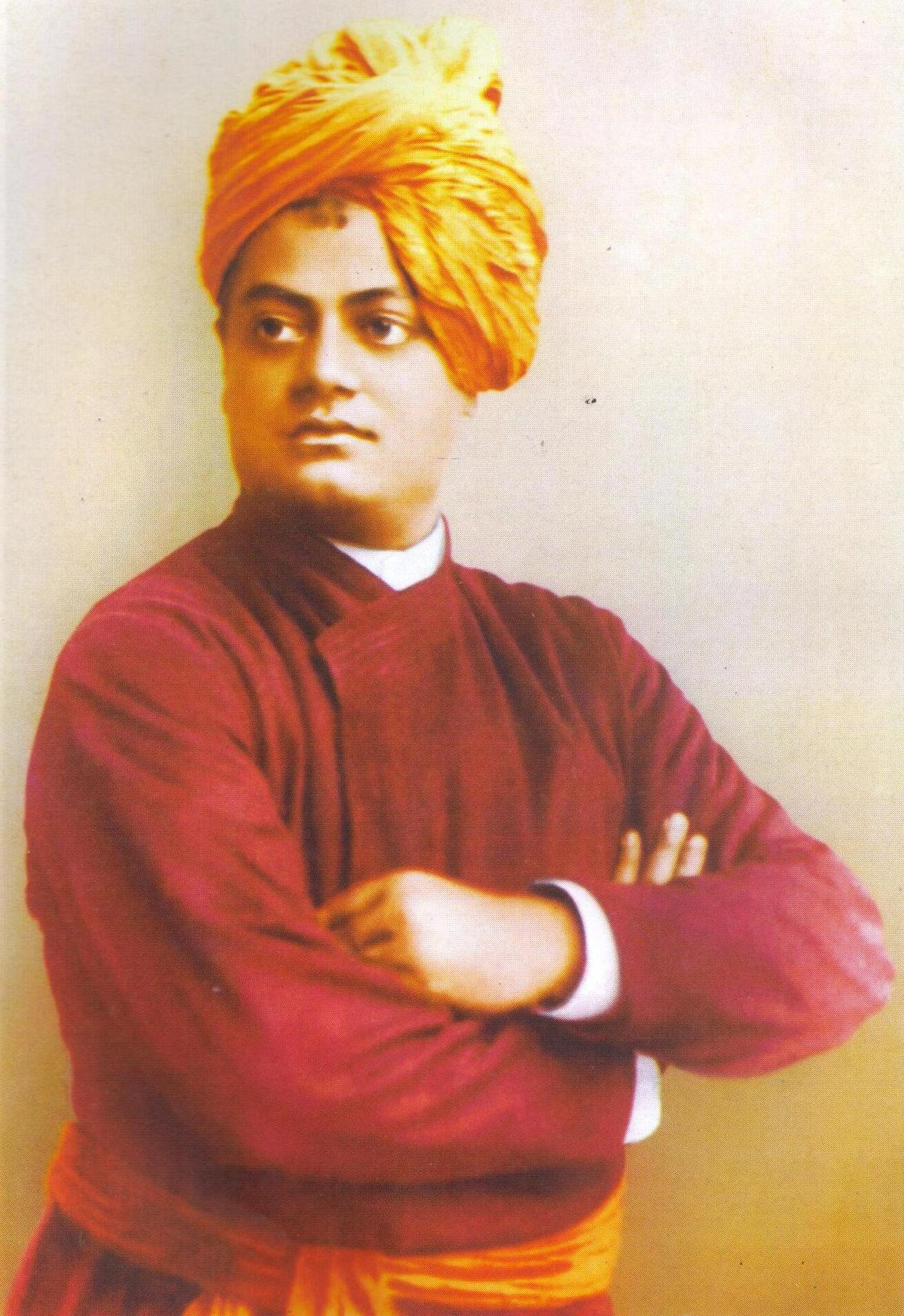
Swami Vivekananda's teachings and philosophy stressed on different aspects of religion, youth, education, faith, character building as well as social issues pertaining to India.

Swami Vivekananda was a Hindu monk from India. His teachings and philosophy are a reinterpretation and synthesis of various strands of Hindu thought, most notably classical yoga and Advaita Vedanta. He blended religion with nationalism, and applied this reinterpretation to various aspect's of education, faith, character building as well as social issues pertaining to India. His influence extended also to the west, and he was instrumental in introducing Yoga to the west.

== Advaita Vedanta ==
=== Western esoterism ===
While synthesizing and popularizing various strands of Hindu-thought, most notably classical yoga and (Advaita) Vedanta, Vivekananda was influenced by western ideas such as Universalism, via Unitarian missionaries who collaborated with the Brahmo Samaj. His initial beliefs were shaped by Brahmo concepts, which included belief in a formless God and the deprecation of idolatry, and a "streamlined, rationalized, monotheistic theology strongly coloured by a selective and modernistic reading of the Upanisads and of the Vedanta". He propagated the idea that "the divine, the absolute, exists within all human beings regardless of social status", and that "seeing the divine as the essence of others will promote love and social harmony". Via his affiliations with Keshub Chandra Sen's Nava Vidhan, the Freemasonry lodge, the Sadharan Brahmo Samaj, and Sen's Band of Hope, Vivekananda became acquainted with Western esotericism.

=== Ramakrishna ===
In 1881 Swami Vivekanand, then known by his pre-monastic name Narendra, first met Ramakrishna, who became his spiritual focus after his own father had died in 1884. According to Banhatti, it was Ramakrishna who really answered Narendra's question who had really seen God, by saying "Yes, I saw Him as I see you, only in an infinitely intenser sense." Ramakrishna gradually brought Narendra to a Vedanta-based worldview that "provides the ontological basis for 'śivajñāne jīver sevā', the spiritual practice of serving human beings as actual manifestations of God." According to Michael Taft, Ramakrishna reconciled the dualism of form and formless, regarding the Supreme Being to be both Personal and Impersonal, active and inactive. Ramakrishna stated that

The Personal and Impersonal are the same thing, like milk and its whiteness, the diamond and its lustre, the snake and its wriggling motion. It is impossible to conceive of the one without the other. The Divine Mother and Brahman are one.

Nevertheless, Vivekananda was more influenced by the Brahmo Samaj's and its new ideas, than by Ramakrishna.

=== Advaita Vedanta ===
Adhikārivāda in Hinduism, claimed special rights and privileges with regard to the right to universal knowledge of the Upanishads. Vivekananda rejected Adhikārivāda which, in his view, was the outcome of pure selfishness and ignored both the infinite possibilities of the human soul and the fact that all men are capable of receiving knowledge if it is imparted in their own respective languages. He claimed, there is no reason for access to the universal knowledge of the Upanishads to be restricted on the basis of caste or religion. It was his principal aim to translate the ideals of Vedanta into everyone's life.

Vivekananda propagated that the essence of Hinduism was best expressed in Adi Shankara's Advaita Vedanta philosophy. Nevertheless, following Ramakrishna, and in contrast to Advaita Vedanta, Vivekananda believed that the Absolute is both immanent and transcendent. (Note: According to Michael Taft, Ramakrishna reconciled the dualism of form and formless, regarding the Supreme Being to be both Personal and Impersonal, active and inactive. Ramakrishna: "When I think of the Supreme Being as inactive – neither creating nor preserving nor destroying – I call Him Brahman or Purusha, the Impersonal God. When I think of Him as active – creating, preserving and destroying – I call Him Sakti or Maya or Prakriti, the Personal God. But the distinction between them does not mean a difference. The Personal and Impersonal are the same thing, like milk and its whiteness, the diamond and its lustre, the snake and its wriggling motion. It is impossible to conceive of the one without the other. The Divine Mother and Brahman are one.") According to Anil Sooklal, Vivekananda's neo-Vedanta "reconciles Dvaita or dualism and Advaita or non-dualism," viewing Brahman as "one without a second," yet "both qualified, saguna, and qualityless, nirguna." (Note: Sooklalmquoytes Chatterjee: "Sankara's Vedanta is known as Advaita or non-dualism, pure and simple. Hence it is sometimes referred to as Kevala-Advaita or unqualified monism. It may also be called abstract monism in so far as Brahman, the Ultimate Reality, is, according to it, devoid of all qualities and distinctions, nirguna and nirvisesa [...] The Neo-Vedanta is also Advaitic inasmuch as it holds that Brahman, the Ultimate Reality, is one without a second, ekamevadvitiyam. But as distinguished from the traditional Advaita of Sankara, it is a synthetic Vedanta which reconciles Dvaita or dualism and Advaita or non-dualism and also other theories of reality. In this sense it may also be called concrete monism in so far as it holds that Brahman is both qualified, saguna, and qualityless, nirguna (Chatterjee, 1963 : 260).") Vivekananda summarised the Vedanta as follows, giving it a modern and Universalistic interpretation, showing the influence of classical yoga:

Each soul is potentially divine. The goal is to manifest this Divinity within by controlling nature, external and internal. Do this either by work, or worship, or mental discipline, or philosophy — by one, or more, or all of these — and be free. This is the whole of religion. Doctrines, or dogmas, or rituals, or books, or temples, or forms, are but secondary details.

=== Yoga and Samkhya ===
Vivekananda's emphasis on nirvikalpa samadhi was preceded by medieval yogic influences on Advaita Vedanta. In line with Advaita Vedanta texts like Dŗg-Dŗśya-Viveka (14th century) and Vedantasara (of Sadananda) (15th century), Vivekananda saw samadhi as a means to attain liberation. (Note: The Advaita Vedanta tradition in medieval times was influenced by, and incorporated elements from, the yogic tradition and texts like the Yoga Vasistha and the Bhagavata Purana. The Yoga Vasistha became an authoritative source text in the Advaita vedanta tradition in the 14th century, while Vidyāraņya's Jivanmuktiviveka (14th century) was influenced by the (Laghu-)Yoga-Vasistha, which in turn was influenced by Kashmir Shaivism.)

Vivekananda popularized the notion of involution, a term which Vivekananda probably took from western Theosophists, notably Helena Blavatsky, in addition to Darwin's notion of evolution, and possibly referring to the Samkhya term sātkarya. Theosophic ideas on involution has "much in common" with "theories of the descent of God in Gnosticism, Kabbalah, and other esoteric schools." According to Meera Nanda, "Vivekananda uses the word involution exactly how it appears in Theosophy: the descent, or the involvement, of divine consciousness into matter." With spirit, Vivekananda refers to prana or purusha, derived ("with some original twists") from Samkhya and classical yoga as presented by Patanjali in the Yoga Sutras.

Vivekananda linked morality with control of the mind, seeing truth, purity and unselfishness as traits which strengthened it. He advised his followers to be holy, unselfish and to have shraddhā (faith). Vivekananda supported brahmacharya, believing it the source of his physical and mental stamina and eloquence.

== Indian nationalism and personal development ==
Nationalism was a prominent theme in Vivekananda's thought. He believed that a country's future depends on its people, and his teachings focused on human development. He wanted "to set in motion a machinery which will bring noblest ideas to the doorstep of even the poorest and the meanest".

=== Nationalism ===
Vivekananda played a major role in the growing Indian nationalist sentiments in the late 19th and the 20th century, encouraging many Indians with his success and appeal in the West. His example helped to build pride in India's cultural and religious heritage, and supported the Indian independence movement. Vivekananda participated in several of these movements, calling for Indian independence from British rule. Swami Vivekananda believed that India is the blessed punyabhumi, the "land of virtue":

.. the land where humanity has attained its highest towards generosity, towards purity, towards calmness, above all, the land of introspection and of spirituality - it is India.

According to Vivekananda, a country's future depends on its people, stating that "man-making is my mission." Religion plays a central role in this man-making, stating "to preach unto mankind their divinity, and how to make it manifest in every movement of life." It is coordinated willpower that would lead to independence, even with forty millions Britons ruling three hundred million people in India. According to Vivekananda, those forty million Britons put their wills together and that resulted infinite power, and that was the reason of their success. Vivekananda prescribed, to make a great future India the whole serest will lie in organization, accumulation of power, co-ordination of wills.

=== Personal development and religion ===
In line with the influence of western ideas, Vivekananda stressed the importance of individual development. Swami Vivekananda realized three things are necessary to make every man great, every nation great, namely conviction of the powers of goodness; absence of jealousy and suspicion; and helping all who are trying to be and do good. Swami Vivekananda suggested trying to give up jealousy and conceit and learn to work unitedly for others. He told that purity, patience and perseverance overcome all obstacles. He suggested taking courage and work on. Patience and steady work, according to Swami Vivekananda, this is the only way to get success.

According to Swami Vivekananda, "faith in ourselves and faith in God- this is the secret of greatness". Swami Vivekananda observed the history of the world is the history of a few men who had faith in themselves, and it is faith which calls out divinity within. So he told, if people have faith in three hundred and thirty millions of Hindu mythological gods, and in all the gods which foreigners have now and still have no faith in themselves, there will be no salvation. To Vivekananda, religion was not mere theory, but an actual practice to be applied in life, raising the brute into man, and man into God, stating "it is being and becoming, not hearing or acknowledging; it is the whole soul becoming changed into what it believes." He hated the religious rituals that were in practice during that time. Vivekananda also noted that meditation in isolation won't suffice:

The tidal wave of Western Civilisation is now rushing over the length and breadth of the country. It won't do now simply to sit in meditation on mountain tops without realizing in the least its usefulness. Now is wanted intense Karmayoga, with unbounded courage and indomitable strength in the heart. Then only will the people of the country be roused.

== Social Services ==
=== Social service ===
Social service was an essential aspect of Vivekananda's ideas, and an innovation which deviated from both Advaita Vedanta and Ramakrishna. He nevertheless attributed these ideas to both, trying to reconcile them with his own ideas.

According to Vivekananda, an important teaching he received from Ramakrishna was that Jiva is Shiva (each individual is divinity itself). So he stressed on Shiva Jnane Jiva Seva, (to serve common people considering them as manifestation of God). According to Vivekananda, man is potentially Divine, so, service to man is indeed service to God.

=== Non-injury ===
Swami Vivekananda called Jain monks the first great ascetics. He praised their ancient knowledge of presence of low form of life in water:

A terrible thing, killing these low forms of life. So these monks, if they died of thirst, they would never kill these animals by drinking water. How all that we call ethics they simply bring out from that one great principle of non-injury and doing good.

=== Caste System ===
He emphasized that the caste system was not by birth as per ancient Hindu traditions. It is more about social structure i.e. by profession where a child born in a Kshatriya family can become Brahmin also. A striking contrast was noticed in the idea of Vivekananda regarding the caste system. Strangely enough, he supported the Varna system as described in the Vedas. Unfolding the advantages of the caste system, he told that division of labour is a great blessing of this system. It would lead to excellence in any profession.

This division, of course, will lead to a caste on the path of progress. However, he also exposed the evils of this system. Untouchability was its worst part. So, Vivekananda criticized this type of “Don’t touches”. He wanted to curb out this type of dogmatism from the society and urged for the creation of an egalitarian society.

=== Education ===
Vivekananda believed education is the manifestation of perfection already in men. He thought it is a pity that the existing system of education did not enable a person to stand on his own feet, nor did it teach him self-confidence and self-respect. To Vivekananda, education was not only collection of information, but something more meaningful; he felt education should be man-making, life giving and character-building. To him, education was an assimilation of noble ideas.

Education is not the amount of information that we put into your brain and runs riot there, undigested, all your life. We must have life building, man making, character making assimilation of ideas. If you have assimilated five ideas and made them your life and character, you have more education than any man who has got by heart a whole library...

Swami Vivekananda felt that the education that young boys and girls receive is very negative. He thinks they do not gain confidence or self-respect from this education, so according to Swami Vivekananda only positive education should be given to children. Swami Vivekananda told, if young boys and girls are encouraged and are not unnecessarily criticized all the time, they are bound to improve in time.
He also told the youth:

Set yourselves to the task of spreading education among the masses. Tell them and make them understand, "You are our brothers—a part and parcel of our bodies, and we love you and never hate you."

=== Womanhood ===
Swami Vivekananda warned it is completely unfair to discriminate between sexes, as there is no sex distinction in Ātman ('self', 'essence'), the soul has neither sex, nor caste nor imperfection. He suggested not to think that there are men and women, but only that there are human beings. Swami Vivekananda felt, The best thermometer to the progress of a nation is its treatment of its women and it is impossible to get back India's lost pride and honor unless they try to better the condition of women. Vivekananda considered men and women as two wings of a bird, and it is not possible for a bird to fly on only one wing. So, according to him, there is no chance for the welfare of the world unless the condition of woman is improved.

Therefore education for women was a major part of his education related schemes. He preached that rather than teaching girls to be dependent on others for their decisions, they should be educated so that they can solve their problems independently. He suggested to keep Dharma (faith) at the center of their education in addition to history and Puranas, home management, arts and craft, child development, culinary art etc.

Swami Vivekananda noticed almost everywhere women are treated as playthings. In modern countries like America, women have more independence, still, Vivekananda had noticed, men bow low, offer a woman a chair and in another breath they offer compliments like "Oh, how beautiful your eyes.." etc. Vivekananda felt, a man does not have any right to do this or venture so far, and any woman should not permit this as well. According to Swami Vivekananda, such things develop the less noble side of humanity. They do not tend to noble ideals.

According to Vivekananda, the ideal of womanhood in India is motherhood – that marvelous, unselfish, all-suffering, ever-forgiving mother. Vivekananda felt, in India, there are two great evils – trampling on the women, and grinding through the poor through caste restrictions.

According to Swami Vivekananda, Sita is typical of India – the idealized India. Swami Vivekananda assured if world literature of the past and world literature of the future are thoroughly exhausted, yet, it will not be possible to find another Sita, because Sita is unique, the character was depicted once for all. Swami Vivekananda felt there may have been several Ramas, perhaps, but never more than one Sita. Sita was a true Indian by nature, Vivekananda concluded, one who never returned an injury.

== Influence on western spirituality ==
Vivekananda's acquaintance with Western esotericism made him very successful in Western esoteric circles, beginning with his speech in 1893 at the Parliament of Religions. Vivekananda adapted traditional Hindu ideas and religiosity to suit the needs and understandings of his Western audiences, who were especially attracted by and familiar with Western esoteric traditions and movements like Transcendentalism and New Thought. An important element in his adaptation of Hindu religiosity was the introduction of his four yoga's model, which includes Raja yoga, his interpretation of the Yoga Sutras of Patanjali, which offered a practical means to realize the divine force within which is central to modern Western esotericism. In 1896 his book Raja Yoga was published, which became an instant success and was highly influential in the Western understanding of yoga.

== See also ==
- Bibliography of Swami Vivekananda
- Self-control
- Yoga
  - Ashtanga yoga
  - Bhakti yoga
  - Karma yoga
  - Jnana yoga

== Sources ==
- Badrinath, Chaturvedi (2006). Swami Vivekananda, the Living Vedanta. Penguin Books India. ISBN 978-0-14-306209-7.
- Banhatti, G.S. (1995), Life and Philosophy of Swami Vivekananda, Atlantic Publishers & Distributors, ISBN 978-81-7156-291-6
- Bhuyan, P. R. (2003), Swami Vivekananda: Messiah of Resurgent India, New Delhi: Atlantic Publishers & Distributors, ISBN 978-81-269-0234-7
- Chattopadhyaya, Rajagopal (1999), Swami Vivekananda in India: A Corrective Biography, Motilal Banarsidass, ISBN 978-81-208-1586-5
- Comans, Michael (1993), The Question of the Importance of Samadhi in Modern and Classical Advaita Vedanta. In: Philosophy East and West Vol. 43, No. 1 (January 1993), pp. 19-38.
- Flood, Gavin D. (1996), An Introduction to Hinduism, Cambridge University Press
- Halbfass, Wilhelm (1995), Philology and Confrontation: Paul Hacker on Traditional and Modern Vedānta, SUNY Press
- Heehs, Peter (2020), "Sri Aurobindo's Theory of Spiritual Evolution", in Mackenzie Brown, C. (ed.), Asian Religious Responses to Darwinism: Evolutionary Theories in Middle Eastern, South Asian, and East Asian Cultural Contexts, Springer Nature
- Jackson, Carl T (1994), "The Founders", Vedanta for the West: the Ramakrishna movement in the United States, Indianapolis, Indiana: Indiana University Press, ISBN 978-0-253-33098-7
- King, Richard (2002), Orientalism and Religion: Post-Colonial Theory, India and "The Mystic East", Routledge
- Kipf, David (1979), The Brahmo Samaj and the shaping of the modern Indian mind, Atlantic Publishers & Distri
- Madaio, James (2017), "Rethinking Neo-Vedānta: Swami Vivekananda and the Selective Historiography of Advaita Vedānta", Religions, 8 (6): 101, doi:10.3390/rel8060101
- Maharaj, Ayon (2020). "Śivajñāne jīver sevā: Reexamining Swami Vivekananda's Practical Vedānta in the Light of Sri Ramakrishna". Journal of Dharma Studies. 2 (2): 175–187. doi:10.1007/s42240-019-00046-x. S2CID 202387300.
- Michelis, Elizabeth De (2004), A History of Modern Yoga: Patanjali and Western Esotericism, Continuum, ISBN 978-0-8264-8772-8
- Nanda, Meera (2010), "Madame Blavatsky's Children: Modern Hindu Encounters with Darwinism", in Lewis, James R.; Hammer, Olav (eds.), Handbook of Religion and the Authority of Science, BRILL
- Rambachan, Anantanand (1994), The limits of scripture: Vivekananda's reinterpretation of the Vedas, Honolulu, Hawaii: University of Hawaii Press, ISBN 978-0-8248-1542-4
- Rinehart, Robin (1 January 2004). Contemporary Hinduism: Ritual, Culture, and Practice. ABC-CLIO. ISBN 978-1-57607-905-8.
- Seifer, Marc (2001), Wizard: The Life and Times of Nikola Tesla : Biography of a Genius, Citadel, ISBN 978-0-8065-1960-9
- Sen, Amiya (2006), Indispensable Vivekananda: anthology for our times, Orient Blackswan, ISBN 978-81-7824-130-2
- Sooklal, Anil (1993), "The Neo-Vedanta Philosophy of Swami Vivekananda" (PDF), Nidan, 5
- Taft, Michael (2014), Nondualism: A Brief History of a Timeless Concept, Cephalopod Rex
- Vivekananda, Swami (1996), Swami Lokeswarananda (ed.), My India : the India eternal (1st ed.), Calcutta: Ramakrishna Mission Institute of Culture, pp. 1–2, ISBN 81-85843-51-1
