= Four Yogas =

The Four Yogas may be:

- the Four Yugas in Hindu chronology
- the Four Yogas (Buddhism) or four kinds of attachment, viz. lust, desire for a future life, wrong views and ignorance
- the Four Yogas (Hinduism), or four paths to religion, viz. actions, religious devotion, meditation and knowledge
