= Ramakrishna Mission Vivekananda Educational and Research Institute =

Indian education institute

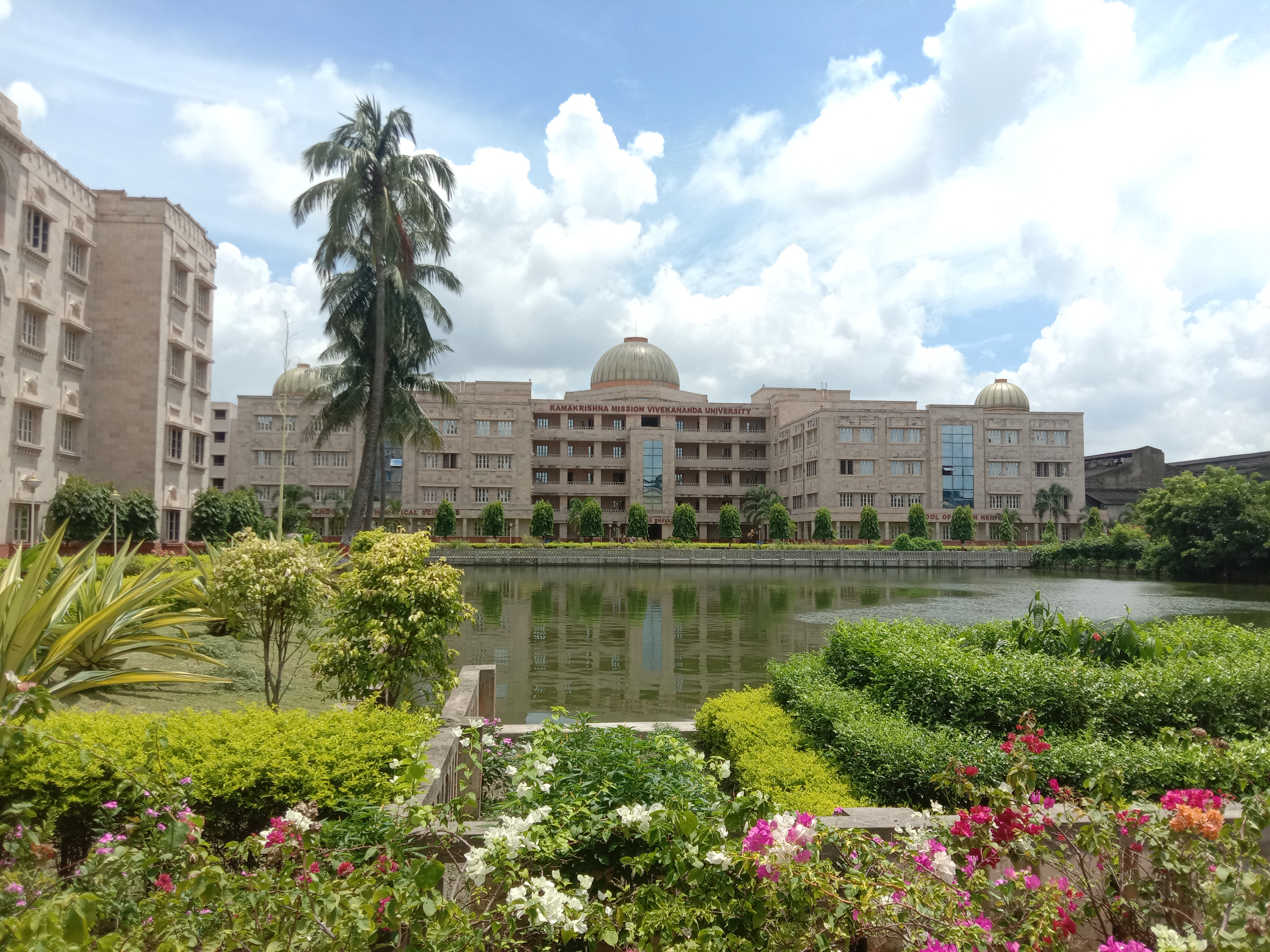
- Ramakrishna Mission Vivekananda Educational and Research Institute in Belur Math, 2022
- Former name: Ramakrishna Mission Vivekananda University
- Motto: Atmano mokshartham jagat hitaya cha
- Motto in English: For one's own salvation and for the welfare of the world
- Type: Deemed research university
- Established: 2005; 21 years ago
- Accreditation: NAAC
- Academic affiliations: UGC; AIU
- Chancellor: Swami Suvirananda
- Vice-Chancellor: Swami Sarvottamananda
- Location: Belur, West Bengal, India; 22°37′48″N 88°21′13″E
- Campus: Urban
- Website: www.rkmvu.ac.in

Ramakrishna Mission Vivekananda Educational and Research Institute, formerly Ramakrishna Mission Vivekananda University or simply Vivekananda University, is an education institute deemed-to-be-university headquartered at Belur, West Bengal, with campuses spanning multiple states in India. Established with the idea of actualizing Swami Vivekananda's vision of education, the institute is administered by the Ramakrishna Mission. The university provides courses on subjects as varied as rural and tribal development, disability management and special education, fundamental science education and Indian cultural and spiritual heritage.

== History ==
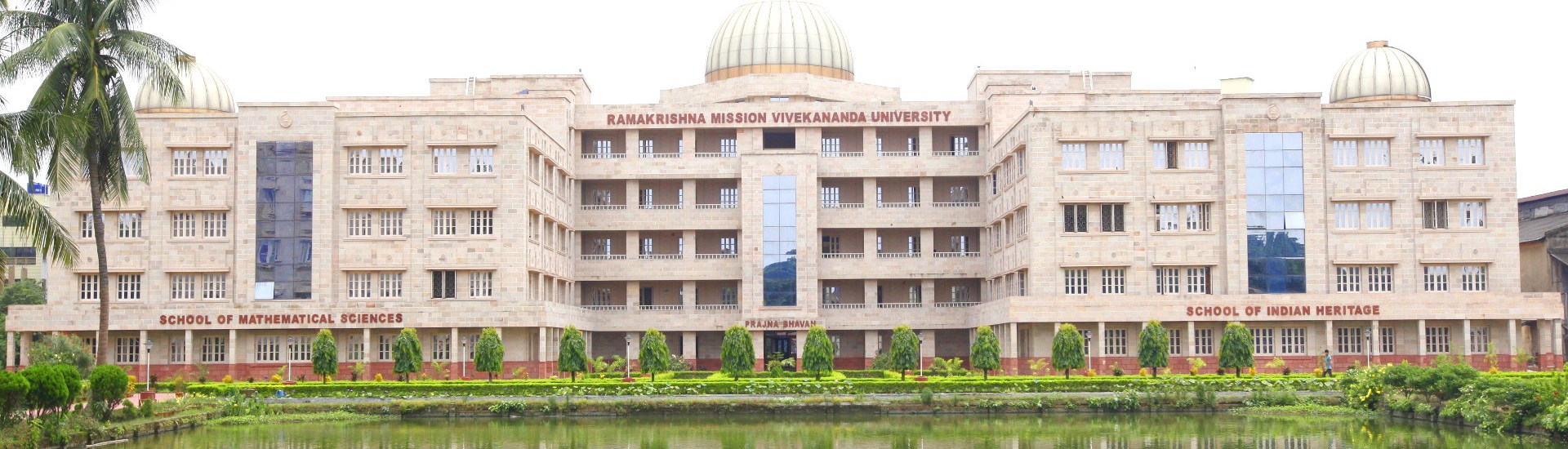
Prajna Bhavan, housing the School of Mathematical Sciences and School of Indian Heritage in the main campus

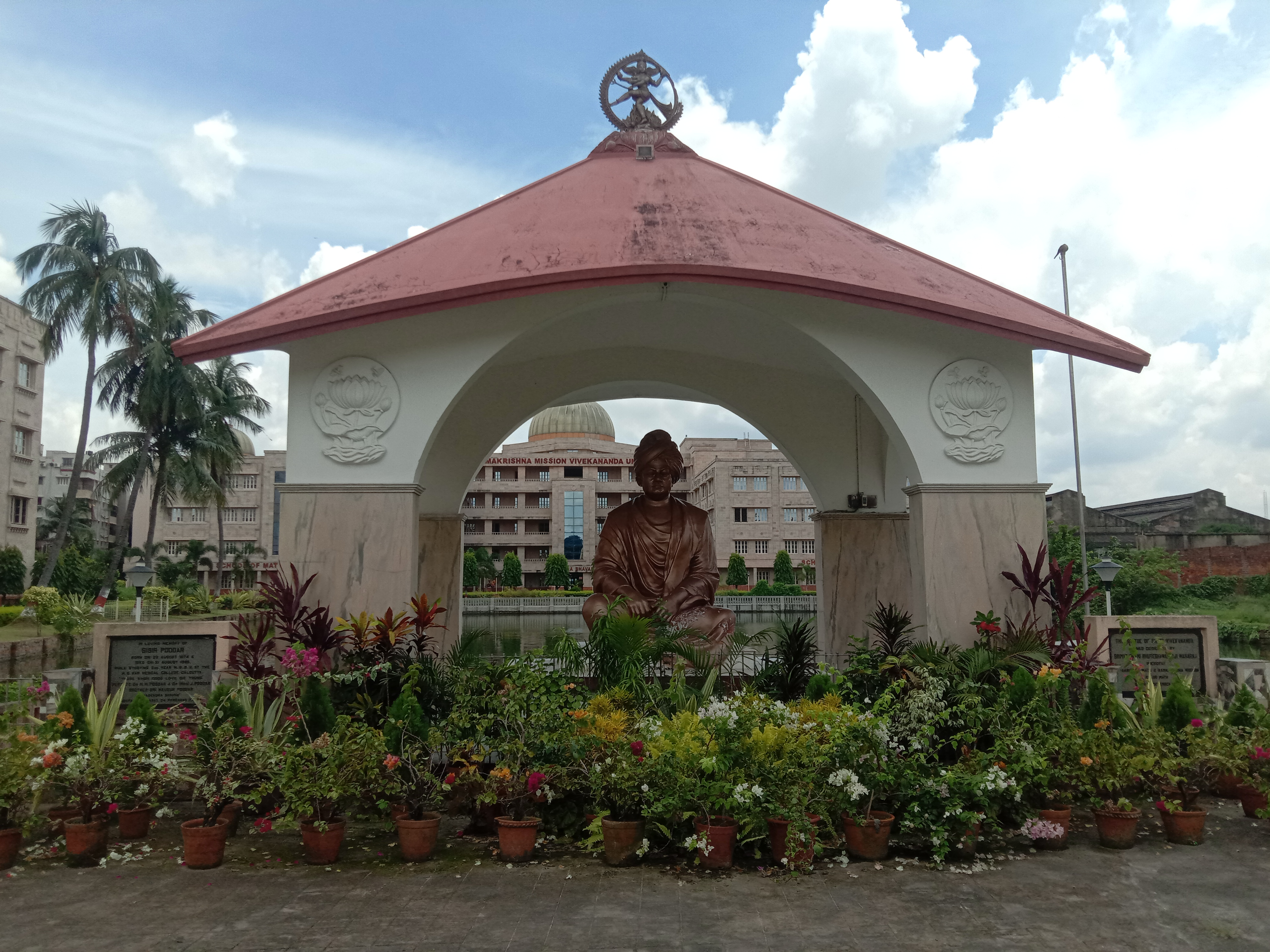
Statue of Swami Vivekananda in front of Ramakrishna Mission Vivekananda Educational and Research Institute.

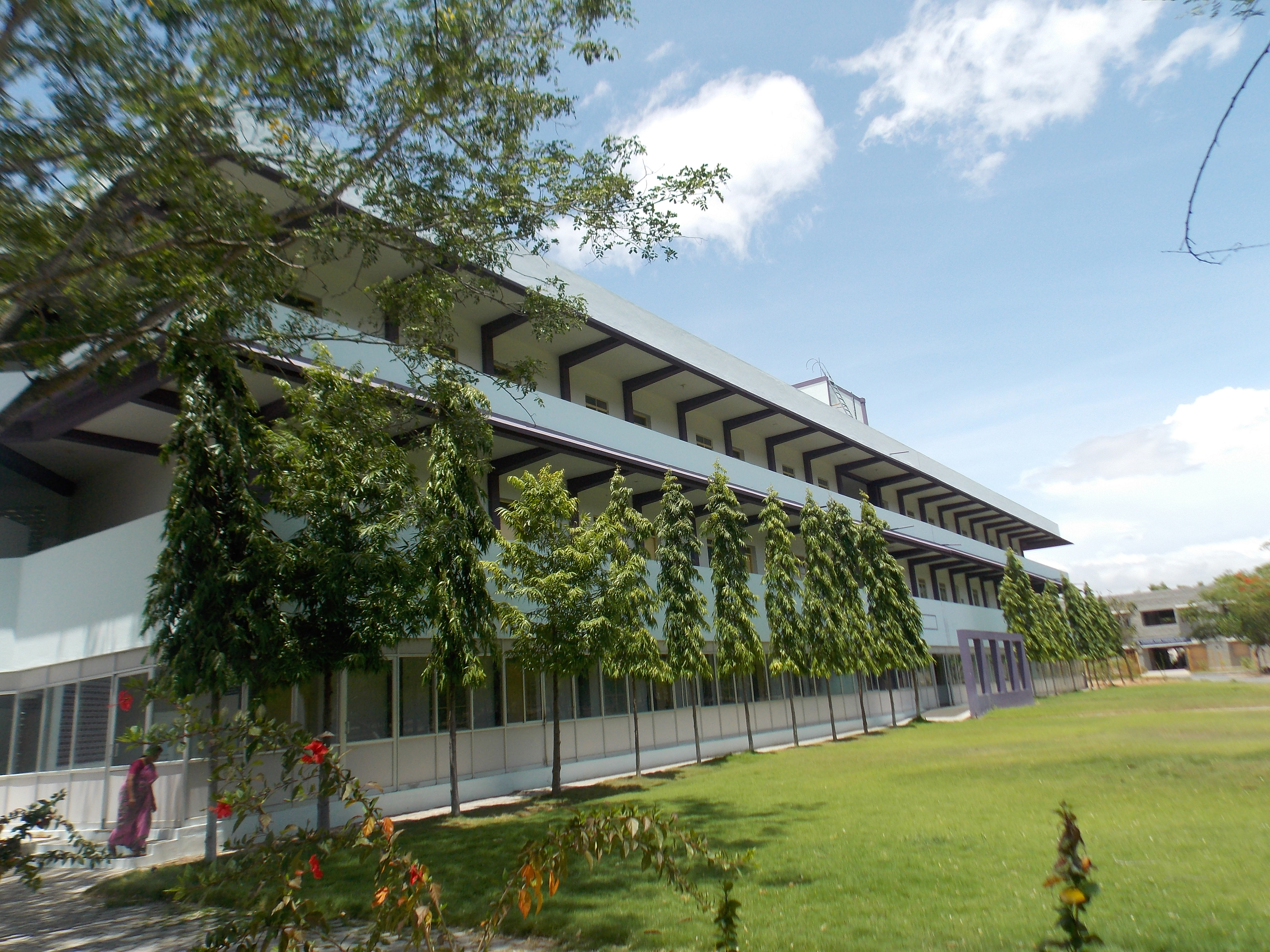
Administrative building of RKMVERI Coimbatore Campus

Ramakrishna Mission Vivekananda Educational and Research Institute was established with the idea of actualizing Swami Vivekananda's vision of education. It was declared as a de novo Deemed University by the Ministry of Human Resource Development, Government of India in 2005. With its headquarters at Belur, RKMVERI began functioning in July 2005 with one branch in the Specialized Faculty Centre at Coimbatore in the field of ‘Disability Management and Special Education’. In the following year, three new branches were added at Narendrapur, Ranchi and Kolkata (at Simla – the ancestral residence of Swami Vivekananda, currently operating under the Belur main campus). Swami Atmapriyananda was first Vice-Chancellor of the university and held the position from 2005 to 2020, thereafter he became the Pro-chancellor at the university.

Since then, two new schools have been established in the main campus, namely the School of Mathematical Sciences (focusing on mathematics, theoretical physics and theoretical computer science), and the School of Indian Heritage (including Sanskrit studies, ancient Indian heritage and Vedanta, especially the Upanishads and the Bhagavad Gita).

== Accreditation ==
In 2019, the institute was accredited by the National Assessment and Accreditation Council with a grade of A++.

== Notable faculty ==
- Mahan Maharaj (ex-faculty), awarded the 2011 Shanti Swarup Bhatnagar Prize for Science and Technology
- Narasimhaiengar Mukunda (Distinguished Associate), Indian physicist, Shanti Swarup Bhatnagar awardee
