= Swami Atmapriyananda =

Indian university administrator

- Swami Atmapriyananda (Ramakrishna Mission Vivekananda University, 2014)
- Born: J. Prabhakaran
- Education: Ph.D. in theoretical physics, University of Madras
- Occupations: Hindu monk, physicist, academic administrator
- Organization(s): Ramakrishna Order, Ramakrishna Math and Ramakrishna Mission
- Known for: First Vice-Chancellor of Ramakrishna Mission Vivekananda Educational and Research Institute
- Title: Pro-Chancellor, Ramakrishna Mission Vivekananda Educational and Research Institute; Co-President, Religions for Peace

Swami Atmapriyananda is an Indian university administrator, academic, public speaker and a monk (Sannyasin) of the Ramakrishna Order. He was the first Vice-Chancellor of Ramakrishna Mission Vivekananda Educational and Research Institute at Belur, West Bengal, and served the position from 2005 to 2020, thereafter he became the Pro-chancellor at the university.

== Biography ==
Born J Prabhakaran, he studied physics at Vivekananda College, Chennai (then Madras), graduating from the University of Madras in 1968. Next, he did M.Sc. in physics, specialising in theoretical nuclear physics, at Presidency College in 1971, postgraduate diploma in theoretical physics in 1972. He subsequently undertook doctoral research in the Department of Theoretical Physics at the University of Madras, completing his Ph.D. in 1975. He also taught physics at Loyola College, Chennai for three years.

During the period, through his association with Ramakrishna Math, Chennai, his interest in spiritual life deepened through meditation and service. Eventually he joined Ramakrishna Mission Saradapitha at Belur Math as a brahmacharin in 1978. After he joined the Ramakrishna Math and Ramakrishna Mission as a monk, he was posted to Ramakrishna Mission Vidyamandira, where he taught physics for nearly 25 years and later serving as Vice-Principal and Principal for alltogether 19 years. This was followed by his appointment as Vice-Chancellor of Ramakrishna Mission Vivekananda University in July 2005, a post he held till 2020, thereafter he became the Pro-chancellor at the university; he is also Co-President of New York-based international interfaith initiatives Religions for Peace.

In August 2026, Atmapriyananda was appointed a member of the West Bengal School Service Commission as part of a reconstituted panel intended to improve transparency and public confidence in SSC teacher recruitment in the state of West Bengal, marred by the 2022 scam.

== Honours ==
He received an honorary Doctor of Science (D.Sc.) from IIT Kharagpur in 2021 and an honorary Doctor of Letters (D.Litt.) from Assam University in 2022.

== See also ==
- Sannyasa Upanishads

== Books ==
- Atmapriyananda, Swami (2013). Advaita Vedanta (PDF). Occasional Publication. Vol. 55. New Delhi: India International Centre.
- Sannyasa Upanishads. Translated by Swami Atmapriyananda. Kolkata: Advaita Ashrama. 2013. ISBN 9788175054103.
- Hitananda, Swami (2000). Worship of Sri Ramakrishna. Translated by Swami Atmapriyananda. Chennai: Ramakrishna Math. ISBN 9788171204830.
- Bhar, Gopal Chandra; Atmapriyananda, Swami, eds. (2019). Science-Philosophy-Spirituality Interface: Handbook and Reference Manual. Belur Math: Ramakrishna Mission Vivekananda Educational and Research Institute.
- Shankaracharya (2025). Atma Anatma Viveka. Translated by Swami Atmapriyananda. Chennai: Ramakrishna Math. ISBN 9788198127846.
- Sannyasa Upanisads. Vol. 1. Translated by Swami Atmapriyananda. Belur Math: Ramakrishna Mission Vivekananda Educational and Research Institute. 2026. ISBN 9788199221024.
