= Swami Vivekananda in the West: New Discoveries =

1957 book by Sister Gargi

- Author: Sister Gargi
- Language: English
- Series: Swami Vivekananda in the West: New Discoveries
- Subject: Biography
- Publisher: Advaita Ashrama, Kolkata
- Publication date: 1957
- Publication place: India

Swami Vivekananda in the West: New Discoveries is a series of biographical books on Swami Vivekananda written by Marie Louise Burke, who is popularly known as Sister Gargi. There are six volumes in the series. This series of books was first published in two volumes in 1957. In 1983–87, these series was republished in six volumes. The book is high acclaimed not just in India, but also in the Vedanta circles around the world.

Swami Vivekananda spent a number of years (from 1893) teaching and lecturing in the West (specially in America and England). Sister Gargi researched for many years and then published her findings in these works. These books present previously unknown facts regarding Swami Vivekananda's life and works in America from 1893 to 1896 and, during his second visit, from 1899 to 1900.

== Volumes ==
The six volumes provide an exhaustive account of the time Swami Vivekananda spent in the west, especially in America and Europe.

Volume	Period
Volume I	Summer 1893 – Spring 1894
Volume II	Spring 1894 – Spring 1895
Volume III	Spring 1895 – February 1896
Volume IV	March 1896 – Fall, 1896
Volume V	June 1899 – April 1900
Volume VI	Spring 1900 – December 1900

== See also ==
- Bibliography of Swami Vivekananda
