= Jnana Yoga (book) =

Book by Swami Vivekananda

- Jnana Yoga of Swami Vivekananda front cover
- Author: Swami Vivekananda
- Language: English
- Subject: Indian philosophy
- Publication date: 1899
- Publication place: India

Jnana Yoga (lit. 'The Yoga of Knowledge') is a book of lectures by Swami Vivekananda as transcribed by Joseph Josiah Goodwin. The lectures were delivered mainly in New York and London. These lectures were recorded by Goodwin, a professional stenographer, who later became a disciple of Swami Vivekananda.

== Theme ==
Jnana yoga is one of the types of yoga mentioned in Hindu philosophies. Jñāna in Sanskrit means "knowledge"; the word is derived from Sanskrit jna – to know. In the book, Swami Vivekananda describes "knowledge" as the ultimate goal. According to Swami Vivekananda, freedom is the object of Jnana Yoga.

== Chapters ==
- The Necessity of Religion
- The Real Nature of Man
- Maya and Illusion
- Maya and the Evolution of the Conception of God
- Maya and Freedom
- The Absolute and Manifestation
- God in Everything
- Realisation
- Unity in Diversity
- The Freedom of the Soul
- The Cosmos: The Macrocosm
- The Cosmos: The Microcosm
- Immortality
- The Atman
- The Atman: Its Bondage and Freedom
- The Real and the Apparent Man
- The soul of everyone

== See also ==
- Karma Yoga
