= Swami Ashokananda =

Indian monk

Ashokananda
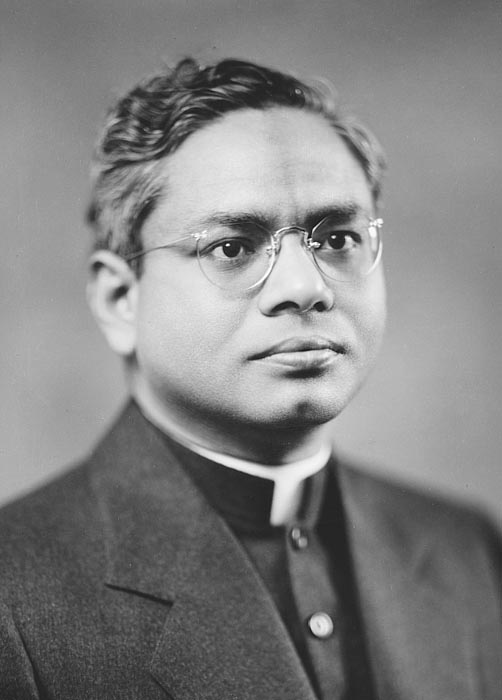
- "A brilliant and accomplished spiritual teacher in the west" – Huston Smith

Personal life
- Born: Yogeshchandra Dutta [Non-monastic name, till 1923] 23 September 1893 Bekiteka, Habiganj, North-East Frontier
- Died: 13 December 1969 (aged 76) Vedanta Society of Northern California
- Notable work(s): A Heart Poured Out, Shafts of Light, A Disciple's Journal, Ascent to Spiritual Illumination, Meditation Ecstasy and Illumination, A Soul's Journey to its Destiny, A Call to the Eternal, Spiritual Practice, The Influence of the East on the West, Spiritualizing Everyday Life, When the Many become One, Swami Vivekananda in San Francisco, edited Prabuddha Bharata for 5 years, ran The Voice of India magazine in America in 1945–1946, The Economic Views of Swami Vivekananda
- Known for: Spiritual Ministry in America [1932 – 1969], the editor of the Prabuddha Bharata, English monthly journal of the Ramakrishna Order, from 1926 to 1930

Religious life
- Religion: Hinduism
- Order: Ramakrishna Order of monks
- Philosophy: Advaita Vedanta
- Sect: Non-sectarian. Believes in the truth of all genuine religions.

Religious career
- Teacher: Vivekananda [Initiated Ashokananda in a vivid mystical vision, confirmed by four other direct monastic disciples of Ramakrishna--Brahmananda, Baburam Maharaj (Swami Premananda), Shivananda and Turiyananda.
- Disciples: Sister Gargi
- Influenced: Sarvepalli Radhakrishnan, Romain Rolland

Quotation

Meditation is not simply thinking of God. It is an actual perception of God. It is not imagination; it is the anticipation of the Real.

Swami Ashokananda (23 September 1893 – 13 December 1969), born as Yogeshchandra Dutta, was a disciple of Swami Vivekananda of India and a monk of the Ramakrishna Math. From 1932 until his death in December 1969 at the age of 76 he was in charge of the Vedanta Society of Northern California, San Francisco (founded by Vivekananda in 1900).

== Life ==
Yogesh Dutta was born in the village of Bekiteka. He spent his childhood days in Durgapur, a village seven or eight miles west of the town of Habibganj in the Sylhet district of Assam (now part of Bangladesh). After attending his uncle's elementary school, which covered the first five grades, he entered junior high school at Shayestaganj, two or three miles from Durgapur. He attended Murari Chand College in Sylhet, for two years, followed by two years at City College of the University of Calcutta where he won a gold medal for English literature. After graduating, he joined the Beanibazar High School in the town of Panchakhanda in the district of Sylhet, as an assistant headmaster. After working here for a year, he joined the Shayestaganj junior high school. During this time, he also worked with a village in Habiganj, providing education for the children, as well as basic medical care.

He joined the Ramakrishna Order in 1920, at the Madras center. In February 1923, on the birthday of Sri Ramakrishna, he was ordained into Sannyasa by Swami Shivananda, second President of the Order. After serving in the Ramakrishna Math, Madras till May 1925, Swami Ashokananda returned to Belur Math. In October 1925, he was assigned to the Advaita Ashrama at Mayavati, which was established by Swami Vivekananda. He served as an editor of the Prabuddha Bharata, English monthly journal of the Ramakrishna Order, from 1926 to December 1930, during which time he refuted some of Mahatma Gandhi's political and economic views. Opposing the views of Mahatma Gandhi, Swami Ashokananda believed that both spirituality and industrialization were possible.

In the February 1926 issue of the Prabuddha Bharata, Swami Ashokananda wrote: "Lower interests fulfill themselves by serving the higher ones; the latter in their turn attain fruition by declining to be exploited for lower profits....No nation can with impunity exploit its higher powers for lesser gains. To do so is to commit a Himalayan blunder. We are afraid the Indian National Congress has been guilty of the identical error in its policy and activities during the past few years. It sought to exploit religion for political ends."

According to Sankari Prasad Basu, "Going through all the articles of Ashokananda and replies of Gandhiji, we [have] to admit that the latter's expositions were no match for Ashokananda's sturdy and comprehensive intellect. Gandhiji simply reiterated his faith with great sincerity, and that is all. Ashokananda in his turn was also an idealist, a man of religion, but spirituality did not obstruct him to see and understand the material needs of the millions."

Swami Ashokananda took over as the editor of the Prabuddha Bharata in June 1926. From 1926 though 1930, he was in correspondence with Romain Rolland, the French historian, novelist and mystic who was writing the biographies of Sri Ramakrishna and Swami Vivekananda. Rolland's view was that the spread of Vedantic ideas in the Western world was due not to the modern-day diffusion of Vedantic thought but, rather, to "the unity of thought and laws that govern the [human] spirit." In reply, Swami Ashokananda wrote The Influence of Indian Thought on the Thought of the West.

In 1931, Swami Ashokananda left India for serving in the Vedanta Society of Northern California. He reached San Francisco on the 4th of July 1931 and would spend the rest of his life there.

In the early 1930s, when he arrived, Eastern Religions were still looked upon with suspicion in the Western world. Under his leadership the Vedanta Society of Northern California built three temples (in San Francisco, Berkeley and Sacramento) and bought two thousand acres of land in Olema that became the largest Vedanta Retreat in America.

== Works ==
Ashokananda rendered great service to the cause of the Vedanta movement in the West by his clear and thorough expositions of Vedantic teachings through lectures and classes for nearly four decades. A pioneer on the Vedanta frontier, he established new Vedanta Centres in Berkeley and Sacramento, developed the 2000-acre Vedanta Retreat at Olema (still the largest in the western hemisphere), and built the large New Temple in San Francisco to accommodate the Society's growing membership and activities. His contributions to the Vedanta Movement in America are well known, as are his lectures in print, which have become a popular source of inspiration since the first collection was published in 1970.

As her spiritual teacher, Gargi saw Ashokananda as a compassionate guide. An adherent of Advaita (non-dual) Vedanta, he was aware of the divinity of all life, and he saw in his disciples their potential perfection. Beyond their human quirks and ego-bound foibles, she says, he beheld the pure Spirit, and his role as a teacher was to polish the mirror of each disciple's perception to reflect this inner light.

From 1953 onward, his lectures were recorded on tape. Some of them have been transcribed and published.

- Meditate while you work – a new path for a new age
- When the many become One
- Spiritualising everyday life
- Swami Vivekananda in San Francisco
- Swami Brahmananda
- Swami Premananda
- Memoirs of Swami Shivananda
- The Teacher-Prophets of Vedanta
- The Theory and Practice of Monism
- The Razor's Edge
- Ritualism : Its place in Spiritual Life
- When the heart cries for God
- God and God-men in Vedanta
- Meditation, Ecstasy and Illumination
- Avadhuta Gita is his translation of that ancient treatise on Advaita philosophy by Dattatreya avadhuta.
- Shafts of Light is a compilation of over 800 of his directives to his disciples.
- His disciple Sister Gargi has written his biography – A Heart Poured Out

== Quotes about Ashokananda ==
"Swami Ashokananda's words emanated from the depths of his direct, illumined perception of the highest truths of Vedanta, and ignited in his listeners the longing for realization on their own." – American Vedantist

"Who was this man that one word of his could bore its way to the very heart of my being and resound there for years like a rousing gong?" – Sister Gargi

"In India there are just two or three original thinkers—just two or three, and Swami Ashokananda is one of them." - Sarvepalli Radhakrishnan

"Swami Ashokananda saw in his students their potential perfection. he brought courage and strength to hundreds of lives." – The Beacon

"Swami Ashokananda was a brilliant and accomplished spiritual teacher in the West." – Huston Smith, author of The World's Religions and Why Religion Matters.

"His personality was like a flame that could change the darkest chasms of one's mind into fields of light." – Sister Gargi

"Swami Ashokananda was a dynamic speaker, one of the best, and he attracted a steady stream of congregants to the Vedanta Society of Northern California." – Dr. Shelly Brown

"Swamiji (Swami Vivekananda) liked Swami Sadananda so much because he could write a little. He thought highly of him. But if he had known Ashokananda he would have always kept him close in his heart." – Swami Shivananda

"For almost twenty years I sat at the feet of Swami Ashokananda. I learned from him, was amazed by him, enchanted by him—and often left in profound awe." – Sister Gargi

"We are all thrashing about in a dark and hurtful world, and all the while we can light our own indistinguishable lamp of strength and wisdom by which we can see our way. This was Swami Ashokananda's faith, indeed, his knowledge, and so sure was that knowledge that he gave his life to showing us how to light our own lamps." – Sister Gargi

== Bibliography ==
- Sister Gargi (2003). A Disciple's Journal: In the Company of Swami Ashokananda. Kalpa Tree Press. ISBN 978-0-9706368-2-9.
