= The Monk as Man =

- First English edition
- Author: Shankar
- Original title: অচেনা অজানা বিবেকানন্দ
- Language: Bengali; English
- Genre: Biography
- Published: 2003
- Publication place: India
- English publication date: 2011
- Media type: Print

The Monk as Man: The Unknown Life of Swami Vivekananda or Achena Ajana Vivekananda is a book about Swami Vivekananda written by Shankar. In this book, Shankar discussed many unknown events of Vivekananda's life.

== Synopsis ==
Swami Vivekananda's personal life's troubles, anxiety, his health, diseases, intimate side of him —these are the main topics of the book. In this book, Shankar portrayed "The Monk" as "a man". The book is divided into five chapters (except "Foreword" and "Acknowledgement")—

1. A Monk and His Mother: this chapter discusses Vivekananda's relation with his mother, how he remained faithful to his mother always
2. Emperor, Monk and Cook in One: Vivekananda was a good cook always. This chapter discusses his cooking skill;
3. The Monk Who Loves Tea
4. Swamiji's Health
5. Thirty-nine Years, Five Months, and Twenty-four Days

== Publication ==
The books were first published in Bengali as Achena Ajana Vivekananda in November 2003 by Sahityam. Penguin Books translated and published the book in English in 2011. As of 2011, more than 100,000 copies of the Bengali version of the book were sold. The Bengali version of the book was a best-seller even in March 2014.
