= Bhakti yoga =

Devotional path to moksha in Hinduism

Bhakti yoga (Sanskrit: भक्ति योग), also called Bhakti marga (भक्ति मार्ग, literally the path of bhakti), is a spiritual path or spiritual practice within Hinduism focused on loving devotion towards any personal deity. It is one of the three classical paths in Hinduism which leads to moksha, the other paths being jnana yoga and karma yoga.

The tradition has ancient roots. Bhakti is mentioned in the Shvetashvatara Upanishad where it simply means participation, devotion and love for any endeavor. Bhakti yoga as one of three spiritual paths for salvation is discussed in depth by the Bhagavad Gita.

The personal god varies with the devotee. It may include a god or goddess such as Krishna, Radha, Rama, Sita, Vishnu, Shiva, Shakti, Lakshmi, Saraswati, Ganesha, Parvati, Durga, and Surya among others.

The bhakti marga involving these deities grew with the bhakti movement, starting about the mid-1st millennium CE, from Tamil Nadu in South India. The movement was led by the Saiva Nayanars and the Vaisnava Alvars. Their ideas and practices inspired bhakti poetry and devotion throughout India over the 12th-18th century CE. Bhakti marga is a part of the religious practice in Vaishnavism, Shaivism, and Shaktism.

== Philosophy ==
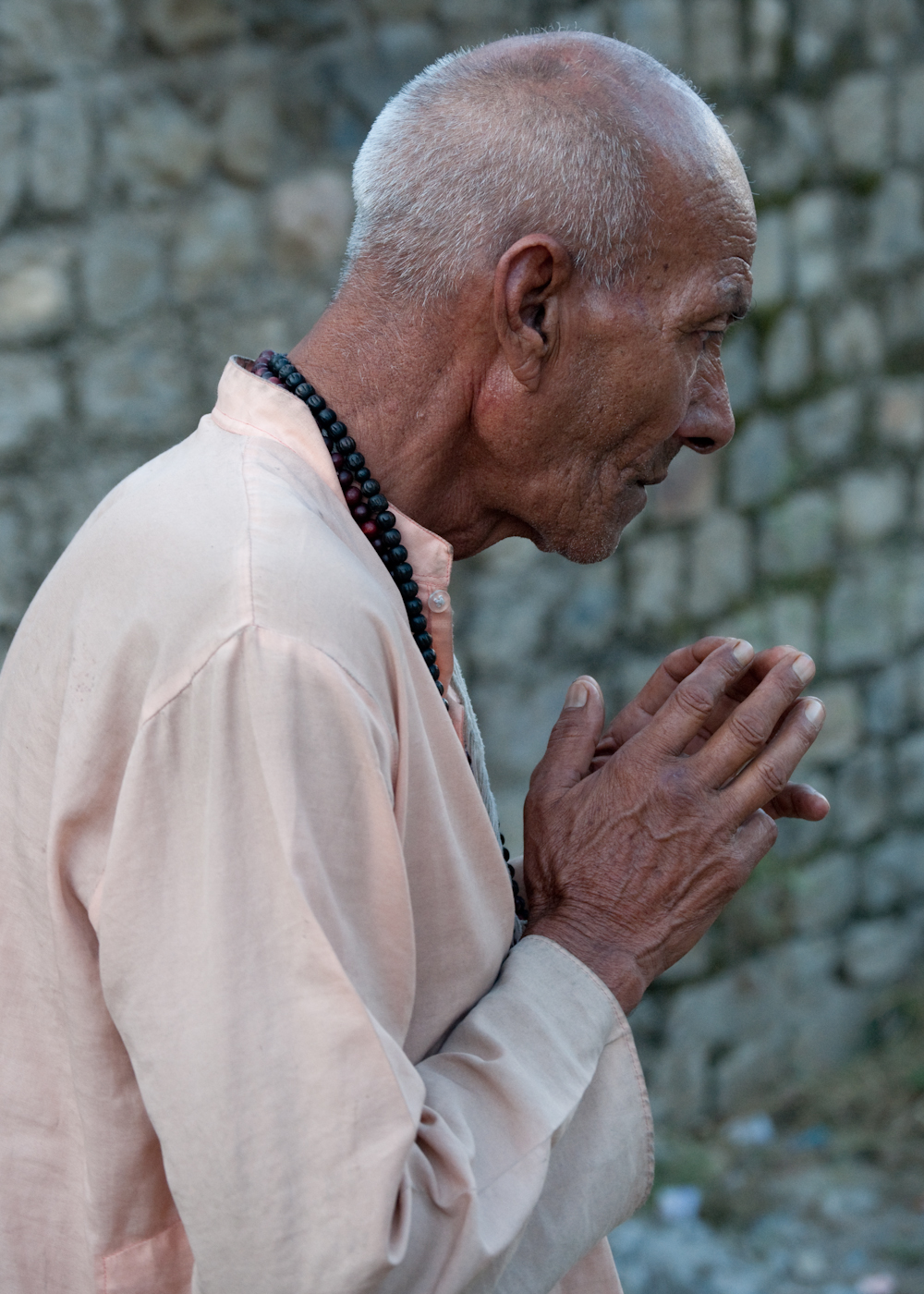
Bhakti yoga by a Hindu in Himachal Pradesh

The Sanskrit word bhakti is derived from the root bhaj, which means "divide, share, partake, participate, to belong to". The word also means "attachment, devotion to, fondness for, homage, faith or love, worship, piety to something as a spiritual, religious principle or means of salvation".

The term yoga literally means "union, yoke", and in this context connotes a path or practice for "salvation, liberation". The yoga referred to here is the "joining together, union" of one's Atman (true self) with the concept of Supreme Brahman (true Reality).

According to Samrat Kumar, bhakti yoga is an Indian tradition of "divine love mysticism", a spiritual path "synonymous for an intimate understanding of oneness and harmony of the eternal individual with the Divine (the universal Being) and all creatures, a constant delight". According to Yoga Journal, yoga scholar David Frawley writes in his book that bhakti yoga "consists of concentrating one's mind, emotions, and senses on the Divine."

=== Bhagavad Gita ===
Bhakti yoga is one of three yogas taught in Bhagavad Gita. Bhakti yoga is a devotee's loving devotion to a personal god as the path for spirituality. The other two paths are jnana yoga and karma yoga. Jnana yoga is the path of wisdom where the individual pursues knowledge and introspective self-understanding as spiritual practice, and karma yoga is the path of virtuous action (karma) where one acts without expecting rewards or consequences, also known as nishkama karma. Later, new movements within Hinduism added raja yoga as the fourth spiritual path, but this is not universally accepted as distinct to other three.

=== Bhagavata Purana ===
The Bhagavata Purana is a popular and influential text in the Vaishnavism traditions. It discusses Ishvara pranidhana (devotion to a personal god). Devotion is established as both the means of overcoming maya (illusion that causes one to mistakenly identify the self as the body) and the ultimate goal.

The Sanskrit text presents various modes of bhakti specifically to incarnations of Vishnu, particularly in terms of "Narayana, Krishna". According to Edwin Bryant, and other scholars, the Bhakti yoga taught in this text is inspired by Yoga Sutras of Patanjali and Bhagavad Gita, and they focus on "the ultimate truths of the individual self and its loving relationship with a personal god". The presentation in the Bhagavata Purana is not in abstract terms, but through "charming and delightful tales that capture the heart and mind", the goal of Bhakti yoga, states Bryant. According to Jonathan Edelmann, early Chaitanya Vaishnava theologians such as Sanātana, Rūpa, Jīva, and Viśvanātha invoked the authority of the Bhāgavata Purāna to recast devotion as an ethical imperative, positioning it as uniquely capable of revealing God's nature and salvific among the available paths, namely jñāna-yoga (the path of knowledge) and karma-yoga (the path of action).

The Uddhava Gita, which is the eleventh book of the Bhagavata Purana, discusses bhakti through a dialogue between Lord Krishna and Uddhava, his devotee. This text highlights the pure devotion and bhakti that the gopis of Vrindavan had for Lord Krishna.

== Traditions ==
Hinduism, in its scriptures such as Bhagavad Gita (chapter 7), recognizes four kinds of devotees who practice Bhakti yoga. Some practice it because they are hard pressed or stressed by anxiety or their life's circumstances and see Bhakti yoga as a form of relief. The second type practices Bhakti yoga to learn about god out of curiosity and intellectual intrigue. The third type seeks rewards in this or in afterlife through their Bhakti yoga. The fourth are those who love god driven by pure love, knowing and seeking nothing beyond that experience of love union.

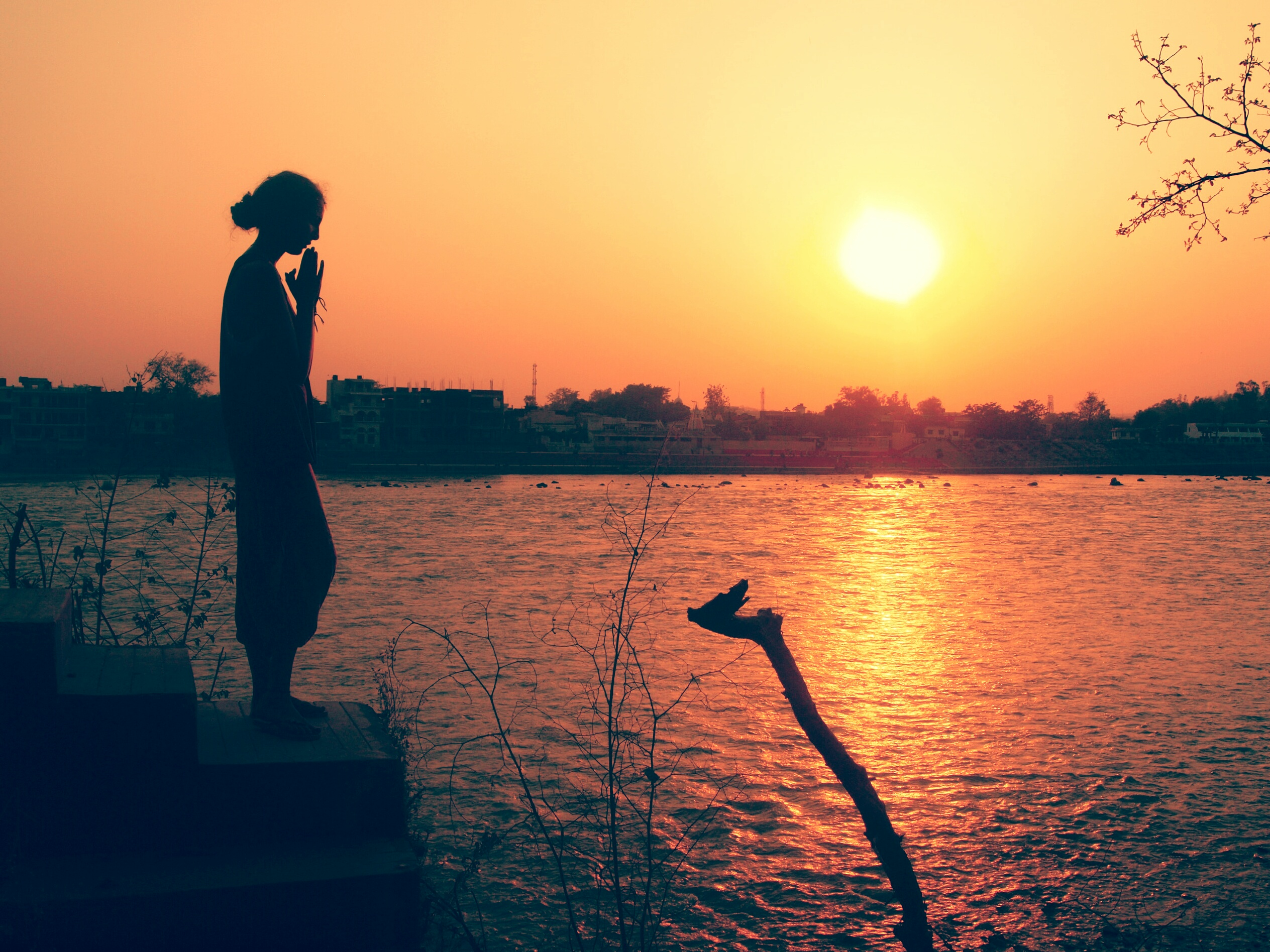
In Hinduism, the Bhakti yoga is a spiritual path of loving devotion to a Personal Divine.

According to these Hindu texts, the highest spiritual level is the fourth, those who are devoted because of their knowledge of love. The Bhagavad Gita states that all four types of Bhakti yogi are noble because their pursuit of Bhakti yoga sooner or later starts the journey on the path of spirituality, it keeps one away from negativity and evil karma, it causes spiritual transformation towards the goal of Bhakti yoga, to "know god as the essence within themselves and their true self always with god".

Major traditions include the Shaiva who worship the god Shiva; the Vaishnava who worship the god Vishnu (or his avatars such as Krishna and Rama); and the Shakta who worship the goddess Shakti (or her avatars such as Durga, Kali, Lakshmi, and Parvati). These are all considered manifestations or aspects of the same metaphysical reality called Brahman in Hinduism.

=== Panchayatana puja ===
Panchayatana puja is a form of bhakti found in the Smarta tradition of Hinduism. It consists of the simultaneous worship of multiple deities: Shiva, Vishnu, Shakti, Surya and an Ishta Devata such as Ganesha or Skanda or any personal god of devotee's preference.

Philosophically, the Smarta tradition emphasizes that all images (murti) are icons of saguna Brahman, a means to thinking about the abstract Ultimate Reality called nirguna Brahman. The five or six icons are seen by Smartas as multiple representations of the one Saguna Brahman (i.e., a personal God with form), rather than as distinct beings. The ultimate goal in this practice is to transition past the use of icons, then follow a philosophical and meditative path to understanding the oneness of Atman (soul, self) and Brahman – as "That art Thou".

=== Saiva Siddhanta ===
The Śaivasiddhānta tradition favors Bhakti yoga, emphasizing loving devotion to Shiva. Its theology presents three universal realities: the pashu (individual soul), the pati (lord, Shiva), and the pasha (soul's bondage) through ignorance, karma and maya. The tradition teaches ethical living, service to the community and through one's work, loving worship, yoga practice and discipline, continuous learning and self-knowledge as means for liberating the individual soul from bondage.

The historic Shaiva Siddhanta literature is an enormous body of texts. The Shaiva Siddhanta practices have focussed on abstract ideas of spirituality, worship and loving devotion to Shiva as SadaShiva, and taught the authority of the Vedas and Shaiva Agamas.

=== Shakti Bhakti ===
Bhakti toward the goddess is another significant tradition, one found in Shaktism. The theology of oneness and unity of "the divine Goddess and the devotee", their eternal fearless love for each other is a theme found in Devi Gita, a text embedded inside the Devi-Bhagavata Purana. The specific Bhakti yoga practices amongst Shakta are similar to those in other traditions of Hinduism. The Shakta devotion is common in eastern states of India, particularly West Bengal. The personal god here varies, and includes Durga, Tara Ma (Buddhist influence), Kali and to a lesser extent Saraswati, Lakshmi, Bharat Mata (land goddess), according to June McDaniel.

=== Vaishnava Bhakti ===
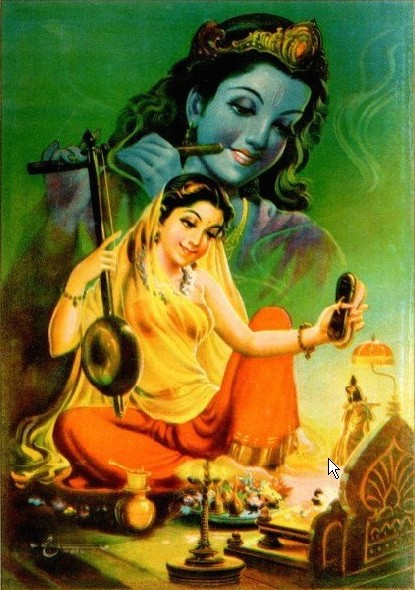
Mirabai is considered one of the most significant saints in the Vaishnava bhakti tradition.

The Bhakti yoga tradition has been historically most associated with Vaishnavism. The personal god here is Vishnu or one of his avatars. In many regions, the loving devotion is either to Vishnu-Lakshmi (god-goddess) together, or through Lakshmi who is considered the shakti of Vishnu. The specific avatar varies by the devotee and region, but the most common are Krishna and Rama.

==== Chaitanya Mahaprabhu ====
In the Krishna-oriented traditions of Vaishnavism, the Chaitanya Charitamrita by Krishnadasa Kaviraja interprets the section 7.5.23-24 of Bhagavata Purana to teach nine types of bhakti sadhana, in the words of Prahlada. David Haberman translates them as follows:

(1) śravaṇa ("listening" to the scriptural stories of Krishna and his companions), (2) kīrtana ("praising"; usually refers to ecstatic group singing), (3) smaraṇa ("remembering" or fixing the mind on Vishnu), (4) pāda-sevana (rendering service), (5) arcana (worshiping an image), (6) vandana (paying homage), (7) dāsya (servitude), (8) sākhya (friendship), and (9) ātma-nivedana (complete surrender of the self).

These nine principles of devotional service were incorporated by Rupa Goswami linked to Chaitanya Mahaprabhu as integral to spiritual practice focused on Krishna. The gopis practiced these forms of bhakti when they were separated from Krishna.

Rupa Goswami and Jiva Goswami have offered significant commentary on bhakti. Rupa established that "bhakti has the inherent nature of transcendental rasa extending to the pinnacle state of paramour conjugal love in the spontaneous loving devotional service of Vraja." Jiva aligns closely with this, stating that bhakti is the preeminent path to attaining perfection through service. The ultimate expression of bhakti is service to Krishna.

In the Bhakti Sandarbha, Jiva Goswami analyzes bhakti yoga by distinguishing between vaidhi bhakti and raganuga bhakti. Vaidhi bhakti represents a regulated form of devotion, where devotion is driven by adherence to scriptural injunctions and traditional practices. Raganuga bhakti represents a more exceptional form of devotion, emerging spontaneously from a natural, innate attraction to Ishvara (God), without relying on formalized practices. Raganuga bhakti, with its exclusive focus on Ishvara, represents the highest yogic attainment in Gaudiya Vaishnavism.

Notable later saints, such as Bhaktisiddhanta Sarasvati and Jagadguru Kripalu Ji Maharaj, have seconded the core beliefs of Raganuga bhakti and its utility in God realization. It is contrasting to other yogic paths like that described by Patanjali, where mundane desires are seen as obstacles.

=== Jagadguru Kripalu Ji Maharaj ===
Jagadguru Kripalu Bhaktiyog Tattvadarshan, the essence of Jagadguru Shri Kripalu Ji Maharaj's spiritual philosophy, posits that the ultimate goal of every living being is the attainment of infinite divine bliss, which resides exclusively in God. Material happiness is merely temporary and inevitably results in misery.

The soul, being an eternal part of God, inherently seeks this bliss. Attaining this supreme goal requires God's grace, which is received through complete surrender (sharanagati). This surrender primarily involves the surrender of the mind and requires detachment from the material world, gained by understanding its fleeting and illusory nature.

His book Prem Ras Siddhant states that while paths of action (karma) and knowledge (gyan) exist, devotion (bhakti) is the essential element and the most direct path to God. As per saints of the Bhakti movement, Bhakti is described as selfless love for God and automatically bestows divine knowledge and detachment.

Practical devotion involves exclusive, loving remembrance of God's divine form, names, and pastimes (Roopdhyan Meditation), often practiced while performing worldly duties (karmayoga). Guidance from a genuine saint (Guru) is crucial for navigating the path, and diligently avoiding bad association (kusanga) is paramount to prevent spiritual downfall.

=== Meher Baba ===
A movement led by Meher Baba states that "out of a number of practices which lead to the ultimate goal of humanity – God-Realization – Bhakti Yoga is one of the most important. Almost the whole of humanity is concerned with Bhakti Yoga, which, in simple words, means the art of worship. But it must be understood in all its true aspects, and not merely in a narrow and shallow sense, in which the term is commonly used and interpreted. The profound worship based on the high ideals of philosophy and spirituality, prompted by divine love, doubtless constitutes true Bhakti Yoga". Pashayan concurs that Bhakti Yogis are found on the mat, delivering pizza, in academia, and in politics and international relations. Where you least expect it, there's a Bhakti Yogi in the room with you whereby common ground can be actualized into productive solutions of today's salient issues, and problems can be resolved.

== See also ==
- Guru yoga
- Narada Bhakti Sutra
