= Conjugal love =

Love within a marital relationship

Conjugal love refers to love in a conjugal relationship, that is, in a marriage, since the word "conjugal" is defined as related to the relationship between married partners.

Marriage does not necessarily involve love between the partners. Christian views on marriage involve love as being central to the marriage relationship, just as Christianity views love as central to human life and human relationship to God (as illustration, the statement from the New Testament that "God is love".). The Christian expectation is that the physical act of making love in marriage will be integrated into a complete love between the two partners.

The Catholic Church, like the Orthodox Church, views marriage as a sacrament. The Catechism of the Catholic Church devotes a section to the topic of "conjugal love" (paragraphs 1643–1654). The first paragraph of that section states: "Conjugal love involves a totality, in which all the elements of the person enter – appeal of the body and instinct, power of feeling and affectivity, aspiration of the spirit and of will. It aims at a deeply personal unity, a unity that, beyond union in one flesh, leads to forming one heart and soul; it demands indissolubility and faithfulness in definitive mutual giving; and it is open to fertility. In a word it is a question of the normal characteristics of all natural conjugal love, but with a new significance which not only purifies and strengthens them, but raises them to the extent of making them the expression of specifically Christian values."

In the Old Testament book "The Song of Songs", a physical love affair between a man and a woman is described; Christians have generally taken this book as showing a picture of the love from God to people and their responding love for God. This interpretation implies that there is a strong connection between physical love in a marriage and the love between God and human beings.
