= Vedanta Philosophy: An address before the Graduate Philosophical Society =

1896 lecture by Swami Vivekananda

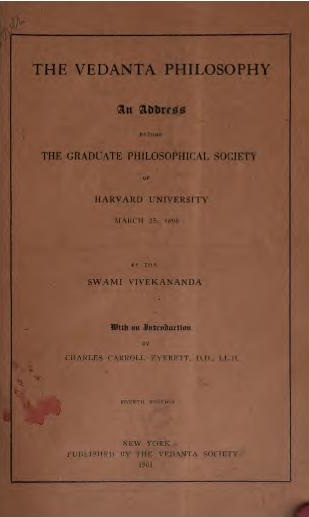
- Book cover of 1901 edition
- Author: Swami Vivekananda
- Language: English
- Subject: Philosophy
- Publisher: Cambridge University Press
- Publication date: 1896
- Pages: 58
- ISBN: 978-1-147-03379-3

Vedanta Philosophy: An address before the Graduate Philosophical Society is a lecture given by Swami Vivekananda on 25 March 1896 at the Graduate Philosophical Society of Harvard University. After this lecture, the university offered Vivekananda the chair of Eastern Philosophy.

== Background ==
Vivekananda attended the Parliament of the World's Religions in 1893 as a representative of Vedanta, Hinduism, and India. There, his lectures won the admiration and interest of the public. For the next four years, Vivekananda gave a series of lectures in different cities of America and England. On 25 March 1896, Vivekananda gave a lecture on Vedanta philosophy at the Graduate Philosophical Society of Harvard University. The lecture was recorded stenographically. Later that same year, the lecture was published as a book by the Cambridge University Press. After this lecture, Vivekananda was offered the chair of Eastern Philosophy, but he declined the offer.

== Synopsis ==
In this lecture, Vivekananda discussed Vedantic philosophy in detail. He talked on the history of Vedanta, the role of Vedanta in human life, different branches of Vedanta, dualism, non-dualism, the nature of human mind, human will power, and so on.

In the course of his lecture, Vivekananda drew a comparison between the mentalities of Eastern and Western people. He expressed the opinion that Eastern civilization is much older than Western civilization and that, in consequence, Eastern civilization is more merciful whereas Western civilization is more cruel. Vivekananda opined that in the West, the "culture of the heart" had not kept pace with the acquisition of power. Vivekananda also observed that in the West, few persons develop the power to control their own mind. According to Vivekananda, "It will take time to make [Western people] gentle and good."
