= A Bouquet of Swami Vivekananda's Writings =

- Author: Swami Vivekananda
- Language: English
- Published: 2013
- Publisher: Advaita Ashrama
- Publication place: India
- Media type: Print
- Pages: 310
- ISBN: 978-8175054004
- LC Class: BL1280.292.V58 A25

A Bouquet of Swami Vivekananda's Writings is a book created by compiling original handwritten works of Swami Vivekananda.

== Content ==
The 310-page book is full of handwritten pieces of Swami Vivekananda. Most of these are letters written to Vivekananda's friends and disciples in India and abroad. There are also poems and prose manuscripts.

== Publication ==
The book was published in 2013 by Advaita Ashrama. The first edition of the book was sold in a subsidized rate by the publication. During the book launch event in July 2013, Swami Prabhananda, vice-president of the Math, hoped that this book will bring people closer to Vivekananda and his ideals.
