= Three Yogas =

Soteriological paths in Hinduism

The Three Yogas or Trimārga are three soteriological paths introduced in the Bhagavad Gita for the liberation of human spirit. They are:

1. Karma Yoga or the 'Path of Action' (Karma-mārga)
2. Bhakti Yoga or the 'Path of Devotion' (Bhakti-mārga) to Ishvar (God)
3. Jnana Yoga or the 'Path of Knowledge' (Jñāna-mārga)

A "fourth yoga" is sometimes added:

4. Raja Yoga or the 'Path of Meditation' (Raja-mārga), making 'Four Yogas', also known as the 'Four Paths'

Hindu philosophers of the medieval period have tried to explain the nature of these three paths and the relation between them.

Shankara tended to focus on jñāna-yoga exclusively, which he interpreted as the acquisition of knowledge or vidya.

The 12th-century philosopher Ramanuja considered the three yogas by interpreting his predecessor Yamunacharya. In Ramanujam's interpretation, Bhakti yoga appears to be the direct path to moksha, which is however available only to those whose inner faculties have already been trained by both Karma yoga and Jnana yoga.

A "fourth yoga" is sometimes added, Raja Yoga or "the Path of Meditation". This is the classical Yoga presented in the Yoga Sutras of Patanjali. Patanjali's system came to be known as Raja Yoga (Royal Yoga) retro-actively, in about the 15th century, as the term Yoga had become popular for the general concept of a "religious path".

The systematic presentation of Hindu monotheism as divided into these four paths or "Yogas" is modern, advocated by Swami Vivekananda from the 1890s in his book Raja Yoga. They are presented as four paths to God suitable for four human temperaments, viz. the active, the emotional, the philosophical and the mystic.
