= Sister Gargi =

American nun and researcher on Swami Vivekananda

- Sister Gargi
- Born: Marie Louise Burke; June 23, 1912; United States
- Died: January 20, 2004 (aged 91); San Francisco, United States
- Other names: Pravrajika Prajnaprana
- Occupations: Nun; writer; researcher
- Known for: Research on Swami Vivekananda

Sister Gargi (Bengali: [sister ɡaːrɡiː]; June 23, 1912 – January 20, 2004), born Marie Louise Burke, was a writer and an eminent researcher on Swami Vivekananda, and a leading literary figure of the Ramakrishna-Vivekananda movement. Gargi was introduced to the Ramakrishna-Vivekananda movement in 1948 by Swami Ashokananda. She is known for her six-volume work, Swami Vivekananda in the West: New Discoveries. Her New Discoveries are considered as indispensable for Swami Vivekananda research.

== Biography ==
Marie Louise Burke was born in 1912 in the United States.

=== Religious life ===
In 1948, she was introduced to the Ramakrishna-Vivekananda movement by Swami Ashokananda. In 1957, Advaita Ashrama published her biography of Swami Vivekananda, Swami Vivekananda in the West: New Discoveries in two volumes, well known in the Vedanta circles, and the book was later greatly expanded and published in six volumes in 1983—87. She also wrote articles in Vedanta journals.

In 1974 in India, Burke became a nun when she took her vows of Brahmacharya from the Ramakrishna Order. At that time, she was given the monastic name "Gargi" (this name was inspired by Vedic scholar Gargi). In 1983, Burke was awarded the first Vivekananda Award by the Ramakrishna Order for her research works on Swami Vivekananda. Later she took her final vows of Sannyasa, and was given the name Pravrajika Prajnaprana.

The convents at the Vedanta Society of Northern California and the Vedanta Society of Southern California are the only two sanctioned convents of the Ramakrishna Order, and only a few dozen women have taken final monastic vows, since the convents were established in the 1950s. In India, a separate Order was established for women: Sri Sarada Math.

Burke continued writing even in her 90s and continued living at Convent of the Vedanta Society of Northern California in San Francisco. She died on January 20, 2004, after suffering from cancer, at the convent.

=== Author ===
Gargi was encouraged to write by her teacher, Swami Ashokananda. He asked her to write about Swami Vivekananda, but told her she could write about himself when she was finished with her work on Vivekananda.

==== Swami Vivekananda in the West: New Discoveries ====
Swami Vivekananda in the West: New Discoveries, a series of biographical books, were Gargi's most prominent work. This series of book were first published in two volumes in 1957. In 1983-87, these series was republished in six volumes. Swami Vivekananda spent a number of years teaching and lecturing in the West (specially in America and England). Gargi researched for many years and then published her findings in these works.

She wrote about Vivekananda's spiritual quest— "Quite literally, he planted the seeds of spirituality deep in the hearts of innumerable human beings, changing the course of their lives forever... He was a prophet who prepared us to meet the modern age, which not only needs philosophy or Vedanta to solve its many and complex problems but requires thousands of spiritually awakened people to put that philosophy into practice and make it a living force in the future history of the world."

==== Books on Swami Ashokananda ====
Gargi wrote multiple books on the life of Swami Ashokananda (1893—1969), a monk of the Ramakrishna Order who spent his life expanding the Ramakrishna—Vivekananda movement in northern California. Ashokananda was Gargi's teacher, who initiated her into the Ramakrishna-Vivekananda movement in 1948.

In 2003 her book A Heart Poured Out: A Story of Swami Ashokananda was published. In this book, she discussed the life of Swami Ashokananda. She explained the reason of writing a book on Ashokananda in this book's preface—

Why, then, have I tried to write about Swami Ashokananda, who habitually dwelt in high altitudes of the Spirit where we cannot or think we cannot, follow? I write about him because in whatever height he had has moorings, his heart beat in tune with that of every human being who aspires upward, and he led us with a firm and unerring hand into his own realm, where, he was convinced, we all belong. In short, I have written about him because he was an authentic spiritual teacher whom each of us can benefit by knowing.

In the 2004 book Shafts of Light: Selected Teachings of Swami Ashokananda for Spiritual Practice, Gargi presented Swami Ashokananda ideals and selected teachings. The 2003 book A Disciple's Journal: In the Company of Swami Ashokananda had autobiographical components.

==== Other books ====
Swami Trigunatita: His Life and Work was published from Vedanta Society of Northern California in 1997. In this book, she discussed the life and works of Ramakrishna Order monk Swami Trigunatitananda. In the book Vedantic Tales, published from Advaita Ashram in 2000 she narrated tales of Vedanta and ancient India. Gargi's 2003 book A Disciple's Journal: In the Company of Swami Ashokananda tells of her personal experiences during her spiritual instruction from Swami Ashokananda, from 1950 until his death in 1969.

== Awards and honours ==
- 1983, Vivekananda Award

== Selected works ==
- Swami Vivekananda in the West: New Discoveries 6 volumes, translated into Bengali as Paschatye Vivekananda (6 volumes), Advaita Ashrama, Kolkata.
- Swami Vivekananda: Prophet of the Modern Age ISBN 81-87332-04-2
- A Heart Poured Out: A Story of Swami Ashokananda. Kalpa Tree Press. 2003. ISBN 978-0-9706368-1-2.
- Shafts of Light: Selected Teachings of Swami Ashokananda for Spiritual Practice. Kalpa Tree Press. 2004. ISBN 978-0-9706368-3-6.
- Swami Trigunatita: His Life and Work. Vedanta Society of Northern California. 1997. ISBN 978-0-9612388-3-4.
- Vedantic Tales. Advaita Ashram. 2000. ISBN 978-81-7505-136-2.
- A Disciple's Journal: In the Company of Swami Ashokananda. Kalpa Tree Press. 2003. ISBN 978-0-9706368-2-9.

== See also ==
- Eugene Chelyshev
- Sister Nivedita
