= Karma Yoga (book) =

Book of lectures by Shree Swami Vivekananda, published in 1896

- Karma Yoga of Swami Vivekananda front cover
- Author: Swami Vivekananda
- Language: English
- Subject: Philosophy
- Publication date: 1896

Karma Yoga (lit. 'The Yoga of action') is a book of lectures by Swami Vivekananda, as transcribed by Joseph Josiah Goodwin. It was published in February 1896 in New York City. Swami Vivekananda delivered a number of lectures in his rented rooms at 228 W 39th Street in New York City from December 1895 to January 1896. In 1895, friends and supporters of Swami Vivekananda hired Goodwin, a professional stenographer, who transcribed some of the lectures which were later published as this book. Goodwin later became a follower of Vivekananda.

== Theme ==
The main topic of the book was Karma (work) and Karma Yoga. Swami Vivekananda discussed the concept of Karma in the Bhagavada Gita. Swami Vivekananda described Karma Yoga as a mental discipline that allows a person to carry out his/her duties as a service to the entire world, as a path to enlightenment.

== Chapters ==
- Karma in its Effect on Character
- Each is great in his own place
- The Secret of Work
- What is Duty?
- We help ourselves, not the world
- Non-attachment is complete self-abnegation
- Freedom
- The Ideal of Karma-Yoga
