= Life and Philosophy of Swami Vivekananda =

Biography

Life And Philosophy Of Swami Vivekananda
- Front cover
- Author: G. S Banhatti
- Genre: Biography
- Publisher: Atlantic Publishers & Dist, New Delhi
- Publication place: India
- ISBN: 978-81-7156-291-6
- OCLC: 463616534

Life and Philosophy of Swami Vivekananda (1989) is a biography of Swami Vivekananda written by G. S. Banhatti. It was published by Atlantic Publishers & Dist, New Delhi in 1995.

== Content ==
The book is divided into several chapters, each dealing with a significant aspect of Vivekananda's life. For example, the first chapter deals with his birth, childhood and early school life and the second chapter, entitled "Spiritual apprenticeship", with his spiritual development as a disciple of Ramakrishna. The last two chapters of the book discuss prose and poetry written by Vivekananda.
