= Karma yoga =

Spiritual path in Hinduism

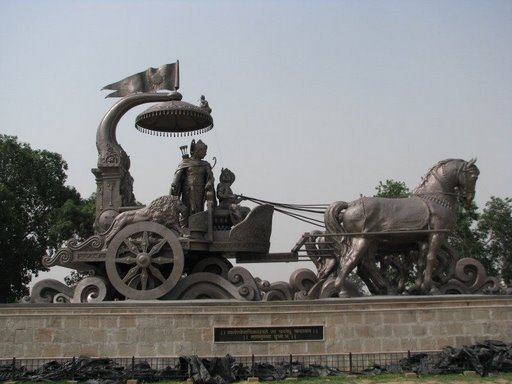
Bronze statue representing the discourse of Bhagavan Krishna and Arjuna, in Kurukshetra

Karma yoga (Sanskrit: कर्म योग), also called Karma marga, is one of the three classical spiritual paths mentioned in the Bhagavad Gita, one based on the "yoga of action", the others being Jnana yoga (path of knowledge) and Bhakti yoga (path of loving devotion to a personal god). To a karma yogi, right action is a form of prayer. The paths are not mutually exclusive in Hinduism, but the relative emphasis between Karma yoga, Jnana yoga and Bhakti yoga varies by the individual.

Of the classical paths to spiritual liberation in Hinduism, karma yoga is the path of unselfish action. It teaches that a spiritual seeker should act according to dharma, without being attached to the fruits or personal consequences. Karma Yoga, states the Bhagavad Gita, purifies the mind. It leads one to consider dharma of work, and the work according to one's dharma, doing god's work and in that sense becoming and being "like unto god Krishna" in every moment of one's life.

== Concept ==
According to Krishna in the Bhagavad Gita, Karma yoga is the spiritual practice of "selfless action performed for the benefit of others". Karma yoga is a path to reach moksha (spiritual liberation) through work. It is rightful action without being attached to fruits or being manipulated by what the results might be, a dedication to one's duty, and trying one's best while being neutral to rewards or outcomes such as success or failure. Within Hinduism, this concept is known as seva, meaning selfless service to others as a means of spiritual practice.

The tendency of a human being to seek the fruits of action is normal, state Hindu texts, but an exclusive attachment to fruits and positive immediate consequences can compromise dharma (ethical, rightful action). Karma yoga, states Bilimoria, is "ethically fine-tuned action". According to Stephen Phillips, a professor of philosophy and Asian studies, "only dharmic action" is suitable in karma yoga, in which one downplays one's own exclusive role or one's own exclusive interests. Instead, the karma yogi considers the interests of all parties impartially, all beings, the elements of Prakṛti and then does the right thing. However, adds Phillips, there are commentators who disagree and state "any action can be done as karma yoga" and it doesn't have to be consistent with dharma.

Karma yoga

Your work is your responsibility,
not its result.
Never let the fruits of your actions
be your motive.
Nor give in to inaction.

Set firmly in yourself, do your work,
not attached to anything.
Remain evenminded in success,
and in failure.
Evenmindedness is true yoga.

— Bhagavad Gita, 2.47-49

Karma yoga, states Bilimoria, does not mean forfeiture of emotions or desires, rather it means action driven by "equanimity, balance", with "dispassion, disinterest", avoiding "one sidedness, fear, craving, favoring self or one group or clan, self-pity, self-aggrandizement or any form of extreme reactiveness". A Karma yogi acts and does his or her duty, whether that be as "a homemaker, mother, nurse, carpenter or garbage collector, with no thought for one's own fame, privilege or financial reward, but simply as a dedication to the Lord", states Harold Coward – professor of Religious Studies with a focus on Indian religions.

According to Phillips, Karma yoga applies to "any action in any profession or family activities", in which the yogi works selflessly to others' benefit. This is in contrast to other forms of yoga that focus on self-development and self-realization, typically with isolation and meditative introspection. The "disinterested action" idea, states Phillips, is not unique to Hinduism, and similar disinterested non-craving precepts for monks and nuns are found in Buddhism and Jainism.

=== Bhagavad Gita ===
The Bhagavad Gita gives a summary of the karma yoga process. According to the Bhagavad Gita, selfless service to the right cause and like-minded others, with the right feeling and right attitude, is a form of worship and spirituality. (Note: The first six chapters of the Bhagavad Gita discuss Karma yoga, chapters 7-12 focus on Bhakti yoga, while chapters 13-18 describe the Jnana yoga.) In verse 3.19, Krishna says:

"tasmad asaktah satatam karyam karma samacara asakto hy acaran karma param apnoti purushah"

Translation:

Therefore, without being attached to the results of activities, one should act as a matter of duty, for by working without attachment one attains the Supreme.

Translation:

Verse 3.4 of the Bhagavad Gita states that avoiding work or not starting work is not the path to become free of bondage, just as renouncing the world and wearing monk's dress does not automatically make one spiritual. Verse 3.5 further clarifies that inactivity is impossible for any living beings and the nature of existence is such that living beings are always acting in their environment, body or mind, and never for a moment are they not, according to verse 3.5. The verses 3.6 to 3.8 of the Bhagavad Gita state that the action can be motivated by body or manipulated by external influences. Alternatively, it can be motivated by one's inner reflection and true self (soul, Atman, Brahman). The former creates bondage, the latter empowers freedom. The spiritual path to the liberated state of bliss is to do the best one is able to while being detached to outcomes, to fruits, to success or failure. A karma yogi who practices such nishkama karma (niṣkāmakarma), states Bhawuk, is following "an inward journey, which is inherently fulfilling and satisfying".

A part of the premise of "disinterested action" is that the more one acts with the hope of getting rewards, the more one is liable to disappointment, frustration or self-destructive behavior. Further, another part of the premise is that the more one is committed to "disinterested action", the more one considers the dharma (ethical dimension), focuses on other aspects of the action, strives to do one's best, and this leads to liberating self-empowerment.

According to chapter 5 of the Bhagavad Gita, both sannyasa (renunciation, monastic life) and karma yoga are means to liberation. Between the two, it recommends karma yoga, stating that anyone who is a dedicated karma yogi neither hates nor desires, and therefore such a person is the "eternal renouncer".

=== Other Hindu texts ===
The earliest texts that are forerunners of the karma yoga ideas in the Bhagavad Gita are the ancient Upanishads, such as the Brihadaranyaka Upanishad. Other Vedic texts as well as post-Vedic literature of the Mimamsa school of Hindu philosophy mention karma marga, but these contextually refer to the path of rituals. According to Raju, the Mimamsa ideas, though orthodox, were the fertile grounds on which the later ideas of Karma yoga developed.

Karma yoga is discussed in many other Hindu texts. For example, the section 11.20 of the Bhagavata Purana states that there are only three means to spiritual liberation: jnana yoga (knowledge), karma yoga (action) and bhakti yoga (devotion). Those who are of philosophical bent, prefer the "knowledge path". Those who are inclined to productive application of arts, skills and knowledge, prefer the "karma path". Those who prefer emotional connection, prefer the "devotional path". These three paths overlap, with different relative emphasis.

Discussions on Karma yoga are also found in chapter 33 of Narada Purana.

== Karma yoga versus Kriya yoga ==
While karma yoga is delineated as the "yoga of action," kriya yoga is the "yoga of ritual action". Kriya yoga is found in tantric texts, and believed by its practitioners to activate chakra and energy centers in the body through disciplined breathing practices.

== See also ==
- Flow (psychology)
- Taṇhā – greed, craving
- Three poisons – three afflictions mentioned in Buddhist texts as what entrap people into the cycle of rebirths and sufferings
- Trul khor

== Sources ==
- Jeaneane D. Fowler (2012). The Bhagavad Gita: A Text and Commentary for Students, Chapter 3. Sussex Academic Press. ISBN 978-1-84519-520-5. OCLC 748941730.
