= Jñāna yoga =

One of three classical paths for moksha in Hinduism

Jnana yoga (IAST: Jñāna yoga), also known as jnana marga (jñāna mārga), is one of the three classical paths (margas) for moksha (liberation) in the Bhagavad Gita, which emphasizes the "path of knowledge" or the "path of self-realization". The other two are karma yoga (path of action, karma-mārga) and bhakti yoga (path of loving devotion to a personal god, bhakti-mārga). Modern interpretations of Hindu texts have led the fourfold classification to include Raja yoga, that is, meditation as described in the Yoga Sutras of Patanjali.

Jñāna yoga is a spiritual practice that pursues knowledge through questions such as 'Who am I?' and 'What am I?' among others. The practitioner studies usually with the aid of a guru, meditates, reflects, and reaches liberating insights on the nature of the Self (Atman, soul) and its relationship to the metaphysical concept called Brahman in Hinduism. The jñāna-mārga ideas are discussed in ancient and medieval-era Hindu scriptures and texts such as the Upanishads and the Bhagavad Gita.

== Etymology ==
Jnana, sometimes transcribed as gyaan or gnan, means "knowledge" in Sanskrit. The root jna- is cognate to the English know, as well as to the Greek γνώ- (as in γνῶσις gnosis). Its antonym is ajnana "ignorance".

== Definition ==
Jnana is knowledge, which refers to any cognitive event that is correct and true over time. It particularly refers to knowledge inseparable from the total experience of its object, especially about reality (non-theistic schools) or a supreme being (theistic schools). In Hinduism, it is knowledge which gives Moksha, or spiritual liberation while alive (jivanmukti) or after death (videhamukti). Jñāna yoga is the path towards attaining jnana.

It is one of the three classical types of yoga mentioned in Hindu philosophies, the other two being karma yoga and bhakti. In modern classifications, classical yoga, being called Raja yoga, is mentioned as a fourth one, an extension introduced by Swami Vivekananda.

Classical yoga emphasizes the practice of dhyana (meditation), and this is an element of all three classical paths in Hinduism, including jñāna yoga. In the Bhagavad Gita, jnana is equated with samkhya (yoga), the discernment of purusha, pure consciousness, as different from prakriti, matter and material desires. This discernment is possible when the mind has been calmed by the practice of dhyana, meditation.

According to Jones and Ryan, jnana in jnana yoga context is better understood as "realization or gnosis", referring to a "path of study" wherein one knows the unity between self and ultimate reality called Brahman in Hinduism. This explanation is found in the ancient Upanishads and the Bhagavad Gita. This is typical for Advaita Vedanta, where jnana involves the recognition of the identity of jivatman and Brahman. According to Bimal Matilal, jnana yoga in Advaita Vedanta connotes both primary and secondary sense of its meaning, that is "self-consciousness, awareness" in the absolute sense and relative "intellectual understanding" respectively. While contemporary Advaita Vedanta and neo-Vedanta incorporate meditation, Adi Shankara relied on insight alone, based on the Mahavakya. Neo-Advaita also emphasizes direct insight. (Note: See for example H. W. L. Poonja, who regarded knowledge alone to be enough for liberation.)

Of the three different paths to liberation, jnana marga and karma marga are the more ancient, traceable to Vedic era literature. All three paths are available to any seeker, chosen based on inclination, aptitude and personal preference, and typically elements of all three to varying degrees are practiced by many Hindus.

The path of knowledge is intended for those who prefer philosophical reflection, and it requires study and meditation.

Jnana yoga encourages its adepts to think and speak of themselves in the third person as a way to distance themselves from the Ego and detach their eternal self (atman) from the body related one (maya).

== Upanishads ==
In the Upanishads, jnana yoga aims at the realization of the oneness of the individual self (Atman) and the ultimate Self (Brahman). These teachings are found in the early Upanishads. According to Chambliss, the mystical teachings within these Upanishads discuss "the way of knowledge of the Self", a union, the realization that the Self (Atman) and the Brahman are logical.

The teachings in the Upanishads have been interpreted in a number of ways, ranging from non-theistic monism to theistic dualism. In former, rituals are not necessary, and a path of introspection and meditation is emphasized for the correct knowledge (jnana) of self. In latter, it is the full and correct knowledge of a Vishnu avatar or Shiva or Shakti (Goddess) that is emphasized. In all its various interpretations, the paths are not necessarily mutually exclusive. A Jnana yogi may also practice Karma yoga or Bhakti yoga or both, and differing levels of emphasis.

According to Robert Roeser, the precepts of Jnana yoga in Hinduism were likely systematized by about 500 BCE, earlier than Karma yoga and Bhakti yoga.

== Bhagavad Gita ==
In the Bhagavad Gita, jnana yoga is also referred to as buddhi yoga and its goal is self-realization. The text considers jnana marga as the most difficult, slow, confusing for those who prefer it because it deals with "formless reality". It is the path that intellectually oriented people tend to prefer.

The chapter 4 of the Bhagavad Gita is dedicated to the general exposition of Jnana yoga, while chapters 7 and 16 discuss its theological and axiological aspects. Krishna says that jñāna is the purest, and a discovery of one's Atman:

Truly, there is nothing here as pure as knowledge. In time, he who is perfected in yoga finds that in his own Atman.

— Bhagavad Gita 4.38, Translator: Jeaneane D. Fowler

== Traditions ==
The Advaita philosopher Adi Shankara gave primary importance to jñāna yoga for the "knowledge of the absolute" (Brahman), while the Vishishtadvaita commentator Ramanujar perceived knowledge only as a condition of devotion.

=== Classical Advaita Vedanta ===
==== Behaviors ====
Classical Advaita Vedanta emphasises the path of Jnana Yoga to attain moksha. It consists of fourfold attitudes, or behavioral qualifications:

1. Discrimination (Nityānitya vastu viveka (नित्यानित्य वस्तु विवेकम्), or simply viveka) — The ability to correctly discern (viveka) between the unchanging, permanent, eternal (nitya) and the changing, transitory, temporary (anitya).
2. Dispassion of fruits (Ihāmutrārtha phala bhoga virāga (इहाऽमुत्रार्थ फल भोगविरागम्), or simply vairagya) — The dispassionate indifference (vairagya) to the fruits, to enjoyments of objects (artha phala bhoga) or to the other worlds (amutra) after rebirth.
3. Six virtues (Śamādi ṣatka sampatti (शमादि षट्क सम्पत्ति), or simply satsampat) —
  1. Śama, temperance of mind
  2. Dama, temperance of sense organs (voluntary self-restraints (Note: Example self-restraints mentioned in Hindu texts: one must refrain from any violence that causes injury to others, refrain from starting or propagating deceit and falsehood, refrain from theft of other's property, refrain from sexually cheating on one's partner, and refrain from avarice.))
  3. Uparati, withdrawal of mind from sensory objects (Note: nivartitānāmeteṣāṁ tadvyatiriktaviṣayebhya uparamaṇamuparatirathavā vihitānāṁ karmaṇāṁ vidhinā parityāgaḥ[Vedāntasāra, 21])
  4. Titikṣa, forbearance
  5. Śraddhā, faith
  6. Samādhāna, concentration of mind
4. Drive, longing (Mumukṣutva (मुमुक्षुत्वम्)) — intense yearning for moksha from the state of ignorance

==== Practices ====
Jnanayoga for Advaitins consists of three practices: sravana (hearing), manana (thinking) and nididhyasana (meditation). This three-step methodology is rooted in the teachings of chapter 4 of the Brihadaranyaka Upanishad:

- Sravana literally means hearing, and broadly refers to perception and observations typically aided by a counsellor or teacher (guru), wherein the Advaitin listens and discusses the ideas, concepts, questions and answers.
- Manana refers to thinking on these discussions and contemplating over the various ideas based on svadhyaya and sravana.
- Nididhyāsana refers to meditation, (Note: Oxford Index, nididhyāsana) realization and consequent conviction of the truths, non-duality and a state where there is a fusion of thought and action, knowing and being.

These practices, with the help of a guru are believed to lead to correct knowledge, which destroys avidya, psychological and perceptual errors related to Atman and Brahman.

=== Shaivism ===
Both the theistic and monistic streams of Shaivism include jnana yoga ideas, along with those related to karma yoga, and in the case of Saiva Siddhanta ideas related to bhakti yoga. The Shaivism traditions do not consider renunciation necessary for practicing jnana yoga, leaving ascetic yogi lifestyle optional. Spirituality can be pursued along with active life (karma), according to Shaiva traditions, and it believes that this does not hinder ones ability to journey towards self (Shiva within) realization. The traditions dwell into this integration of karma yoga with jnana yoga, such as by ranking daily behavior and activity that is done by choice and when not necessary as higher in spiritual terms than activity that is impulsive or forced.

The methodology of sravana, manana and nididhyasana similar to Advaita Vedanta are also found in various traditions of Shaivism. However, nistha or samadhi is sometimes added in Shaiva methodology. The meditational aspects of Shaivism focus on the nirguna form of Supreme Reality (Shiva).

=== Vaishnavism ===
The Pancharatra (agama) texts of Vaishnavism, along with its Bhagavata (Krishna, Rama, Vishnu) tradition, are strongly influenced by jnana yoga ideas of the Upanishads. However, Vaishnavism also incorporates Bhakti yoga concepts of loving devotion to the divine Supreme personally selected by the devotee, in saguna form, both in silent meditational and musical expressive styles.

The aim of jnana yoga in Vaishnavism differs from that in other schools. Advaita, for example, considers jnana yoga as the path to nondual self-knowledge and moksha. Vaishnavism, in contrast, considers it a condition of devotion.

=== Shaktism ===
The Shaktism literature on goddess such as Kularnava Tantra highlight jnana marga as important to liberation. It differentiates between two kinds of jnana: one it calls knowledge that comes from Agama texts, and another it names viveka (insight). The Shaktism literature then adds that both lead to the knowledge of Brahman, but the first one is in the form of sound (shabdabrahman), while the insight from within is the ultimate truth (parabrahman).

Some Shakta texts, such as the Sita Upanishad, combine yoga of action and knowledge as a path to liberation. The Devi Gita, a classic text of Shaktism, dedicates chapter 4 to Jnana yoga, stating that a Jnana yogi understands and realizes that there is no difference between the individual soul and herself as the supreme Self. The discussion of Jnana yoga continues through the later chapters of the Devi Gita.

== See also ==
- Bhakti yoga
- Diamond Sutra Perfection of Wisdom
- Nididhyasana
- Ramana Maharshi
- Yoga Vasistha
- Yoga Sutras of Patanjali

== Sources ==
Printed sources

- Apte, Vaman Shivram (1965), The Practical Sanskrit Dictionary, Delhi: Motilal Banarsidass Publishers, ISBN 81-208-0567-4 (Fourth revised and enlarged edition).
- Basu, Asoke (June 2004). "Advaita Vedanta and Ethics". Religion East and West (4): 91–105.
- Dalal, Neil (2009). "Contemplative Practice and Textual Agency in Advaita Vedanta". Method and Theory in the Study of Religion. 21: 15–27. doi:10.1163/157006809X416788.
- Deutsch, Eliot (1973), Advaita Vedanta: A Philosophical Reconstruction, University of Hawaii Press, ISBN 978-0-8248-0271-4
- Feuerstein, Georg (2001). The Yoga Tradition: Its History, Literature, Philosophy and Practice. Prescott, Arizona: Hohm Press. ISBN 1-890772-18-6. (Unabridged, New Format Edition).
- Flood, Gavin (1996), An Introduction to Hinduism, Cambridge: Cambridge University Press, ISBN 0-521-43878-0
- Jones, Constance; Ryan, James D., eds. (2006), Encyclopedia of Hinduism, Infobase Publishing
- Mayeda, Sengaku (1992), "An Introduction to the Life and Thought of Sankara", in Mayeda, Sengaku (ed.), A Thousand Teachings: The Upadeśasāhasrī of Śaṅkara, State University of New York City Press, ISBN 0-7914-0944-9
- Matilal, Bimal Krishna (2005), "Jnana", in Jones, Lindsay (ed.), MacMillan Encyclopedia of Religions, MacMillan
- De Michelis, Elizabeth (2005), A History of Modern Yoga, Continuum
- Puligandla, Ramakrishna (1985). Jñâna-Yoga—The Way of Knowledge (An Analytical Interpretation). New York: University Press of America. ISBN 0-8191-4531-9.
- Puligandla, Ramakrishna (1997), Fundamentals of Indian Philosophy, New Delhi: D.K. Printworld
- Varenne, Jean; Derek Coltman (1976). Yoga and the Hindu Tradition. Chicago: The University of Chicago Press. ISBN 0-226-85114-1.

Web-sources
