= Yajurveda =

Scripture of Hinduism

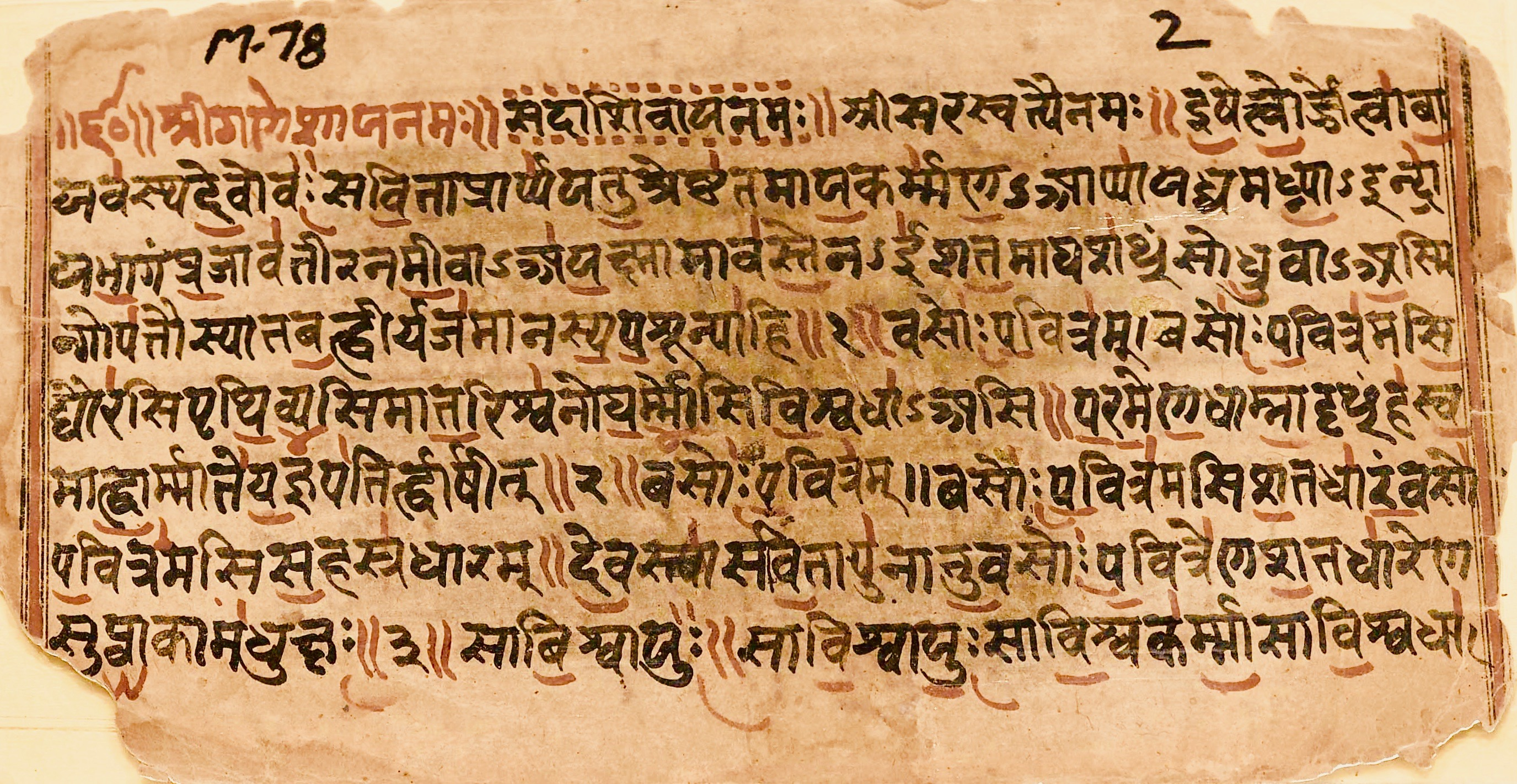
- A page from the Vajasneyi samhita found in the Shukla Yajurveda (Sanskrit, Devanagari script). This version of the manuscript opens with salutations to Ganesha and Sadashiva (Shaivism).

Information
- Religion: Vedic religion Hinduism
- Language: Vedic Sanskrit
- Period: Vedic period (c. 1200–800 BCE)
- Chapters: 40 Adhyayas (chapters)
- Verses: 1,975 Mantras

The Yajurveda (Sanskrit: यजुर्वेद, IAST: yajurveda, from यजुस्, "worship", and वेद, "knowledge") is the Veda primarily of prose mantras for worship rituals. An ancient Vedic Sanskrit text, it is a compilation of ritual-offering formulas that were said by a priest while an individual performed ritual actions such as those before the yajña fire. Yajurveda is one of the four Vedas, and one of the scriptures of Hinduism. The exact century of the Yajurveda's composition is unknown, and estimated by Witzel to be between 1200 and 800 BCE, contemporaneous with Sāmaveda and Atharvaveda.

The Yajurveda is broadly grouped into two – the "black" or "dark" (Krishna) Yajurveda and the "white" or "bright" (Shukla) Yajurveda. The term "black" implies "the un-arranged, unclear, motley collection" of verses in Yajurveda, in contrast to the "white" which implies the "well arranged, clear" Yajurveda. The black Yajurveda has survived in four recensions, while two recensions of white Yajurveda have survived into modern times.

The earliest and most ancient layer of Yajurveda samhita includes about 1,875 verses, that are distinct yet borrow and build upon the foundation of verses in Rigveda. The middle layer includes the Satapatha Brahmana, one of the largest Brahmana texts in the Vedic collection. The youngest layer of Yajurveda text includes the largest collection of primary Upanishads, influential to various schools of Hindu philosophy. These include the Brihadaranyaka Upanishad, the Isha Upanishad, the Taittiriya Upanishad, the Katha Upanishad, the Shvetashvatara Upanishad and the Maitri Upanishad.

Two of the oldest surviving manuscript copies of the Shukla Yajurveda sections have been discovered in Nepal and Western Tibet, and these are dated to the 12th-century CE.

== Etymology ==
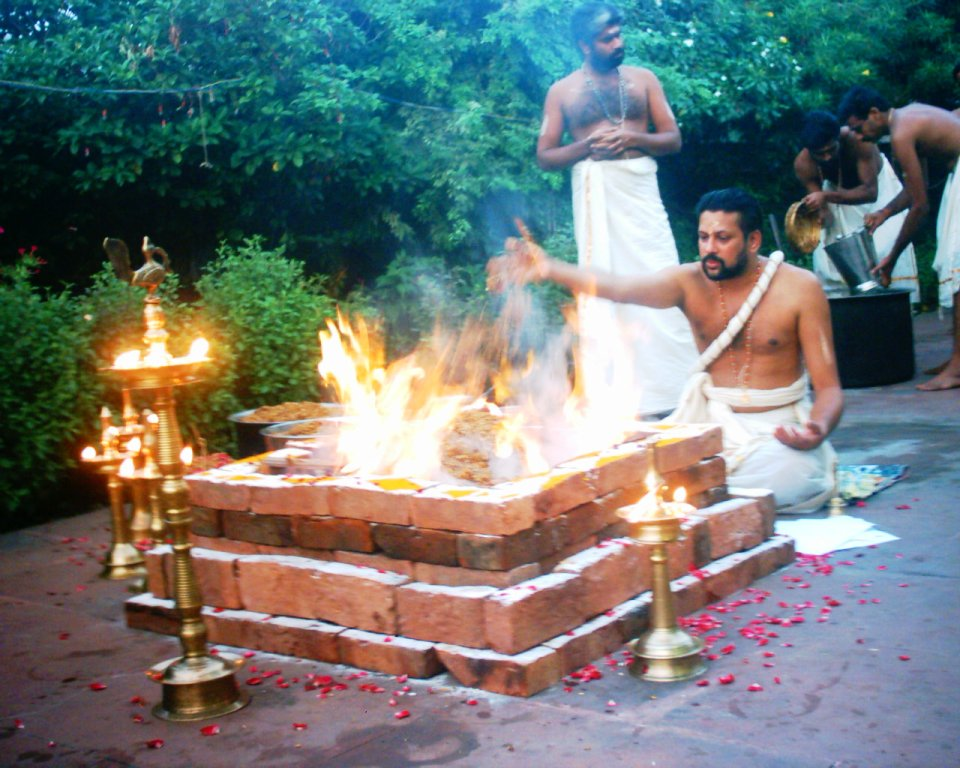
Yajurveda text describes formula and mantras to be uttered during sacrificial fire (yajna) rituals, shown. Offerings are typically ghee (clarified butter), grains, aromatic seeds, and cow milk.

Yajurveda is a compound Sanskrit word, composed of yajus (यजुस्) and Veda (वेद). Monier-Williams translates yajus as "religious reverence, veneration, worship, sacrifice, a sacrificial prayer, formula, particularly mantras uttered in a peculiar manner at a sacrifice". Veda means "knowledge". Johnson states yajus means "(mostly) prose formulae or mantras, contained in the Yajur Veda, which are muttered".

Michael Witzel interprets Yajurveda to mean a "knowledge text of prose mantras" used in Vedic rituals. Ralph Griffith interprets the name to mean "knowledge of sacrifice or sacrificial texts and formulas". Carl Olson states that Yajurveda is a text of "mantras (sacred formulas) that are repeated and used in rituals".

== Dating and historical context ==
The core text of the Yajurveda falls within the classical Mantra period of Vedic Sanskrit at the end of the 2nd millennium BCE – younger than the Rigveda, and roughly contemporary with the Atharvaveda, the Rigvedic Khilani, and the Sāmaveda. The scholarly consensus dates the bulk of the Yajurveda and Atharvaveda hymns to the early Indian Iron Age, after c. 1200 and before 800 BCE.

== Text ==
=== Recensions ===
The Yajurveda text includes the Shukla Yajurveda of which about 16 recensions (known as Shaakhaas) are known, while the Krishna Yajurveda may have had as many as 86 recensions. Only two recensions of the Shukla Yajurveda have survived, Madhyandina and Kanva, and others are known by name only because they are mentioned in other texts. These two recensions are nearly the same, except for a few differences. In contrast to Shukla Yajurveda, the four surviving recensions of Krishna Yajurveda are very different versions.

==== Shukla Yajurveda ====
The samhita in the Shukla Yajurveda is called the Vajasaneyi Samhita. The name Vajasaneyi is derived from Vajasaneya, the patronymic of Yajnavalkya, and the founder of the Vajasaneyi branch. There are two (nearly identical) surviving recensions of the Vajasaneyi Samhita (VS): Vajasaneyi Madhyandina and Vajasaneyi Kanva. The lost recensions of the White Yajurveda, mentioned in other texts of ancient India, include Jabala, Baudhya, Sapeyi, Tapaniya, Kapola, Paundravatsa, Avati, Paramavatika, Parasara, Vaineya, Vaidheya, Katyayana and Vaijyavapa.

Recensions of the White Yajurveda
| Recension Name | Adhyayas | Anuvakas | No. of Verses | Regional presence | Reference |
|---|---|---|---|---|---|
| Madhyandina | 40 | 303 | 1975 | Bihar, Madhya Pradesh, Gujarat, North India | |
| Kanva | 40 | 328 | 2086 | Maharashtra, Odisha, Telangana, Andhra Pradesh, Kerala, Karnataka, Tamil Nadu | |

Shukla Yajurveda Shaakhaas
| Shakha | Samhita | Brahmana | Aranyaka | Upanishad |
|---|---|---|---|---|
| Madhyandina (VSM) | Vajasneyi Samhita (Madhyandin) | Madhyandina Shatapatha (SBM) | survives as Shatapatha XIV.1–8, with accents. | Brihadaranyaka Upanishad |
| Kanva (VSK) | Vajasneyi Samhita (Kanva) | Kanva Shatapatha (SBK) (different from madhyandina) | survives as book XVII of SBK | Brihadaranyaka Upanishad (different from above) |

==== Krishna Yajurveda ====
There are four surviving recensions of the Krishna Yajurveda – Taittirīya saṃhitā, Maitrayani saṃhitā, Kaṭha saṃhitā and Kapiṣṭhala saṃhitā. A total of eighty six recensions are mentioned to exist in Vayu Purana, however vast majority of them are believed to be lost. The Katha school is referred to as a sub-school of Carakas (wanderers) in some ancient texts of India, because they did their scholarship as they wandered from place to place. In contrast to the Shukla Yajurveda, the saṃhitās of the Krishna Yajurveda contained both mantras and explanatory prose (which would usually belong to the brāhmaṇas).

Recensions of the Black Yajurveda
| Recension Name | No. of Sub-recensions | Kanda | Prapathaka | No. of Mantras | Regional presence | Reference |
|---|---|---|---|---|---|---|
| Taittiriya | 2 | 7 | 42 | | South India | |
| Maitrayani | 6 | 4 | 54 | | Western India | |
| Kāṭhaka (Caraka) | 12 | 5 | 40 | 3093 | Kashmir, North India, East India | |
| Kapiṣṭhala | 5 | 6 | 48 | | Extinct | |

Krishna Yajurveda Shaakhaas
| Shakha | Samhita | Brahmana | Aranyaka | Upanishad |
|---|---|---|---|---|
| Taittiriya | Taittiriya Samhita | Taittiriya Brahmana and Vadhula Brahmana (part of Vadhula Srautrasutra) | Taittiriya Aranyaka | Taittiriya Upanishad |
| Maitrayani | Maitrayani Samhita | Within the Samhita | Maitrayaniya Upanishad | |
| Caraka-Katha | Katha Samhita | Śatādhyāya Brāhmaṇa (only exists in fragments) | Katha Aranyaka (almost the entire text from a solitary manuscript) | Kathaka Upanishad, Katha-Shiksha Upanishad |

The most modern recensions is the Taittirīya saṃhitā. Some attribute it to Tittiri, a pupil of Yaska and mentioned by Panini. The text is associated with the Taittiriya school of the Yajurveda, and attributed to the pupils of sage Tittiri (literally, partridge birds).

The Maitrayani saṃhitā is the oldest Yajurveda Samhita that has survived, and it differs largely in content from the Taittiriyas, as well as in some different arrangement of chapters, but is much more detailed.

The Kāṭhaka saṃhitā or the Caraka-Kaṭha saṃhitā, according to tradition was compiled by Katha, a disciple of Vaisampayana. Like the Maitrayani Samhita, it offers much more detailed discussion of some rituals than the younger Taittiriya samhita that frequently summarizes such accounts. The Kapiṣṭhala saṃhitā or the Kapiṣṭhala-Kaṭha saṃhitā, named after the sage Kapisthala is extant only in some large fragments and edited without accent marks. This text is practically a variant of the Kāṭhaka saṃhitā.

=== Organization ===
Each regional edition (recension) of Yajurveda had Samhita, Brahmana, Aranyakas, Upanishads as part of the text, with Shrautasutras, Grhyasutras and Pratishakhya attached to the text. In Shukla Yajurveda, the text organization is same for both Madhayndina and Kanva shakhas. The texts attached to Shukla Yajurveda include the Katyayana Shrautasutra, Paraskara Grhyasutra and Shukla Yajurveda Pratishakhya.

In Krishna Yajurveda, each of the recensions has or had their Brahmana text mixed into the Samhita text, thus creating a motley of the prose and verses, and making it unclear, disorganized.

== Contents ==
=== Samhitas ===
The Vajasaneyi Samhita has forty chapters or adhyayas, containing the formulas used with the following rituals:

Chapters of the White Yajurveda
| Chapter No. | Ritual Name | Time | Nature of Ritual | Reference |
|---|---|---|---|---|
| 1–2 | Darṣapūrṇamāsa (Full and new moon rituals) | 2 days | Offer cow milk to fire. Separate calves from the cows. | |
| 3 | Agnihotra and Cāturmāsya | 1 day, 4 months | The former is the daily oblation of milk into the fire, and the latter is the seasonal sacrifices at the beginning of the three seasons. | |
| 4–8 | Soma sacrifice | | Bathe in river. Offer milk and soma to fire. Offerings to deities of thought, speech. Prayer to Indra to harm no crop, guard the cattle, expel demons. | |
| 9–10 | Vājapeya and Rājasūya | | The former is a variant of the soma sacrifice which involves a chariot race, and the latter is a variant of the soma sacrifice in which a king is consecrated. | |
| 11–18 | Agnicayana | 360 | Formulas and rituals for building altars and hearths for Agni yajna, with largest in the shape of outspread eagle or falcon. | |
| 19–21 | Sautrāmaṇī | | Ritual that deals with the overindulgence of soma, and to assure victory and success. | |
| 22–25 | Aśvamedha | 180 or 360 | Horse sacrifice ritual conducted by kings. | |
| 26–29 | | | Supplementary formulas for above sacrifices | |
| 30–31 | Puruṣamedha | | Symbolic sacrifice of Purusha (Cosmic Man). Nominal victim played the part, but released uninjured after the ceremony, according to Max Muller and others. A substitute for Ashvamedha (horse sacrifice). The ritual plays out the cosmic creation. | |
| 32–34 | Sarvamedha | 10 | Stated to be more important than Purushamedha above. This ritual is a sacrifice for Universal Success and Prosperity. Ritual for one to be wished well, or someone leaving the home, particularly for solitude and moksha, who is offered "curd and ghee (clarified butter)". | |
| 35 | Pitriyajna | | Ritual funeral-related formulas for cremation. Sacrifice to the Fathers and Ancestors. | |
| 36–39 | Pravargya | | According to Griffith, the ritual is for long life, unimpaired faculties, health, strength, prosperity, security, tranquility and contentment. Offerings of cow milk and grains to yajna fire. | |
| 40 | | | This chapter is not an external sacrifice ritual-related. It is Isha Upanishad, which talks about Atma. The verse 40.6 states, "He who sees every being in relation to Paramatma, who sees the Paramatma in every being thereafter does not hate anything. | |

Structure of the mantras

The various ritual mantras in the Yajurveda Samhitas are typically set in a meter, and call on Vedic deities such as the Savita (Sun), Indra, Agni, Prajapati, Rudra and others. The Taittiriya Samhita in Book 4, for example, includes the following verses for the Agnicayana ritual recitation (abridged),

First harnessing the mind, Savita; creating thoughts and perceiving light, brought Agni from the earth.
Harnessing the gods with mind; they who go with thought to the sky, to heaven, Savita instigates those who will make great light.
With the mind harnessed, we are instigated by god Savita, for strength to go to heaven.

Whose journey the other gods follow, praising the power of the god, who measured the radiant regions of the earth, he is the great god Savita.
God Savita, impel the ritual, impel for good fortune the lord of ritual !
Divine Gandharva, purifier of thought, purify our thoughts ! May the lord of speech make our words sweet !

God Savita, impel for us this ritual,
Honoring the gods, gaining friends, always victorious, winning wealth, winning heaven !

— Taittiriya Samhita 4.1.1, Translated by Frits Staal

=== Satapatha Brahmana ===
The title Satapatha Brahmana means "Brahmana of the Hundred Paths". It is one of the largest Brahmana text that has survived. It includes, states Staal, a "veritable encyclopedia of meandering opinions on ritual and other matters".

The Satapatha Brahmana was translated by Eggeling in late 19th-century, reprinted often and has been well read because of the translation. However, it has been misinterpreted and misused, states Staal, because "it contains enough material to support any theory". Eggeling, the first translator of Satapatha Brahmana called it "flimsy symbolism rather than serious reasoning", similar to "speculative vaporings" found in the Christian and non-Christian variety of Gnosticism.

=== Upanishads ===
The Yajurveda has six primary Upanishads embedded within it.

==== Brihadaranyaka Upanishad ====
The Brihadaranyaka Upanishad is found in the White Yajurveda. It is one of the Mukhya Upanishads, and among the largest and oldest as well (~700 BCE). It is a key scripture of Hinduism that has influenced all schools of Hindu philosophy. The text is a treatise on Ātman (Soul, Self), with passages on metaphysics, ethics and a yearning for knowledge that influenced various Indian religions, ancient and medieval scholars.

The Brihadaranyaka Upanishad is among the earliest extensive discussions of the Hindu concept of dharma, karma and moksha (liberation from sorrow, freedom, emancipation, self-realization). Paul Deussen calls it, "unique in its richness and warmth of presentation", with profoundness that retains its full worth in modern times. Max Muller illustrated its style as follows,

But when he [Self] fancies that he is, as it were, a god,
or that he is, as it were, a king,
or "I am this altogether," that is his highest world,
This indeed is his (true) form, free from desires, free from evil, free from fear.

Now as a man, when embraced by a beloved wife,
knows nothing that is without, nothing that is within,
thus this person, when embraced by the Prajna (conscious, aware) Self,
knows nothing that is without, nothing that is within.
This indeed is his (true) form, in which his wishes are fulfilled,
in which the Self only is his wish, in which no other wish is left,
he is free from any sorrow.

— Brihadaranyaka Upanishad, Chapter 4, Brahmanam 3, Hymns 20–32, Translated by Max Muller

==== Isha Upanishad ====
The Isha Upanishad is found in the White Yajurveda. It is one of the shortest Upanishads, embedded as the final chapter of the Shukla Yajurveda. A key scripture of the Vedanta sub-schools of Hinduism, its name is derived from "hidden in the Lord (Self)".

The Isha Upanishad discusses the Atman (Soul, Self) theory of Hinduism, and is referenced by both Dvaita (dualism) and Advaita (non-dualism) sub-schools of Vedanta. It is classified as a "poetic Upanishad" along with Kena, Katha, Shvetashvatara and Mandukya Upanishads.

==== Taittiriya Upanishad ====
The Taittiriya Upanishad is found in the black Yajurveda. It is the seventh, eighth and ninth chapters of Taittiriya Aranyaka, which are also called, respectively, the Siksha Valli, the Ananda Valli and the Bhrigu Valli.

The Taittiriya Upanishad includes verses that are partly prayers and benedictions, partly instruction on phonetics and praxis, partly advice on ethics and morals given to graduating students from ancient Vedic gurukul (schools), partly a treatise on allegory, and partly philosophical instruction.

The text offers a view of education system in ancient India. It also includes sections on ethics and invocation for one's personal development. Max Muller translates the text's tenth anuvaka, for example, as an affirmation of one's Self as a capable, empowered blissful being. The tenth anuvaka asserts, "I am he who shakes the tree. I am glorious like the top of a mountain. I, whose pure light (of knowledge) has risen, am that which is truly immortal, as it resides in the sun. I (Soul, Self) am the treasure, wise, immortal, imperishable. This is the teaching of the Veda, by sage Trisanku."

==== Katha Upanishad ====
The Katha Upanishad is found in the black Yajurveda. The Upanishad is the legendary story of a little boy, Nachiketa – the son of sage Vajasravasa, who meets Yama – the Indian deity of death. Their conversation evolves to a discussion of the nature of man, knowledge, Ātman (Soul, Self) and moksha (liberation).

The Kathaka Upanishad is an important ancient Sanskrit corpus of the Vedanta sub-schools. It asserts that "Atman (Soul, Self) exists", teaches the precept "seek Self-knowledge which is Highest Bliss", and expounds on this premise like the other primary Upanishads of Hinduism. The detailed teachings of Katha Upanishad have been variously interpreted, as Dvaita (dualistic) and as Advaita (non-dualistic).

The Katha Upanishad found in the Yajurveda is among the most widely studied Upanishads. Philosophers such as Arthur Schopenhauer praised it, Edwin Arnold rendered it in verse as "The Secret of Death", and Ralph Waldo Emerson credited Katha Upanishad for the central story at the end of his essay Immortality, as well as his poem "Brahma".

==== Shvetashvatara Upanishad ====
The Shvetashvatara Upanishad is found in the black Yajurveda. The text opens with metaphysical questions about the primal cause of all existence, its origin, its end, and what role if any did time, nature, necessity, chance, the spirit had as primal cause? It then develops its answer, concluding that "the Universal Soul exists in every individual, it expresses itself in every creature, everything in the world is a projection of it, and that there is Oneness, a unity of souls in one and only Self".

The Shvetashvatara Upanishad is notable for its discussion of the concept of personal god – Ishvara, and suggesting it to be a path to one's own Highest Self. The text is also notable for its multiple mentions of both Rudra and Shiva, along with other Vedic deities, and of crystallization of Shiva as a central theme.

==== Maitrayaniya Upanishad ====
The Maitrayaniya Upanishad, also known as the Maitri Upanishad, is found in the black Yajurveda. It consists of seven Prapathakas (lessons). The first Prapathaka is introductory, the next three are structured in a question-answer style and discuss metaphysical questions relating to Atman (Self, Soul), while the fifth to seventh Prapathaka are supplements. However, several manuscripts discovered in different parts of India contain lesser number of Prapathakas, with a Telugu-language version showing just four.

The common kernel of the Maitri Upanishad across different recensions, states Max Muller, is a reverence for soul, that can be summarized in a few words as, "(Man) is the Self – the immortal, the fearless, the Brahman". The Maitrayaniya Upanishad is notable for its references to theories also found in Buddhism, elements of the Samkhya and Yoga schools of Hinduism, as well as the Ashrama system.

=== Srautasutras ===
The Yajurveda had Shrautasutras and Grhyasutras attached to it, from fifteen schools: Apastamba, Agastya, Agniveshyaka, Baudhayana, Bharadvaja, Hiranyakeshi, Kaundinya, Kusidaka, Katyayana, Lokaksita, Madhyamdina, Panca-Kathaka, Satyasadha, Sakala, Sandilya, Vaikhanasa, and Vadula. Of these nine have survived, along with portions of Kaundinya.

== Manuscripts and translations ==
Most surviving manuscripts and recensions of Yajurveda's Samhitas, Aranyakas and Brahmanas remain untranslated into Western languages. The two reliable translations are from British India colonial era, and have been widely studied. These are AB Keith's translation of Taittiriya Samhita of the Black Yajurveda, and Juliu Eggeling's translation of Satapatha Brahmana of the White Yajurveda.

Ralph Griffith published an early translation of White Yajurveda Samhita. However, Frits Staal has questioned his translations and considers them "fantasies and best discarded".

Devi Chand published a re-interpreted translation of Yajurveda in 1965, reprinted as 3rd edition in 1980, wherein the translation incorporated Dayananda Saraswati's monotheistic interpretations of the Vedic text, and the translation liberally adds "O Lord" and "the Creator" to various verses, unlike other translators.

=== Ezourvedam forgery ===
In 18th century, French Jesuits published Ezourvedam, claiming it to be a translation of a recension of the Yajurveda. The Ezourveda was studied by Voltaire, and later declared a forgery, representing Jesuit ideas to Indians as a Vedic school.

== Significance ==
The text is a useful source of information about the agriculture, economic and social life during the Vedic era. The verses, for example, list the types of crops considered important in ancient India,

May my rice plants and my barley, and my beans and my sesame,
and my kidney-beans and my vetches, and my pearl millet and my proso millet,
and my sorghum and my wild rice, and my wheat and my lentils,
prosper by sacrifice.

— White Yajurveda 18.12,

== See also ==
- Hindu philosophy
- Hinduism
- Kalpa (Vedanga)
- Mahīdhara
- Shatapatha Brahmana
- Vedas
- Yajna
- Sandhyavandanam
- Durwakshat Mantra

== Sources ==
- Flood, Gavin (1996), An Introduction to Hinduism, Cambridge University Press, ISBN 978-0-521-43878-0
- Gonda, J. (1975). Vedic literature : (Saṃhitās and Brāhmaṇas). Wiesbaden: Harrassowitz. ISBN 3-447-01603-5.
- Witzel, Michael (1997), "The Development of the Vedic Canon and its Schools: The Social and Political Milieu" (PDF), in Witzel, Michael (ed.), Inside the Texts, Beyond the Texts: New Approaches to the Study of the Vedas, Harvard Oriental Series, Opera Minora; vol. 2, Cambridge: Harvard University Press
- Witzel, Michael (2001), "Autochthonous Aryans? The Evidence from Old Indian and Iranian Texts" (PDF), Electronic Journal of Vedic Studies, 7 (3): 1–115
