= Isha Upanishad =

One of the ancient Sanskrit scriptures of Hinduism

Isha
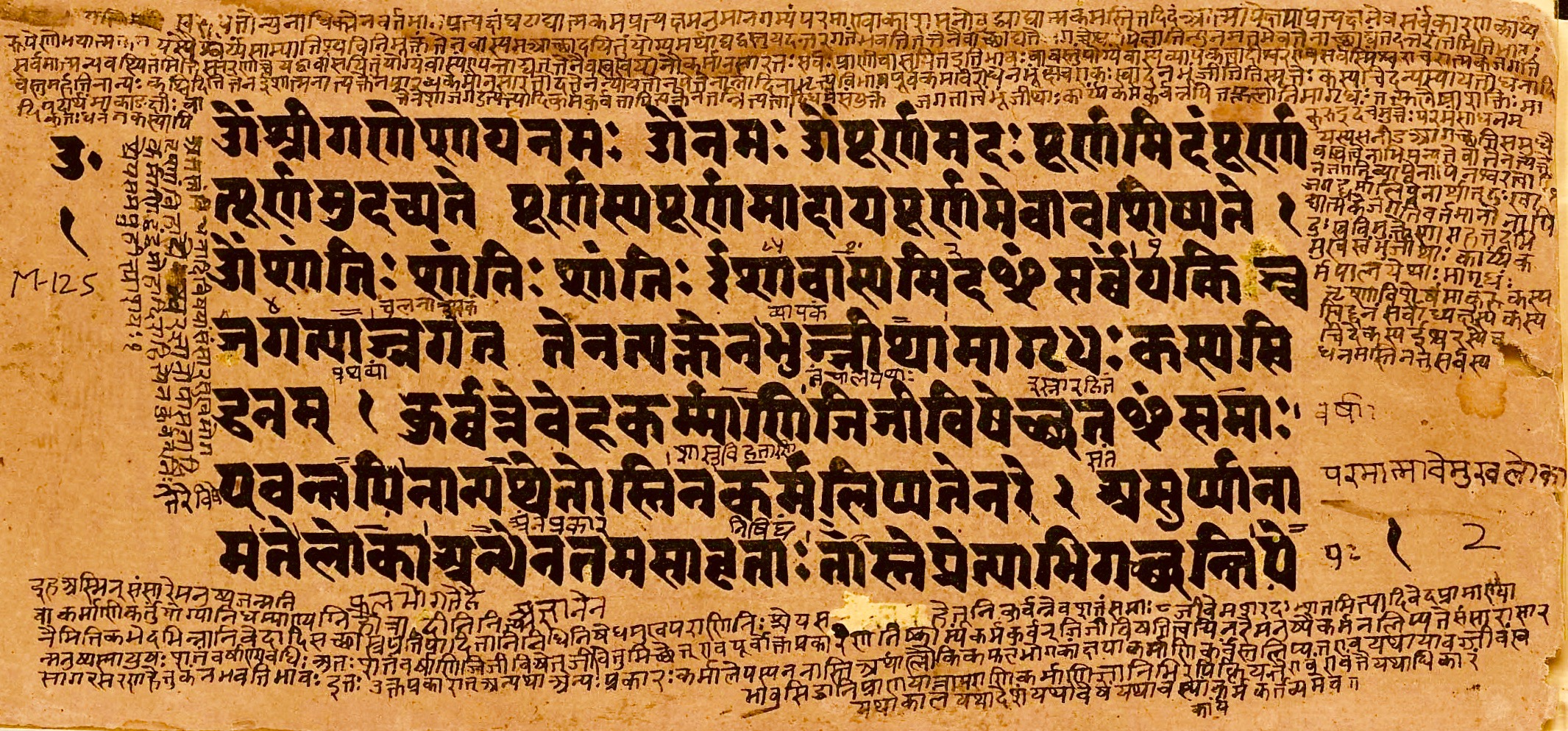
- Isha Upanishad, verses 1 to 3 (Sanskrit, Devanagari script)
- Devanagari: ईश
- IAST: īśā
- Date: 1st millennium BC
- Type: Mukhya Upanishad
- Linked Veda: Shukla Yajurveda
- Verses: 17 or 18
- Commented by: Adi Shankara, Madhvacharya

The Isha Upanishad (Sanskrit: ईशोपनिषद्, IAST: Īśopaniṣad), also known as Shri Ishopanishad, Ishavasya Upanishad, or Vajasaneyi Samhita Upanishad, is one of the shortest Upanishads, embedded as the final chapter (adhyāya) of the Shukla Yajurveda. It is a Mukhya (primary, principal) Upanishad, and is known in two recensions, called Kanva (VSK) and Madhyandina (VSM). The Upanishad is a brief poem, consisting of 17 or 18 verses, depending on the recension.

It is a key scripture of the Vedanta sub-schools, and an influential Śruti to diverse schools of Hinduism. It is the 40th chapter of Yajurveda. The name of the text derives from its incipit, īśā vāsyam, "enveloped by the Lord", or "hidden in the Lord (Self)". The text discusses the Atman (Self) theory of Hinduism, and is referenced by both Dvaita (dualism) and Advaita (non-dualism) sub-schools of Vedanta.

It is classified as a "poetic Upanishad" along with Kena, Katha, Shvetashvatara and Mundaka by Paul Deussen (1908).

== Etymology ==
Isha (ईशा, Īśā) is the instrumental singular form of the noun Īt (ईट्), which is derived from the Sanskrit root Īś (ईश्), meaning "to command", "to rule, reign". The root is traditionally listed in Sanskrit grammatical texts as Īśa aiśvarye (ईशँ ऐश्वर्ये), indicating that its fundamental sense pertains to lordship, mastery, or the power to command. The term vāsyam (वास्यम्), in Ānandagiri's Isha Upanishad commentary, is explicitly glossed as vyāptam (व्याप्तम्), meaning "pervaded by". When compounding these two words, this Upanishad is also known as Ishavasya Upanishad. Thus, this Upanishad can be translated as "pervaded by the God".

The Isha Upanishad is found in the last (40th) chapter of the Shukla Yajurveda, the Vajasaneyi Samhita. Thus, the Isha Upanishad is also referred to as the Vajasaneyi Samhita Upanishad.

== Chronology ==
The chronology of Isha Upanishad, along with other Vedic era literature, is unclear and contested by scholars. All opinions rest on scanty evidence, assumptions about likely evolution of ideas, and on presumptions about which philosophy might have influenced which other Indian philosophies.

Scholars of Buddhism such as Richard King date Isha Upanishad's composition roughly to the second half of the first millennium BCE, chronologically placing it after the first Buddhist Pali canons.

Scholars of Hinduism such as Stephen Phillips note the disagreement between modern scholars. Phillips suggests that Isha Upanishad was likely one of the earliest Upanishads, composed in the 1st half of 1st millennium BCE, after Brihadaranyaka and Chandogya, but before Taittiriya, Aitareya, Kaushitaki, Kena, Katha, Manduka, Prasna, Shvetashvatara and Maitri Upanishads, as well as before the earliest Buddhist Pali and Jaina canons.

Earlier 19th- and 20th-century scholars have similarly expressed a spectrum of views. Isha Upanishad has been chronologically listed by them as being among early Upanishads to being one among the middle Upanishads. Deussen suggested, for example, that Isha was composed after ancient prose Upanishads – Brihadaranyaka, Chandogya, Taittiriya, Aitareya, Kaushitaki and Kena; during a period when metrical poem-like Upanishads were being composed. Further, he suggests that Isha was composed before other prose Upanishads such as Prasna, Maitri, Mandukya and all post-Vedic era Upanishads.

Winternitz, suggests that Isha Upanishad was probably a pre-Buddha composition along with Katha, Shvetashvatara, Mundaka and Prasna Upanishad, but after the first phase of ancient Upanishads that were composed in prose such as Brihadaranyaka, Chandogya, Taittiriya, Aitareya, Kaushitaki and Kena. Winternitz states that Isha was likely composed before post-Buddhist Upanishads such as Maitri and Mandukya.

Ranade posits that Isha was composed in the second group of Upanishads along with Kena Upanishad, right after the first group of Brihadaranyaka and Chandogya, but chronologically before Taittiriya, Aitareya, Kaushitaki, Katha, Mundaka, Shvetashvatara, Prasna, Mandukya and Maitrayani.

== Structure ==
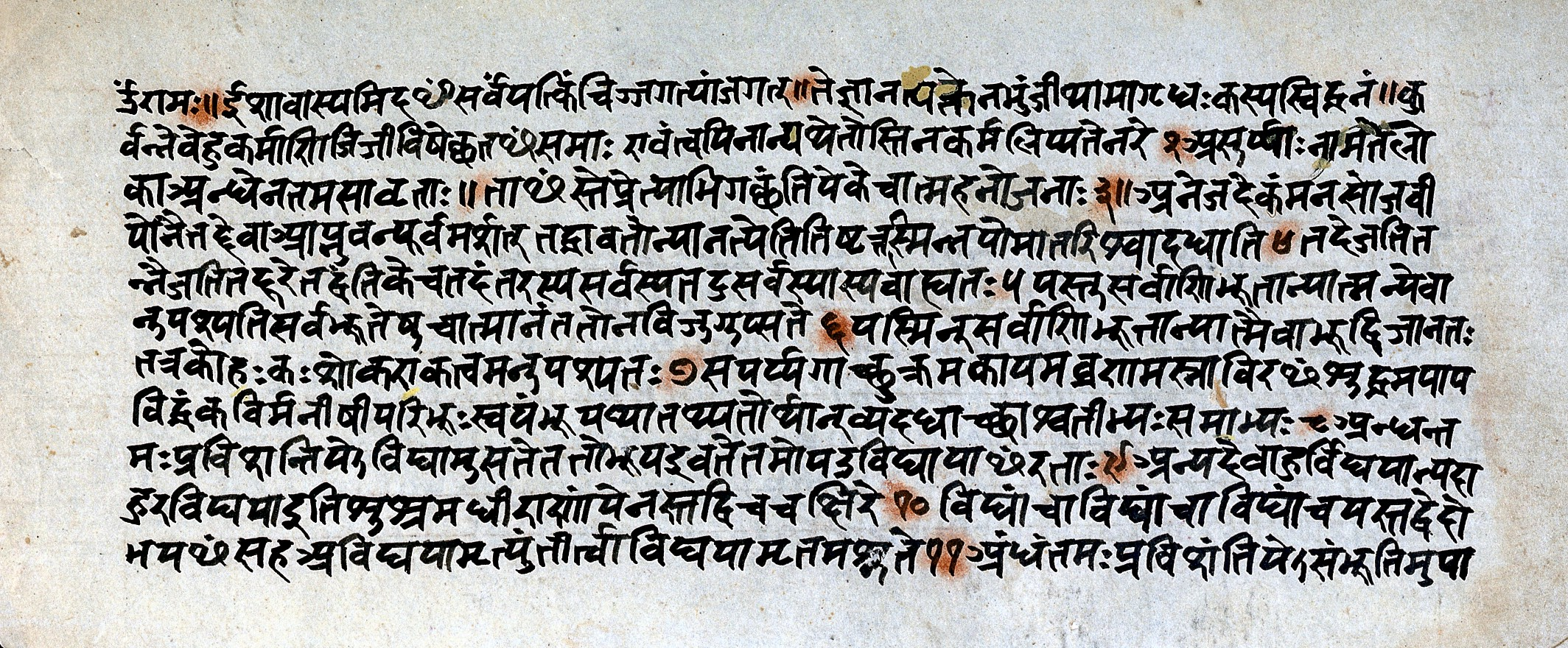
A manuscript page from the Isha Upanisad.

Isha Upanishad is the only Upanishad that is attached to a Samhita, the most ancient layer of Vedic text known for their mantras and benedictions. Other Upanishads are attached to a later layer of Vedic texts such as Brahmanas and Aranyakas. Max Muller notes that this does not necessarily mean that Isha Upanishad is among the oldest, because Shukla Yajurveda is acknowledged to be of a later origin than textual layers of other Vedas such as the Rig Veda.

The 8th-century Indian scholar Adi Shankara, in his Bhasya (review and commentary) noted that the mantras and hymns of Isha Upanishad are not used in rituals, because their purpose is to enlighten the reader as to "what is the nature of Self (Atman)?"; the Upanishad, thus, despite Yajurveda Samhita's liturgical focus, has not historically served as a liturgical text. Isha Upanishad is a philosophical text.

=== Difference between recensions ===
The Isha Upanishad manuscript differs in the two shakhas of the Shukla Yajurveda. These are called the Kanva (VSK) and Madhyandina (VSM) recensions. The order of verses 1–8 is the same in both, however, Kanva verses 9–14 correspond to Madhyandina verses 12, 13, 14, 9, 10, 11. Madhyandina verse 17 is a variation of Kanva 15, Verse 16 of the Kanva recension is absent in the Madhyandina, while verses 17 - 18 of the Kanva correspond to verses 15-16 of the Madhyandina.

In both recensions, the Isha Upanishad is the 40th chapter of Shukla Yajur Veda. Versions with 18 verses refer to Kanva, while those with 17 verses are referring to the Madhyandina.

Kanva 40	1	2	3	4	5	6	7	8	9	10	11	12	13	14	15	16	17	18
Madhyandina 40	1	2	3	4	5	6	7	8	12	13	14	9	10	11	(17)	–	15	16

== Content ==
=== Monism versus theism ===
The Isha Upanishad is significant for its singular mention of the term "Isha" in the first hymn, a term it never repeats in other hymns. The concept "Isha" exhibits monism in one interpretation, or a form of monotheism in an alternative interpretation, referred to as "Self" or "Deity Lord" respectively.

Enveloped by the Lord must be This All — each thing that moves on earth.

With that renounced, enjoy thyself. Covet no wealth of any man.

— Isha Upanishad, Hymn 1

Ralph Griffith interprets the word "Isha" contextually, translates it as "the Lord", and clarifies that this "the Lord" means "the Self of All, and thy inmost Self – the only Absolute Reality". The term "This All" is the empirical reality, while the term "renounced" is referring the Indian concept of sannyasa, and "enjoy thyself" is referring to the "blissful delight of Self-realization".

The Advaita Vedanta scholar Shankara interprets the above hymn 1 as equating "the Lord" as the "Atman" (Self). In contrast, Madhvacharya, the Dvaita Vedanta scholar interprets the hymn as equating "the Lord" as Vishnu, or a monotheistic God in a henotheistic sense. Other interpretations have also been suggested. For example, the more recent scholar Mahīdhara suggested that hymn 1 may be referring to Buddha, an interpretation that Max Muller stated was inadmissible because of the fundamental difference between Hinduism and Buddhism, with Hinduism relying on the premise "Self, Self exists" and Buddhism relying on the premise "Soul, Self does not exist".

=== Pursuit of Karma versus pursuit of Self ===
The Isha Upanishad, in hymns 2–6, acknowledges the contrasting tension within Hinduism, between the empirical life of householder and action (karma) and the spiritual life of renunciation and knowledge (jnana).

Should one wish to live a hundred years on this earth, he should live doing Karma. While thus, as man, you live, there is no way other than this by which Karma will not cling to you. Those who partake the nature of the Asuras [evil], are enveloped in blind darkness, and that is where they reside who ignore their Atman [Self]. For liberation, know your Atman, which is motionless yet faster than mind, it is distant, it is near, it is within all, it is without all this. It is all pervading. And he who beholds all beings in the Self, and the Self in all beings, he never turns away from it [the Self].

— Isha Upanishad, Hymns 2-6

Adi Shankara suggests that "he" in hymn 6 (last sentence in above quote) is the "seeker of emancipation, on a journey to realize Self and Oneness in innermost self and everyone, and includes those in sannyasa"; while Madhvacharya suggests "he" is "the individual Self in loving devotion of God, seeking to get infinitely close to the God Self".

Max Muller, in his review of commentaries by many ancient and medieval Indian scholars, states that these verses of Isha Upanishad are proclaiming the "uselessness of all rituals, whether related to sacrifices or precepts of dharma", but simultaneously acknowledging the "harmlessness and necessity of social activity, that may be seen as potentially intermediate preparation to the path of Knowledge". The Isha Upanishad, is reminding the reader that neither routine life and rituals are right nor are they wrong, states Max Muller. They may be necessary to many, nevertheless, to prepare a person for emancipation, to show the path where cravings feel meaningless, and to produce a serene mind that longs for meaning and one that can discern highest knowledge. Ralph Griffith suggests the verses 2–6 of Isha Upanishad are condemning those who perform Karma in order to "get future advantages in life or to gain a place in heaven", because that is ignorance. The avoidance of "Self knowledge and its eternal, all-pervasive nature" is akin to "killing one's Self" and living a dead life states Isha Upanishad, states Griffith. The pursuit of Self is the seeking of the eternal, the whole, the all-transcending, the self-depending, the Oneness and law of all nature and existence.

=== Vidya versus Avidya ===
The Isha Upanishad suggests that one root of sorrow and suffering is considering one's Self as distinct and conflicted with the Self of others, assuming that the nature of existence is a conflicted duality where one's happiness and suffering is viewed as different from another living being's happiness and suffering. Such sorrow and suffering cannot exist, suggests the Upanishad, if an individual realizes that the Self is in all things, understands the Oneness in all of existence, focuses beyond individual egos and in the pursuit of Universal values, the Self and Real Knowledge.

When to a man who understands,

the Self has become all things,
what sorrow, what trouble can there be,
to him who beholds that unity.

— Isha Upanishad, Hymn 7

The Isha Upanishad, in hymn 8 through 11, praises the study of Vidya (Real Knowledge, eternal truths) and Avidya (not Real Knowledge, empirical truths). It asserts that to he who knows both Vidya and Avidya, the Avidya empowers him to overcome death (makes one alive), while Vidya empowers him with immortality. The Real Knowledge delivers one to freedom, liberation from all sorrows and fears, to a blissful state of life. Mukherjee states that Isha Upanishad in verse 11 is recommending that one must pursue material knowledge and spiritual wisdom simultaneously, and that a fulfilling life results from the harmonious, balanced alignment of the individual and the social interests, the personal and the organizational goals, the material and the spiritual pursuits of life.

The hymns 12 through 14 of Isha Upanishad, caution against the pursuit of only manifested cause or only spiritual cause of anything, stating that one sided pursuits lead to darkness. To be enlightened, seek both (उभयं सह, ubhayam saha), suggests the Upanishad. It asserts that he who knows both the Real and the Perishable, both the manifested not-True cause and the hidden True cause, is the one who is liberated unto immortality.

=== Virtue versus vice ===
In final hymns 15 through 18, the Upanishad asserts a longing for Knowledge, asserting that it is hidden behind the golden disc of light, but a light that one seeks. It reminds one's own mind to remember one's deeds, and accept its consequences. The Madhyandina recension and Kanva recension vary in relative sequencing of the hymns, but both assert the introspective precept, "O Agni (fire) and mind, lead me towards a life of virtues, guide me away from a life of vices", and thus unto the good path and the enjoyment of wealth (of both karma's honey and Self-realization). The final hymns of Isha Upanishad also declare the foundational premise, "I am He", equating one Self's oneness with cosmic Self.

पुरुषः सोऽहमस्मि

I am He, the Purusha within thee.

— Isha Upanishad, Hymn 16 Abridged

== Reception ==
Mahatma Gandhi thought so highly of it that he remarked, "If all the Upanishads and all the other scriptures happened all of a sudden to be reduced to ashes, and if only the first verse in the Ishopanishad were left in the memory of the Hindus, Hinduism would live for ever."

Paul Deussen states that the first verses are notable for including ethics of one who knows the Ātman.

Swami Chinmayananda in his commentary states "The very first stanza of this matchless Upanishad is in itself a miniature philosophical textbook. Besides being comprehensive in its enunciation of Truth, it provides a vivid exposition of the technique of realising the Truth in a language unparalleled in philosophical beauty and literary perfection. Its mantras are the briefest exposition on philosophy and each one is an exercise in contemplation." Swami Chinmayananda notes in his commentary that the 18 verses (VSK recension) proceed over 7 "waves of thought" with the first 3 representing 3 distinct paths of life, 4–8 pointing out the Vision of Truth, 9–14 revealing the path of worship leading to purification, 15–17 revealing the call of the Rishis for man to awaken to his own Immortal state, and verse 18 the prayer to the Lord to bless all seekers with strength to live up to the teachings of the Upanishad.

== See also ==
- Brahma Sutras
- Bhagavad Gita
- Mahabharata
- Bhagavata Purana
- Kena Upanishad
