= Shvetashvatara Upanishad =

One of the ancient Sanskrit scriptures of Hinduism

Shvetashvatara
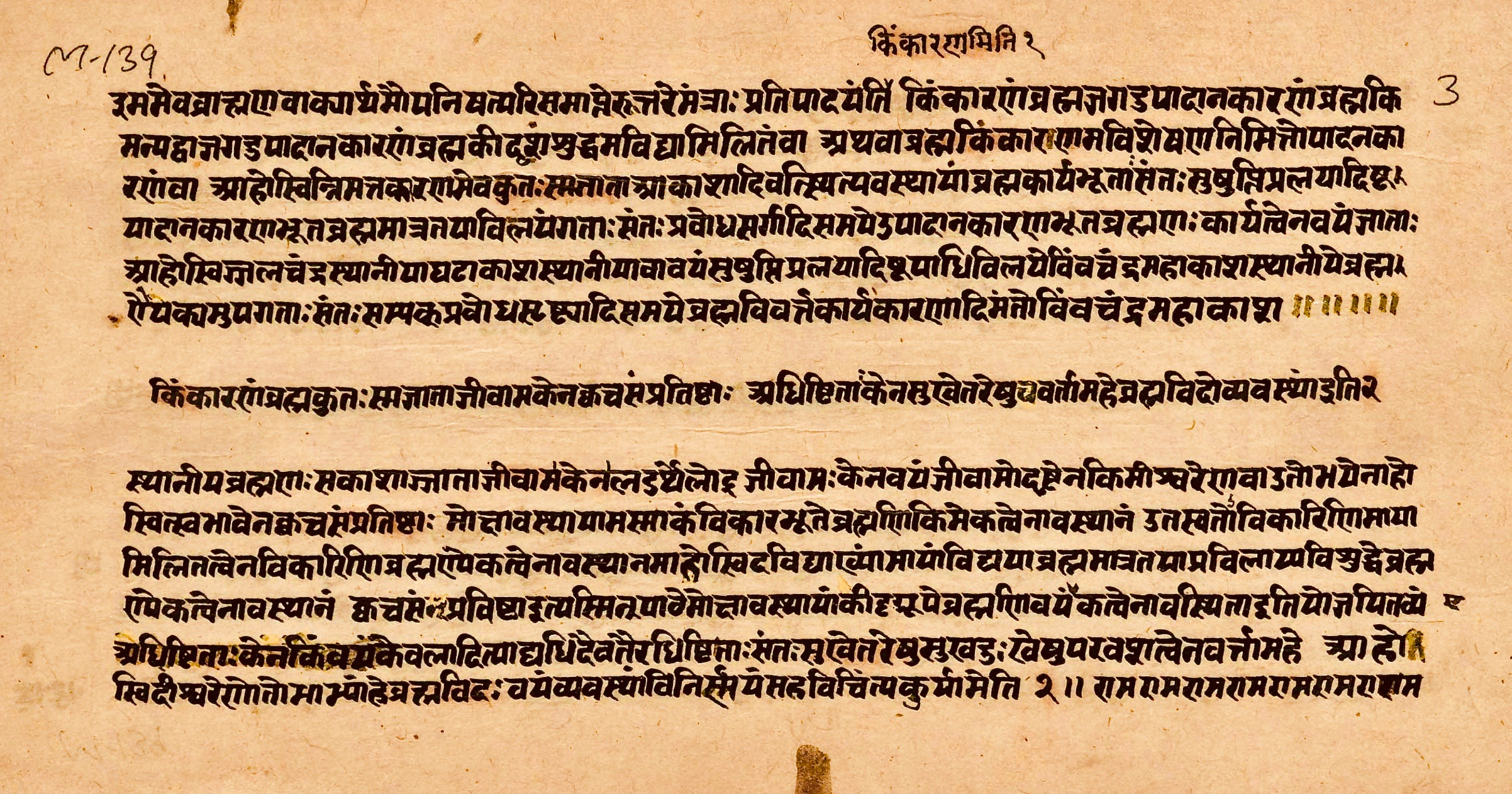
- Shvetashvatara Upanishad verse 1.1 (Sanskrit, Devanagari script)
- Devanagari: श्वेताश्वतर
- IAST: Śvetāśvatara
- Type: Mukhya Upanishad
- Linked Veda: Yajurveda
- Commented by: Adi Shankara, Madhvacharya

The Shvetashvatara Upanishad (Sanskrit: श्वेताश्वतरोपनिषद्, IAST: Śvetāśvataropaniṣad) is an ancient Sanskrit text embedded in the Yajurveda. It is listed as number 14 in the Muktika canon of 108 Upanishads. The Upanishad contains 113 mantras or verses in six chapters.

The Upanishad is one of the 33 Upanishads from Taittiriyas, and associated with the Shvetashvatara tradition within Karakas sakha of the Yajurveda. It is a part of the "black" "krishna" Yajurveda, with the term "black" implying "the un-arranged, motley collection" of content in Yajurveda, in contrast to the "white" (well arranged) Yajurveda where Brihadaranyaka Upanishad and Isha Upanishad are embedded.

The chronology of Shvetashvatara Upanishad is contested, but it is generally accepted to be a late-period Upanishadic composition. The text includes a closing credit to sage Shvetashvatara, who is considered the author of the Upanishad. However, scholars believe that while sections of the text shows an individual stamp by its style, verses and other sections were interpolated and expanded over time; the Upanishad as it exists now is the work of more than one author.

The Shvetashvatara Upanishad opens with metaphysical questions about the primal cause of all existence, its origin, its end, and what role, if any, time, nature, necessity, chance, and the spirit had as the primal cause. It then develops its answer, concluding that "the Universal Selfs exists in every individual, it expresses itself in every creature, everything in the world is a projection of it, and that there is Oneness, a unity of Selfs in one and only Self". The text is notable for its discussion of the concept of personal god – Ishvara, and suggesting it to be a path to one's own Highest Self. The text is also notable for its multiple mentions of both Rudra and Shiva, along with other Vedic deities, and of crystallization of Shiva as a central theme.

The Shvetashvatara Upanishad is commented by many of its ancient and medieval scholars. It is a foundational text of the philosophy of Shaivism, as well as the Yoga and Vedanta schools of Hinduism. Some 19th century scholars initially suggested that Shvetashvatara Upanishad is sectarian or possibly influenced by Christianity, hypotheses that were disputed, later discarded by scholars.

== Etymology ==
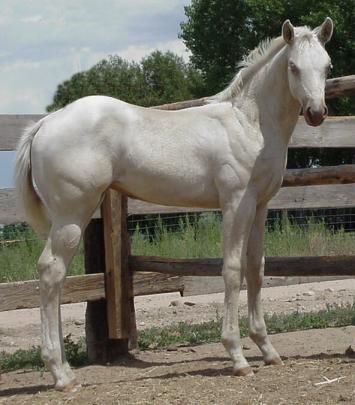
Shvetashvatara means "carried on a white horse"

The name "Shvetashvatara" has the compound Sanskrit root Shvetashva (श्वेताश्व, Shvet + ashva), which literally means "white horse" and "drawn by white steeds". Shvetashvatara is a bahuvrihi compound of (Śvetaśva + tara), where tara means "crossing", "carrying beyond". The word Shvetashvatara translates to "the one carrying beyond on white horse" or simply "white mule that carries".

The text is sometimes spelled as Svetasvatara Upanishad. It is also known as Shvetashvataropanishad or Svetasvataropanishad, and as Shvetashvataranam Mantropanishad.

In ancient and medieval literature, the text is frequently referred to in the plural, that is as Svetasvataropanishadah. In the Vachaspatyam, quoting a shloka from Muktikopanishad, this Upanishad is referred to as simply Shvetashva, in order to fit poetic metres.

== Chronology ==
The chronology of Shvetashvatara Upanishad, like other Upanishads, is uncertain and contested. The chronology is difficult to resolve because all opinions rest on scanty evidence, an analysis of archaism, style and repetitions across texts, driven by assumptions about likely evolution of ideas, and on presumptions about which philosophy might have influenced which other Indian philosophies.

Ranade places Shvetashvatara Upanishad's chronological composition in the fourth group of ancient Upanishads, after Katha and Mundaka Upanishads. Deussen states that Shvetashvatara Upanishad refers to and incorporates phrases from the Katha Upanishad, and chronologically followed it.

According to Patrick Olivelle, it was composed after the Brihadaranyaka, Chandogya, Kena and Katha, probably in the last few centuries BCE, showing non-Vedic influences.

Flood as well as Gorski state that the Shvetashvatara Upanishad was probably composed in the 5th to 4th century BCE, contemporary with the Buddha. Paul Muller-Ortega dates the text between 6th to 5th century BCE. Phillips chronologically lists Shvetashvatara Upanishad after Mandukya Upanishad, but before and about the time the Maitri Upanishad, the first Buddhist Pali and Jaina canonical texts were composed.

Winternitz, suggests that Shvetashvatara Upanishad was probably a pre-Buddhistic composition along with Katha, Isha, Mundaka and Prasna Upanishad, but after the first phase of ancient Upanishads that were composed in prose such as Brihadaranyaka, Chandogya, Taittiriya, Aitareya, Kaushitaki and Kena. Winternitz states that Isha was likely composed before post-Buddhist Upanishads such as Maitri and Mandukya.

Some sections of the Shvetashvatara Upanishad are found, almost in its entirety, in chronologically more ancient Sanskrit texts, as attempts to support its doctrines "with Vedic-proof texts." For example, verses 2.1 through 2.3 are also found in chapter 4.1.1 of Taittiriya Samhita as well as in chapter 6.3.1 of Shatapatha Brahmana, while verses 2.4 and 2.5 are also found as hymns in chapters 5.81 and 10.13 of Rig Veda respectively. Similarly, many verses in chapters 3 through 6 are also found, in nearly identical form in the Samhitas of Rig Veda, Atharva Veda and Yajur Veda.

== Structure ==
The text has six Adhyaya (chapters), each with varying number of verses. The first chapter includes 16 verses, the second has 17, the third chapter contains 21 verses, the fourth is composed of 22, the fifth has 14, while the sixth chapter has 23 verses. The last three verses of the sixth chapter are considered as epilogue. Thus, the Upanishad has 110 main verses and 3 epilogue verses.

The epilogue verse 6.21 is a homage to sage Shvetashvatara for proclaiming Brahman-knowledge to ascetics. This closing credit is structurally notable because of its rarity in ancient Indian texts, as well as for its implication that the four-stage Ashrama system of Hinduism, with ascetic Sannyasa, was an established tradition by the time verse 6.21 of Shvetashvatara Upanishad was composed.

=== Poetic style ===
The Shvetashvatara Upanishad has a poetic style and structure. However, unlike other ancient poetic Upanishads, the meter structure of the Shvetashvatara Upanishad varies significantly, is arbitrary and inconsistent within many verses in later chapters, some such as verse 2.17 lack a definite poetic meter entirely, suggesting that the text congealed from the work of several authors over a period of time, or was interpolated and expanded over time. The first chapter is the consistent one, with characteristics that makes it likely to be the work of one author, probably sage Shvetashvatara.

== Contents ==
The Shvetashvatara Upanishad opens with the metaphysical questions about first causes. Scholars have differed somewhat in their translations, with Max Muller translating the questions thus,

The Brahma-students say: Is Brahman the cause? Whence are we born?
Whereby do we live, and whither do we go?
O ye who know Brahman, tell us at whose command we abide, whether in pain or in pleasure.

Should time, or nature, or necessity, or chance,
or the elements be considered as the cause, or he who is called the Purusha?
It cannot be their union either, because that is not self-dependent, and the self also is powerless,
because there is, independent of him, a cause of good and evil.

— Shvetashvatara Upanishad 1.1-1.2, Translated by Max Muller

Paul Deussen translates the opening metaphysical questions of the Upanishad thus,

The teachers of Brahman say: What is the primal cause? What is Brahman?
Wherefrom have we been born? By what do we subsist? and on what are we founded?
By whom regulated, do we have our being, ye wise men? in the changing conditions of joy and sorrow?

Are Time, Nature, Necessity, Chance, Basic matter, the Spirit, the primal cause?
Can the union of these be thought of as the primal cause?
It is not that, however, because the Self exists.
Still the Self also is not powerful enough to create joy and sorrow!

— Shvetashvatara Upanishad 1.1-1.2, Translated by Paul Deussen

=== The primal cause is within each individual, a power innate – First Adhyāya ===
The Upanishad asserts, in verse 1.3, there are individuals who by meditation and yoga have realized their innate power of Self, powers that were veiled by their own gunas (innate personality, psychological attributes). Therefore, it is this "power of the Divine Self" (Deva Atman Shakti, देवात्मशक्तिं) within each individual that presides over all the primal causes, including time and self.

=== God, non-God, the Eternal is within self – First Adhyāya ===
Verses 1.4 through 1.12 of the Upanishad use Samkhya-style enumeration to state the subject of meditation, for those who seek the knowledge of Self. These verses use a poetic simile for a human being, with the unawakened individual Self described as a resting swan.

The verse 1.5, for example, states, "we meditate on the river whose water consists of five streams, which is wild and winding with its five springs, whose waves are the five vital breaths, whose fountainhead is the mind, of course of the five kinds of perceptions. It has five whirlpools, its rapids are the five pains, it has fifty kinds of sufferings, and five branches." Adi Shankara and other scholars have explained, using more ancient Indian texts, what each of these numbers correspond to. For example, the five streams are five receptive organs of a human body, the five waves are the five active organs of a human body, and five rapids are the major health-related life stages.

The subject of meditation, states Shvetashvatara Upanishad, is the knower and the non-knower, the God and non-God, both of which are eternal. The text distinguishes the highest Self from the individual Self, calling the former Isha and Ishvara, and asserting it is this Highest Brahman which is Eternal and where there is the triad - the bhoktri (subject), the bhogya (object), and the preritri (mover). With meditation, when a being fully realizes and possesses this triad within self, he knows Brahman. In verse 1.10, the text states the world is composed of the Pradhana which is perishable, and Hara the God that is the imperishable. By meditating on Hara and thus becoming one with God Hara, is the path to moksha (liberation). From meditating on it, states verse 1.11, man journeys unto the third state of existence, first that of blissful universal lordship, then further on to "perfect freedom, the divine alone-ness, the kevalatvam where the individual self is one with the divine self."

=== Self knowledge, self discipline and Atman as the final goal of Upanishad – First Adhyāya ===
The Shvetashvatara Upanishad, in verses 1.13 to 1.16, states that to know God, look within, know your Atman (Self). It suggests meditating with the help of syllable Om, where one's perishable body is like one fuel-stick and the syllable Om is the second fuel-stick, which with discipline and diligent churning of the sticks unleashes the concealed fire of thought and awareness within. Such knowledge and ethics is, asserts the Upanishad, the goal of Upanishad.

तिलेषु तैलं दधिनीव सर्पिरापः स्तस्वरणीषु चाग्निः ।
एवमात्माऽत्मनि गृह्यतेऽसौ सत्येनैनं तपसा योऽनुपश्यति ॥ १५ ॥
सर्वव्यापिनमात्मानं क्षीरे सर्पिरिवार्पितम् ।
आत्मविद्यातपोमूलं तद्ब्रह्मोपनिषत्परं तद्ब्रह्मॊपनिषत्परमिति ॥ १६ ॥

As oil in sesame seeds, as butter in milk, as water in Srota, as fire in fuel-sticks,
he finds in his own self that One (Atman), he, who sees him through Satya (truthfulness) and Tapas (austerity). (15)
He sees the all prevading Atman, as butter lying dormant in milk,
rooted in self-knowledge and self-discipline – which is the final goal of the Upanishad, the final goal of Upanishad. (16)

— Shvetashvatara Upanishad 1.15-1.16

=== Yoga as means for self knowledge, self discipline – Second Adhyāya ===
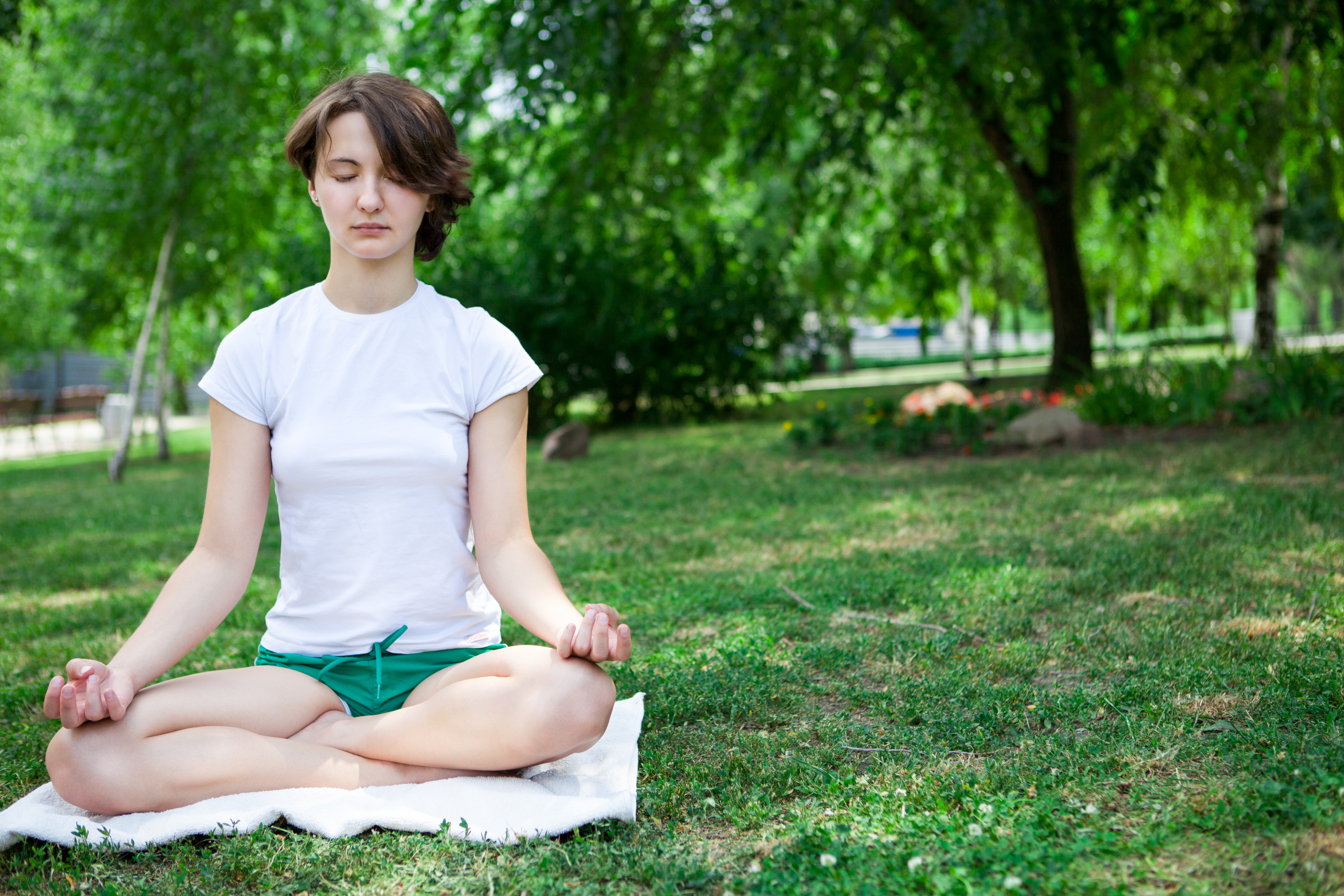
Yoga meditation under shady trees and silent surroundings is recommended in Shvetashvatara Upanishad.

The second Adhyaya of Shvetashvatara Upanishad is a motley collection of themes. It begins with prayer hymns to God Savitr, as the rising sun, the spiritual illuminator and the deity of inspiration and self-discipline. Thereafter, the Upanishad discusses Yoga as a means for self-knowledge.

The verses 2.8 and 2.9 describes yoga as state of body and mind, wherein the body is in threefold erect posture, and mind along with all senses are withdrawn into an introspective point within (the heart). In this state of yoga, the individual then breathes gently slowly through the nose, states the Upanishad, with any physical motions subdued or the body is still, the mind calm and undistracted. Such is the state where the self-reflective meditation starts. The text recommends a place to perform such yoga exercise as follows,

In a clean level spot, free from pebbles, fire and gravel,
Delightful by its sounds, its water and bowers,
Favorable to thought, not offensive to the eye,
In a hidden retreat protected from the wind,
One should practise Yoga.

— Shvetashvatara Upanishad 2.10

The Upanishad, in verse 2.13, describes the first benefits of Yoga to be agility, better health, clear face, sweetness of voice, sweet odor, regular body functions, steadiness, and feeling of lightness in one's personality. Yoga then leads to the knowledge of the essence of the Self, the nature of the Self.

=== Atman as personal God (Isha or Rudra) – Third Adhyāya ===
Verses 3.1 through 3.6 of the Shvetashvatara Upanishad describe the "Atman, Self" as the personal God, as the one and only Lord, that resides within, the origin of all gods, calling it the Isha or Rudra. This innermost Self, is stated as under the sway of Māyā or empirical Prakrti. This theme of Eka Deva (one God) – eternal, all prevading and forging the world with his heat – in Svetasvatara Upanishad, is common in more ancient Sanskrit texts such as Rig Veda's hymns 10.72.2 and 10.81.3, Taittiriya Samhita 4.6.2.4, Taittiriya Aranyaka 10.1.3, White Yajur Veda's Vajasaneyi Samhita 17.19, Atharva Veda 13.2.26 and others.

Similarly, the verses 3.5 and 3.6 are also found in the more ancient Vajasaneyi Samhita as verses 16.2 and 16.3, in Taittiriya Samhita 4.5.1.1, as well as in chapter 8.5 of the chronologically much later Nilarudra Upanishad. These verses symbolically ask Rudra to be graceful and "not hurt any man or any beast".

The verses 3.7 through 3.21 of the Upanishad describes Brahman as the highest, the subtlest and the greatest, concealed in all beings, one that encompasses all of the universe, formless, without sorrow, changeless, all prevading, kind (Shiva), one who applies the power of knowledge, the Purusha, one with the whole world as it is, one with the whole world as it has been, one with the whole world as it will be. It is the Atman, the Self of all.

=== Brahman as the individual and the highest Self – Fourth Adhyāya ===
The Shvetashvatara Upanishad, in verses 4.1 through 4.8 states that everything is Brahman, in everything is Deva (God), it is the individual Self and the highest Self. As in other chapters of the Upanishad, several of these verses are also found in more ancient texts; for example, verse 4.3 of the Shvetashvatara Upanishad is identical to hymn 10.8.27 of Atharva Veda. The verses are notable for their grammar, where through numerous poetic phrases, the gender of the highest Self (God), is meticulously and metrically stated as neuter gender, as against the occasional masculine gender that is found in some ancient texts.

The Upanishad states that Brahman is in all Vedic deities, in all women, in all men, in all boys, in all girls, in every old man tottering on a stick, in every bee and bird, in all seasons and all seas. Out of the highest Self, comes the hymns, the Vedic teachings, the past and the future, asserts the Shvetashvatara Upanishad.

The fourth chapter of the Shvetashvatara Upanishad contains the famous metaphorical verse 4.5, that was oft-cited and debated by the scholars of dualistic Samkhya, monist Vedanta and theistic Vedanta schools of Hinduism in ancient and medieval era, for example in Vedanta Sutra's section 1.4.8. The metaphor-filled verse is as follows,

There is one unborn being (feminine), red, white and black,
but producing many creatures like herself,
There is one unborn being (masculine) who loves her and stays with her,
there is another unborn being (masculine) who leaves her after loving her.

— Shvetashvatara Upanishad 4.5

The metaphor of three colors has been interpreted as the three Gunas, with red symbolizing harmonious purity (Sattva), white as confused passion (Rajas), and black as destructive darkness (Tamas). An alternative interpretation of the three colors is based on an equivalent phrase in chapter 6.2 of Chandogya Upanishad, where the three colors are interpreted to be "fire, water and food". The unborn being with feminine gender is symbolically the Prakrti (nature, matter), while the two masculine beings are Cosmic Self and the Individual Self, the former experiencing delight and staying with Prakrti always, the latter leaves after experiencing the delight of Prakrti. All three are stated in the verse to be "unborn", implying that all three are eternal. The Samkhya school of Hinduism cites this verse for Vedic support of their dualistic doctrine. The Vedanta school, in contrast, cites the same verse but points to the context of the chapter which has already declared that everything, including the feminine (Prakrti) and masculine (Purusha), the individual Self and the cosmic Self, is nothing but Oneness and of a single Brahman.

The verses 4.9 and 4.10 of Shvetashvatara Upanishad state the Māyā doctrine found in many schools of Hinduism. The text asserts that the Prakrti (empirical nature) is Māyā, that the individual Self is caught up by this Māyā (magic, art, creative power), and that the cosmic Self is the Māyin (magician). These verses are notable because these verses are one of the oldest known explicit statement of the Māyā doctrine. The verse 4.10 is also significant because it uses the term Maheswaram (Sanskrit: महेश्वरम्), literally the highest Lord (later epithet for Shiva), for the one who is "Māyā-maker". There is scholarly disagreement on what the term Māyā means in Upanishads, particularly verse 4.10 of the Shvetashvatara Upanishad; Dominic Goodall, for example, states that the term generally meant "supernatural power", not "illusion, magic", in the Upanishads, and Māyā contextually means "primal matter" in verse 4.10 of Shvetashvatara.

=== Rudra and Shiva – Fourth Adhyāya ===
The Upanishad includes a variegated addition of verses 4.11 through 4.22, wherein it repeats – with slight modifications – a flood of ancient Vedic Samhita benedictions and older Upanishadic hymns. In these verses, the Brahman, discussed so far in earlier chapters of the Shvetashvatara Upanishad, is celebrated as Isha, Ishana (personal god) and Rudra. The verses of the fourth chapter use an adjective repeatedly, namely Shiva (literally, kind, benign, blessed) as a designation for Rudra (a fierce, destructive, slaying Vedic deity). This adjective developed into a noun, and the Shvetashvatara Upanishad witnesses the assimilation of the non-Aryan deity Shiva, a central God in later scriptures of Hinduism, into the Vedic fold. The abridged verses are,

(...) । विश्वस्यैकं परिवेष्टितारं ज्ञात्वा शिवं शान्तिमत्यन्तमेति ॥ १४ ॥
घृतात्परं मण्डमिवातिसूक्ष्मं ज्ञात्वा शिवं सर्वभूतेषु गूढम् । (...) ॥ १६ ॥

(...), the one embracer of the universe, by knowing Him as "kind, benign" (śivam), one attains peace forever. (14)
By knowing as "kind, benign" (śivam) Him, who is hidden in all things, like subtle cream inside fine butter, (...)

— Shvetashvatara Upanishad 4.14, 4.16

The benedictions in the fourth chapter of the Shvetashvatara Upanishad praise Rudra, as He who is the origin of gods and one from which gods arise, the one who is lord of all, the one on whom the world is founded, the one who envelops all of universe within Him, the one who creates everything, the one who is inside every living creature, the one with primal knowledge, the one who is eternal and immortal. These benedictions are found, in essentially similar form but different context in more ancient Vedic texts, for example in Rig Veda 1.114.8, 3.62.10 and 10.121.3, Vajasaneyi Samhita 16.16 and 32.2, Brihadaranyaka Upanishad 4.3.32, and elsewhere.

The verses of the fourth Adhyaya of the Shvetashvatara Upanishad, with explicit references to Rudra and Shiva, and the text in general, became important to Shaiva Siddhanta, and to Shaivism. Scholars state that while Rudra is an oft mentioned Vedic deity, the adjective Shiva for him in the Shvetashvatara Upanishad was new, and simply meant "kind, graceful, blessed, blissful". The word "Shiva" is mentioned as an adjective seven times in the Upanishad, in verses 3.5, 4.14, 4.16, 4.18, 5.14, 6.11, 6.18. This is among the earliest mentions of Shiva in ancient Sanskrit literature, and possibly evidence that the name was crystallizing as the proper name of the highest God in Vedic times. The Shvetashvatara Upanishad has served the same historic role for Shaivism, as the Bhagavad Gita has served for Vaishnavism.

=== Brahman is everywhere, knowledge liberates – Fifth Adhyāya ===
The fifth chapter of the Upanishad shifts back to using the word Brahman, instead of Rudra, and presents a threefold Brahman-Atman, all part of infinite highest Brahman, and contained in Oneness. The first theme is of "default state of ignorance" in human beings, the second is "realized state of knowledge", and third is of elevated eternal omnipresent Brahman that embraces both. The text states that ignorance is perishable and temporary, while knowledge is immortal and permanent. Knowledge is deliverance, knowledge liberates, asserts the Upanishad.

The fifth chapter is notable for the mention of word Kapila in verse 5.2. The interpretation of this verse has long been disputed as either referring to sage Kapila – the founder of atheistic/non-theistic Samkhya school of Hinduism, or simply referring to the color "red".

The fifth chapter is also notable for verse 5.10, regarding the genderlessness of the Brahman-Atman (Self), that is present in every being. This view expressed in Shvetashvatara Upanishad is also found in Aitareya and Taittiriya Āraṇyakas.

नैव स्त्री न पुमानेष न चैवायं नपुंसकः ।
यद्यच्छरीरमादत्ते तेने तेने स युज्यते ॥ १० ॥

It is not woman, it is not man, nor is it neuter;
whatever body it takes, with that it is joined.

— Shvetashvatara Upanishad 5.10

=== One Deva (God), the self within all beings – Sixth Adhyāya ===
The sixth chapter of the Shvetashvatara Upanishad opens by acknowledging the existence of two competing theories: of Nature as the primal cause, and Time as the primal cause. Verse 6.1 declares these two theories as "completely wrong". It is Deva (God, Brahman) that is the primal cause, asserts the text, and then proceeds to describe what God is and what is God's nature. He is the knower, the creator of time, the quality of everything, the Sarva-vidyah (सर्वविद्यः, all knowledge), states Shvetashvatara Upanishad. This God, asserts the text, is one, and is in each human being and in all living creatures. This God is the Self (Atman) veiled inside man, the inmost self inside all living beings, and that the primal cause is within oneself. The Upanishad, states it as follows (abridged),

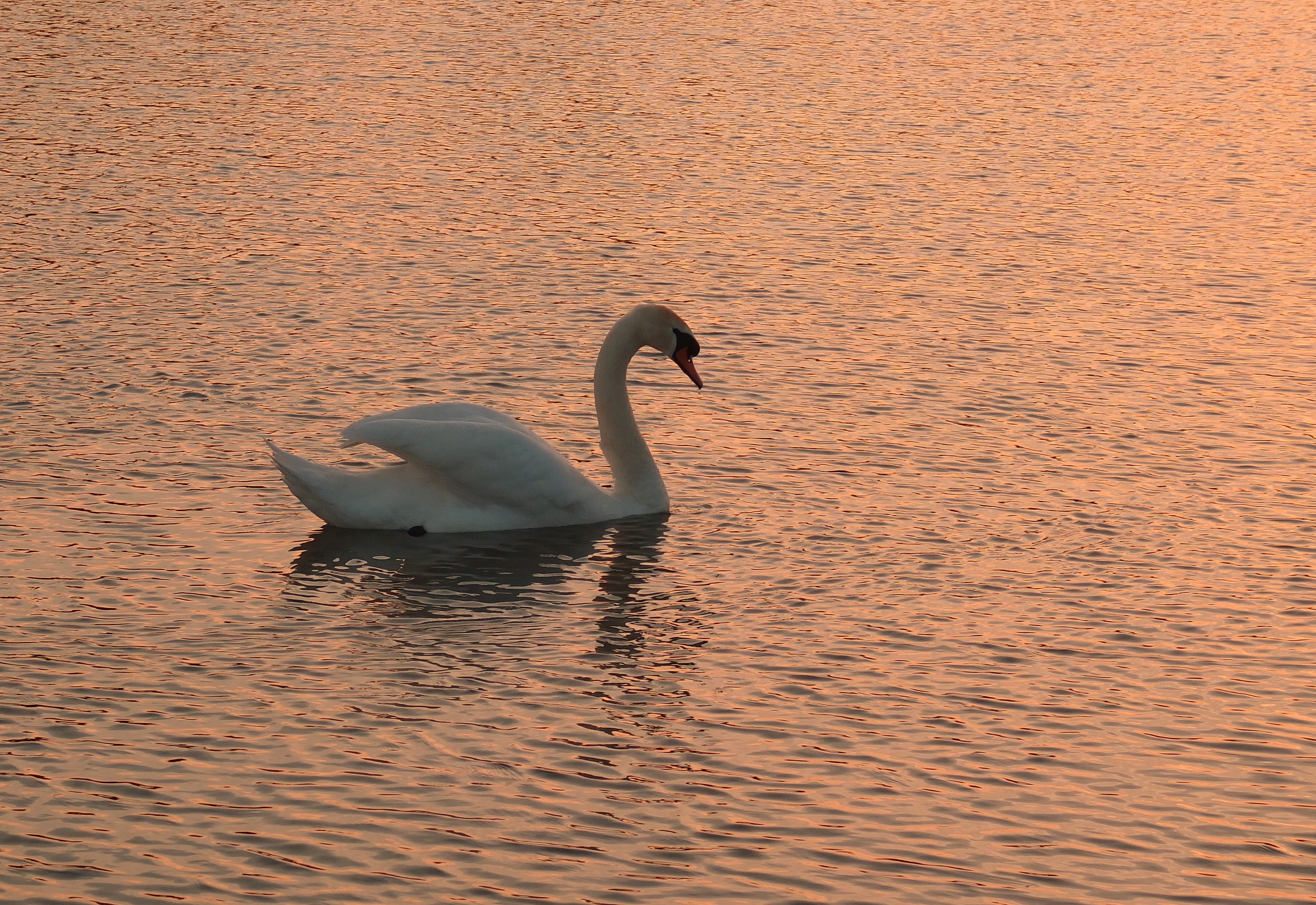
Swan (Haṁsa, हंस) is the frequently used symbolic term for the Highest Self in Vedic literature, and is used in verses 6.15-6.16 of Shvetashvatara Upanishad to discuss Moksha.

Let us know that highest great lord of lords, the highest deity of deities, the master of masters,
his high power is revealed as manifold, as inherent, acting as force and knowledge.
There is no master of his in the world, no ruler of his, not even a sign of him,
He is the cause, the lord of the lords of the organs, and there is of him neither parent nor lord.
He is the one God, hidden in all beings, all-pervading, the self within all beings,
watching over all works, dwelling in all beings, the witness, the perceiver, the only one, free from qualities.
The wise who perceive Him dwelling within their self, to them belongs eternal happiness and serenity, not to others,
He who knows this God as primal cause, through Sāṁkhya (reason, reflection) and Yoga (self-discipline), achieves Mukti (freedom, moksha).

— Shvetashvatara Upanishad 6.7-6.13

=== End of misery and sorrow, the joyful Deva, seeking His refuge for freedom – Sixth Adhyāya ===
The Upanishad, in verses 6.14 through 6.20 discusses Deva (God), interchangeably with Brahman-Atman, and its importance in achieving moksha (liberation, freedom). The text asserts that Deva is the light of everything, and He is the "one swan" of the universe. It is He who is self-made, the supreme spirit, the quality in everything, the consciousness of conscious, the master of primeval matter and of the spirit (individual Self), the cause of transmigration of the Self, and it is his knowledge that leads to deliverance and release from all sorrow, misery, bondage and fear. It is impossible to end sorrow, confusion and consequences of evil, without knowing this joyful, blissful Deva, asserts the sixth chapter of the Shvetashvatara Upanishad. It is to this Deva (divine Self) that, states the text, "I go, being desirous of liberation, for refuge and shelter". Shvetashvatara Upanishad does not extensively discuss the concept of bhakti (devotion), however, in verse 6.23, it does touch upon the importance of bhakti:

Only in a man who has the deepest love for God, and who shows the same love towards his teacher as towards God, do these points declared by the Noble One [mahatma] shine forth

— Shvetashvatara Upanishad 6.23

== Reception ==
Ancient and medieval Indian scholars left many Bhasya (review, commentary) on Shvetashvatara Upanishad. These include those attributed to Adi Shankara, Vijnanatma, Shankarananda, and Narayana Tirtha. However, given the nature of open scholarship in Indian traditions, it is unclear if some of these commentaries are exclusive works of a single author, or are they partially or completely the work of another later scholar. For example, the style, the inconsistencies, the citation method, the colophons in the commentary on Shvetashvatara Upanishad as it survives in modern form, and attributed to Shankara, makes it doubtful that it was written in the surviving form by Shankara. Rather, most scholars consider it likely that the Shvetashvatara commentary attributed to Shankara was remodeled and interpolated by one or more later authors.

Chakravarti calls the Shvetashvatara Upanishad as the earliest textual exposition of a systematic philosophy of Shaivism. Flood states that it elevated Rudra to the status of Īśa ("Lord"), a god with cosmological functions such as those later attributed to Shiva.

=== Epilogue's loving devotion to God debate ===
The last of three epilogue verses of the Shvetashvatara Upanishad, 6.23, uses the word Bhakti as follows,

यस्य देवे परा भक्तिः यथा देवे तथा गुरौ ।
तस्यैते कथिता ह्यर्थाः प्रकाशन्ते महात्मनः ॥ २३ ॥

He who has highest Bhakti (love, devotion) of Deva (God),
just like his Deva, so for his Guru (teacher),
To him who is high-minded,
these teachings will be illuminating.

— Shvetashvatara Upanishad 6.23

This verse is notable for the use of the word Bhakti, and has been widely cited as among the earliest mentions of "the love of God". Scholars have debated whether this phrase is authentic or later insertion into the Upanishad, and whether the terms "Bhakti" and "God" meant the same in this ancient text as they do in the modern era Bhakti traditions found in India. Max Muller states that the word Bhakti appears only in one last verse of the epilogue, could have been a later addition and may not be theistic as the word was later used in much later Sandilya Sutras. Grierson as well as Carus note that the first epilogue verse 6.21 is also notable for its use of the word Deva Prasada (देवप्रसाद, grace or gift of God), but add that Deva in the epilogue of the Shvetashvatara Upanishad refers to "pantheistic Brahman" and the closing credit to sage Shvetashvatara in verse 6.21 can mean "gift or grace of his Self".

=== Samkhya versus Vedanta interpretations debate ===
Scholars have long debated whether the Shvetashvatara Upanishad follows or opposed the theories of the Samkhya school of Hinduism. The Upanishad, as it develops its arguments, deploys many techniques of counting and enumeration found in Samkhya school, but such enumeration is not exclusive to Samkhya school and is also found in the Samhitas of the Vedas.

No doubt there are expressions in this [Shvetashvatara] Upanishad which remind us of technical terms used at a later time in the Samkhya system of philosophy, but of Samkhya doctrines, which I had myself formerly suspected in this Upanishad, I can on closer study find very little.

— Max Muller

Paul Deussen makes a similar conclusion as Max Muller, and states in his review of verse 1.3 of the Shvetashvatara Upanishad,

The individual Self does not comprise Purusha and Prakrti (shakti) which is independent of him together with its gunas (sattvam, rajas, tamas) but it is the God's own power (deva-atman-shakti) which, veiled under its own qualities (svagunah), appears as the Self. – The opposition to the Samkhya doctrines cannot be expressed in more pungent words.

— Paul Deussen

EH Johnston presents another perspective on Samkhya theories and dualistic themes in the Shvetashvatara Upanishad.

=== Monotheistic, pantheistic or monist text debate ===
Scholars have also expressed varying views whether Shvetashvatara Upanishad is a monotheistic, pantheistic or monistic text. Doris Srinivasan states that the Upanishad is a treatise on theism, but it creatively embeds a variety of divine images, an inclusive language that allows "three Vedic definitions for personal deity". The Upanishad includes verses wherein God can be identified with the Supreme (Brahman-Atman, Self) in Vedanta monistic theosophy, verses that support dualistic view of Samkhya doctrines, as well as the synthetic novelty of triple Brahman where a triune exists as the divine Self (Deva, theistic God), individual Self and nature (Prakrti, matter). Hiriyanna interprets the text to be introducing "personal theism" in the form of Shiva, with a shift to monotheism but in henotheistic context where the individual is encouraged to discover his own definition and sense of God. Robert Hume interprets the Shvetashvatara Upanishad to be discussing a pantheistic God.

== See also ==
- Vedas
- Upanishads
- Ishvara
- Bhagavan

== Sources ==
- Chakravati, Mahadev (1994). The Concept of Rudra-Śiva Through The Ages. Delhi: Motilal Banarsidass. ISBN 81-208-0053-2. (Second Revised Edition; Reprint, Delhi, 2002).
- Flood, Gavin (1996). An Introduction to Hinduism. Cambridge: Cambridge University Press. ISBN 978-0521438780.
- Olivelle, Patrick (1998), The Early Upanishads, Oxford University Press
