= Moksha =

Liberation from rebirth in Hinduism, Buddhism, Jainism and Sikhism

Translations of Moksha
- English: Emancipation, liberation, release (from rebirth)
- Sanskrit: मोक्ष (IAST: mokṣa)
- Assamese: মোক্ষ (mokkho)
- Balinese: ᬫᭀᬓ᭄ᬲ (moksa)
- Bengali: মোক্ষ (mokkho)
- Hindi: मोक्ष (mokṣa)
- Javanese: ꦩꦺꦴꦏ꧀ꦱ (moksa)
- Kannada: ಮೋಕ್ಷ (mōkṣa)
- Kashmiri: موٗکش (mōkṣ)
- Malayalam: മോക്ഷം (mōkṣaṁ)
- Marathi: मोक्ष (mokṣa)
- Nepali: मोक्ष (mokṣa)
- Odia: ମୋକ୍ଷ (mokṣa)
- Punjabi: ਮੋਖ / موکھ (mokh)
- Tamil: வீடுபேறு (vīdupēru)
- Telugu: మోక్షము (mōkṣaṁu)
- Urdu: موکش (mokash)
- Gujarati: મોક્ષ (mōkṣa)

Translations of Moksha
- Chinese: 解脫 (Pinyin: jiětuō)
- Japanese: 解脱 (Rōmaji: gedatsu)
- Korean: 해탈 (RR: haetal)
- Sinhala: මෝක්ෂ (moksha)
- Tagalog: moksha
- Thai: โมกษะ (RTGS: moksa)
- Vietnamese: giải thoát

Moksha (/ˈmoʊkʃə/, UK also /ˈmɒkʃə/; Sanskrit: मोक्ष, mokṣa), also called vimoksha, vimukti, and mukti, is a term in Jainism, Buddhism, Hinduism, and Sikhism for freedom, liberation, or release from 'impurities' (klesa) such as ignorance (avidhya) and 'earthly desires', and from saṃsāra, the cycle of death and rebirth.

In Hindu traditions, moksha is a central concept and the utmost aim of human life. It can be seen as a perfection of living according to dharma, the eternal rules for virtues and righteous living. Moksha may be attained while living, or being embodied (jivanmukti), or after dying, when atman is disembodied (videhamukti).

== Etymology ==
Moksha is derived from the Sanskrit root word, muc, "to free", let go, release, "liberation from the cycle of death and rebirth (saṃsāra)". According to Jain scriptures, it is a combination of two Sanskrit words, moh (attachment) and kshay (its destruction).

== Definitions ==
The understanding of moksha varies between various schools of Indian religions. Moksha means freedom from rebirth or saṃsāra, but the understanding of what is liberated and how this liberation occurs varies. Hinduism and Jainism presuppose the existence of an enduring self, while Buddhism rejects the existence of such an enduring self. Emphasis may be placed on ethical action and devotion as the means to moksha, or on meditation and insight. This liberation can be attained while one is on earth (jivanmukti), or eschatologically (karmamukti, videhamukti).

The words moksha, nirvana (nibbana) and kaivalya are sometimes used synonymously, (Note: For example, the Adhyatma Upanishad uses all three words nirvana, kaivalya and moksha (Verses 12, 16, 69, 70) because they all refer to the liberated state.) (Note: Jaini (2000, p. 168): "Moksa and Nirvana are synonymous in Jainism")

Nirvana and moksha, in all traditions, represent resting in one's true essence, named Purusha or Atman, or pointed at as Nirvana, but described in a very different way. Loy has argued that there is not a difference in experience between nirvana in Buddhism and moksha in Advaita Vedanta. Some scholars, states Jayatilleke, assert that the Nirvana of Buddhism is the same as the Brahman in Hinduism, a view other scholars and he disagree with.

Kaivalya, a concept akin to moksha, rather than nirvana, is found in some schools of Hinduism such as the Yoga school. Kaivalya is the realization of aloofness with liberating knowledge of one's self and disentanglement from the muddled mind and cognitive apparatus. For example, Patanjali's Yoga Sutra suggests:

After the dissolution of avidya (ignorance),
comes removal of communion with material world,
this is the path to Kaivalyam.

— Yoga Sutra (Sadhana Pada), 2:24–25

According to some traditions, moksha can attained at the end of life, not during (videhamukti), while other traditions teach that moksha can be achieved during life in the form of a state of liberation, known as jivan-mukti.

== Characteristics ==
=== As a state of perfection ===
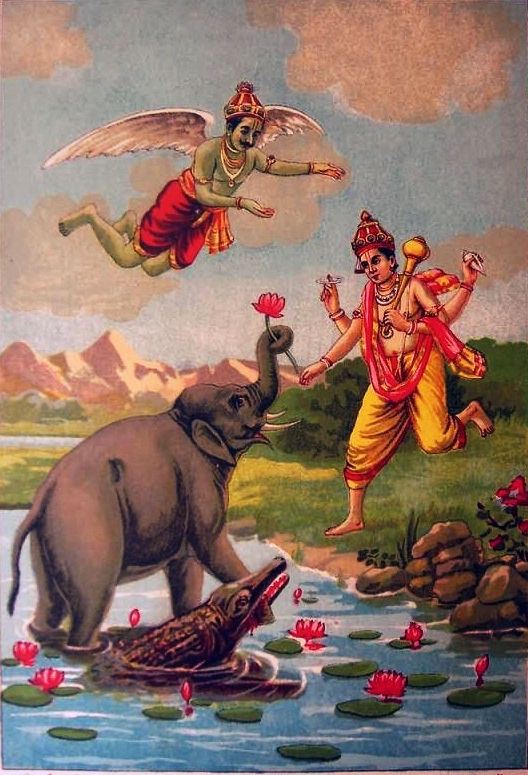
Gajendra Moksha (pictured) is a symbolic tale in Vaishnavism. The elephant Gajendra enters a lake where a crocodile (Huhu) clutches his leg and becomes his suffering. Despite his pain, Gajendra constantly remembers Vishnu, who then liberates him. Gajendra symbolically represents human beings, Huhu represents sins, and the lake is saṃsāra.

Many schools of Hinduism according to Daniel Ingalls, see moksha as a state of perfection. The concept was seen as a natural goal beyond dharma. Moksha, in the epics and ancient literature of Hinduism, is seen as achievable by the same techniques necessary to practice dharma. Self-discipline is the path to dharma, moksha is self-discipline that is so perfect that it becomes unconscious, second nature. Dharma is thus a means to moksha.

The Samkhya school of Hinduism suggests that one of the paths to moksha is to magnify one's sattvam. (Note: One of three qualities or habits of an individual; sattvam represents spiritual purity; sattvic people, claims Samkhya school, are those who see world's welfare as a spiritual principle. See cited Ingalls reference.) To magnify one's sattvam, one must develop oneself where one's sattvam becomes one's instinctive nature. Many schools of Hinduism thus understood dharma and moksha as two points of a single journey of life, a journey for which the viaticum was discipline and self-training.

=== Purification ===
Moksha in this life includes psychological liberation from adhyasa (fears besetting one's life) and avidya (ignorance or anything that is not true knowledge). According to the Vedas, one can attain moksha by giving up shadripu ( kama, lobha, krodha, moha, mada and matsarya).

Klaus Klostermaier suggests that moksha in Hinduism implies a setting-free of hitherto fettered faculties, a removing of obstacles to an unrestricted life, permitting a person to be more truly a person in the full sense; the concept presumes an unused human potential of creativity, compassion and understanding which had been blocked and shut out.

=== Jivanmukti and videhamukti ===
Some traditions posit that moksha can be experienced while alive (jivanmukti), while other traditions posit that it can be attained only after death (videhamukti).

==== Etymology ====
Jīvanmukti (Sanskrit: जीवन्मुक्ति:) means, "liberation during life, liberation before death", "emancipation while still alive", "emancipated while still alive". Other translations include "self realization", "living liberation", "enlightenment", "liberated soul", or "self liberation".

Videhamukti (Sanskrit: विदेहमुक्ति) is a Sanskrit compound with the following parts: the prefix -वि (-vi, "without," or "apart from"); the noun देह (deha, body), and the abstract noun मुक्ति (mukti, "liberation", deriving from the verb मुच् muc- "to liberate"). The term is defined as "deliverance through release from the body." or "liberation attained at the time of leaving one's body."

A videhamukta is a person who has attained the state of videhamukti.

When a jivanmukta dies, he achieves paramukti and becomes a paramukta. A jivanmukta experiences liberation while alive and also after death i.e., after becoming paramukta, while a videhamukta experiences liberation only after death.

==== Views ====
The Nyaya, Vaisesika and Mimamsa traditions consider moksha as possible only after death. (Note: Note: Each school has a different meaning for moksha. For example, Mimamsa school considers moksha as release into svarga (heaven), it does not recognize samsara; while Nyaya school considers moksha as linked to samsara and a release from it; See: The Purva-Mimamsa Sutra of Jaimini, Transl: M.L. Sandal (1923), Chapter II, Pada I and Chapter VI, Pada I through VIII; Also see Klaus Klostermaier, A Survey of Hinduism, 3rd Edition, ISBN 978-0-7914-7082-4, Chapter 26)

The Samkhya, Yoga, and Vedanta schools posit that liberation and freedom can be attained within one's lifetime, and the individual who has experienced this state is called a jivanmukta (self-realized person). In the Vedanta school, the Advaita sub-school concludes moksha is possible in this life, while Dvaita, Visistadvaita, Shuddhadvait sub-schools of Vedanta tradition believes that moksha is a continuous event, one assisted by loving devotion to God, that extends from this life to post-mortem. Beyond these six orthodox schools, some heterodox schools of Hindu tradition, such as Carvaka, deny there is a soul or after life moksha.

==== Charateristics of a jivanmukta ====
Dozens of Upanishads, including those from the middle Upanishadic period, mention or describe the characteristics of a jivanmukta. (Note: See for example Muktika Upanishad, Varaha Upanishad, Adhyatma Upanishad, Sandilya Upanishad, Tejobindu Upanishad, etc.; in K.N. Aiyar (Transl. 1914), Thirty Minor Upanishads, University of Toronto Robart Library Archives, Canada.)

According to Naradaparivrajaka Upanishad, the liberated individual is described as possessing the following qualities:

- He is not bothered by disrespect and endures cruel words, he treats others with respect regardless of how others treat him;
- When confronted by an angry person, he does not return anger, but instead replies with soft and kind words;
- Even if tortured, he speaks and trusts the truth;
- He does not crave for blessings or expect praise from others;
- He never injures or harms any life or being (ahimsa), he is intent in promoting the welfare of all beings; (Note: see also Sandilya Upanishad for ahimsa and other virtues; Quote: "तत्र हिंसा नाम मनोवाक्कायकर्मभिः सर्वभूतेषु सर्वदा क्लेशजननम्"; Aiyar translates this as: He practices Ahimsa – no injury or harm to any living being at any time through actions of his body, his speech or in his mind; K.N. Aiyar (Transl. 1914), Thirty Minor Upanishads, University of Toronto Robart Library Archives, Canada, pp 173–174)
- He is as comfortable being alone as in the presence of others;
- He is as comfortable with a bowl, at the foot of a tree in a tattered robe without help, as when he is in a mithuna (union of mendicants), grama (village) and nagara (city);
- He doesn't care about or wear ṣikha (tuft of hair on the back of head for religious reasons), nor the holy thread across his body. To him, knowledge is sikha, knowledge is the holy thread, knowledge alone is supreme. Outer appearances and rituals do not matter to him, only knowledge matters;
- For him there is no invocation nor dismissal of deities, no mantra nor non-mantra, no prostrations nor worship of gods, goddess or ancestors, nothing other than knowledge of Self;
- He is humble, high-spirited, of clear and steady mind, straightforward, compassionate, patient, indifferent, courageous, speaks firmly and with sweet words.

== Development of the concept ==
=== Sramanic movements ===
It is unclear when the core ideas of samsara and moksha developed in ancient India. J. A. B. van Buitenen writes that the concept of moksha did not develop as a result of the concept of samsara. Patrick Olivelle suggests these ideas likely originated with the sramanic movements in the first millennium BCE. The concepts of mukti and moksha, suggests J. A. B. van Buitenen, seem traceable to yogis mentioned in Vedic sources, with long hair, who chose to live on the fringes of society, given to self-induced states of intoxication and ecstasy, possibly accepted as medicine-men and "sadhus" by ancient Indian society. Moksha to these early concept-developers, was the abandonment of the established order, not in favor of anarchy, but in favor of self-realization, to achieve release from this world.

=== Vedic thought ===
The concept of moksha, according to Daniel Ingalls, represented one of the many expansions in Vedic ideas of life and the afterlife.

The oldest Vedic texts are primarily concerned with keeping the cosmos in order through rites, rather than going to heaven. Nevertheless, the benefits of the rites included being remembered after death. The texts outline two paths after death. One is going to a heaven such as the realm of Indra. This is temporary— one is reborn after one's merits run out. Heaven and spiritual powers are seen as obstacles to reaching the ultimate goal of moksha, and so are advised to be avoided. The other path is moksha. Once one attains moksha, one is not reborn in this world.

=== Upanishads ===
The concept is first expressed in the ancient Sanskrit verses and early Upanishads with the verb mucyate, which means "freed" or "released". In the middle and later Upanishads, such as the Svetasvatara and Maitri, the word moksha appears and begins becoming an important concept.

In the Upanishads, the discussion of moksha came out of a ritualistic context. While priests used to perform rituals to please deities, they began to see the rituals as a reenactment of the cosmos. The cosmos was reflected not just in the ritual, but in the self, too. So a person could use this knowledge and the rite to transcend the human body and return to a state before the cosmos became manifest. This gave way to prioritizing knowledge of the principle behind the ritual, rather than the physical parts of the ritual.

By the middle to late Upanishadic period, the emphasis shifted to knowledge, and ritual activities were considered irrelevant to the attainment of moksha. Yogic moksha replaced Vedic rituals with personal development and meditation, with hierarchical creation of the ultimate knowledge in self as the path to moksha. Yogic moksha principles were accepted in many other schools of Hinduism, albeit with differences. For example, Adi Shankara writes:

अर्थस्य निश्चयो दृष्टो विचारेण हितोक्तितः |
न स्नानेन न दानेन प्राणायमशतेन वा || १३ ||

By reflection, reasoning and instructions of teachers, the truth is known,
Not by ablutions, not by making donations, nor by performing hundreds of breath control exercises. || Verse 13 ||

— Vivekachudamani, 8th Century AD

The Katha Upanishad, a middle Upanishadic-era script dated to the second half of the first millennium BCE, is among the earliest expositions about saṃsāra and moksha. In Book I, Section III, the legend of boy Nachiketa asks Yama, the lord of death, to explain what causes saṃsāra and what leads to liberation. Naciketa inquires: what causes sorrow? Yama explains that suffering and saṃsāra results from a life that is lived absent-mindedly, with impurity, with neither the use of intelligence nor self-examination, where neither mind nor senses are guided by one's atma (soul, self). Liberation comes from a life lived with inner purity, alert mind, led by buddhi (reason, intelligence), realization of the Supreme Self (purusha) who dwells in all beings. Kathaka Upanishad asserts knowledge liberates, knowledge is freedom. Katha Upanishad also explains the role of yoga in personal liberation, moksha.

The Svetasvatara Upanishad, another middle-era Upanishad written after Kathaka Upanishad, begins with questions such as why is man born? what is the primal cause behind the universe? what causes joy and sorrow in life? It then examines the various theories, that were then existing, about saṃsāra and release from bondage. Svetasvatara claims that bondage results from ignorance, illusion or delusion; deliverance comes from knowledge. The Supreme Being dwells in every being, he is the primal cause, he is the eternal law, he is the essence of everything, he is nature, he is not a separate entity. Liberation comes to those who know Supreme Being is present as the Universal Spirit and Principle, just as they know butter is present in milk. Such realization, claims Svetasvatara, come from self-knowledge and self-discipline; and this knowledge and realization is liberation from transmigration, the final goal of the Upanishad.

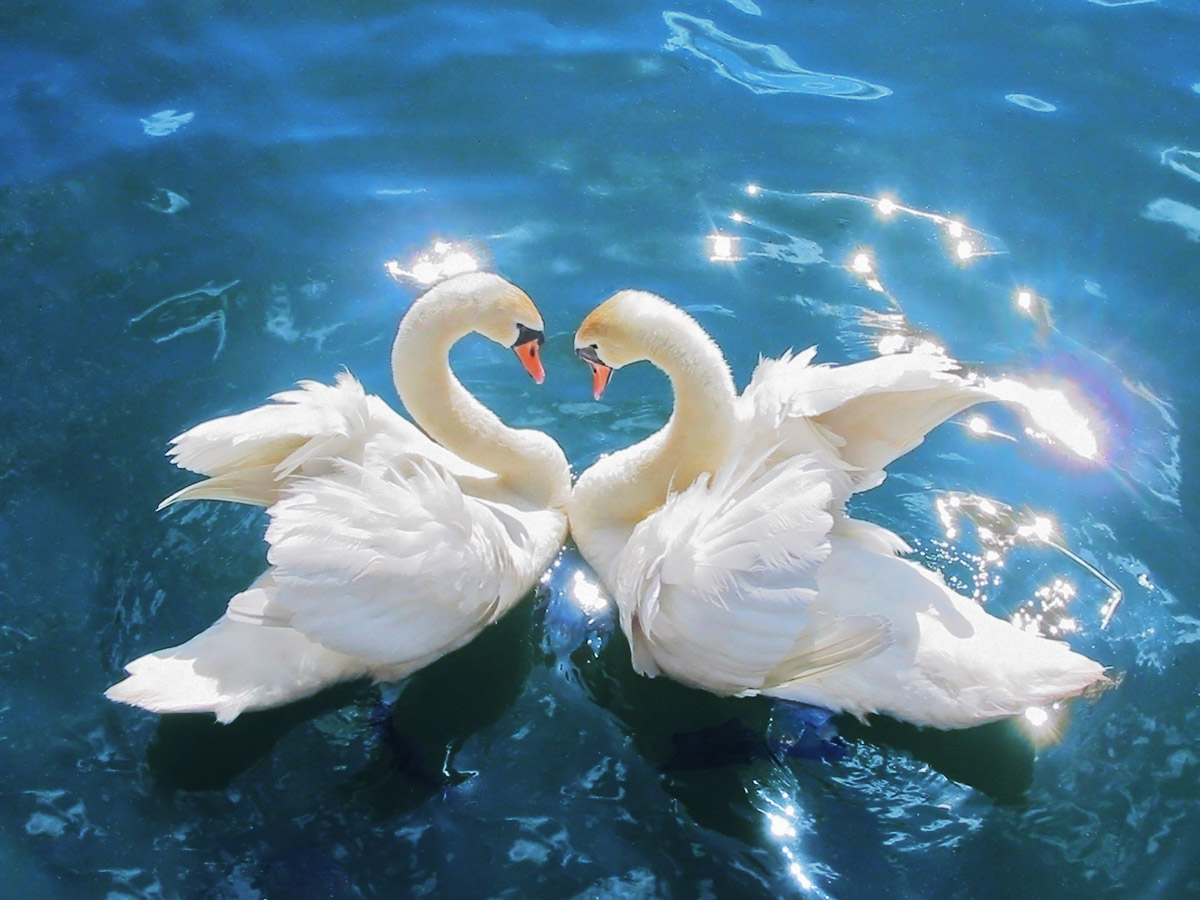
The Hindu goddess of knowledge, learning and creative arts, Sarasvati, is sometimes depicted alongside a swan, which is a symbol of spiritual perfection, liberation and moksha. The symbolism of Sarasvati and the swan is that knowledge and moksha go together.

Starting with the middle Upanishad era, moksha – or equivalent terms such as mukti and kaivalya – is a major theme in many Upanishads. For example, Sarasvati Rahasya Upanishad, one of several Upanishads of the bhakti school of Hinduism, starts out with prayers to Goddess Sarasvati. She is the Hindu goddess of knowledge, learning and creative arts; her name is a compound word of sara and sva, meaning "essence of self". After the prayer verses, the Upanishad inquires about the secret to freedom and liberation (mukti). Sarasvati's reply in the Upanishad is:

It was through me the Creator himself gained liberating knowledge,
I am being, consciousness, bliss, eternal freedom: unsullied, unlimited, unending.
My perfect consciousness shines your world, like a beautiful face in a soiled mirror,
Seeing that reflection I wish myself you, an individual soul, as if I could be finite!

A finite soul, an infinite Goddess – these are false concepts,
in the minds of those unacquainted with truth,
No space, my loving devotee, exists between your self and my self,
Know this and you are free. This is the secret wisdom.

— Sarasvati Rahasya Upanishad, Translated by Linda Johnsen

comes from self-knowledge and consciousness of oneness of supreme soul.

Paul Deussen interprets the Maitrayana Upanishad's teaching on moksha to come neither from the Vedanta school's doctrine (the knowledge of one's own Self as the Supreme Soul) nor from the Samkhya school's doctrine (distinction of the Purusha from what one is not), but from Vedic studies, observance of the Svadharma (personal duties), sticking to Asramas (stages of life).

=== Bhakti ===
Bhakti moksha created the third historical path, where neither rituals nor meditative self-development were the way, rather it was inspired by constant love and contemplation of God, which over time results in a perfect union with God. Some Bhakti schools evolved their ideas where God became the means and the end, transcending moksha; the fruit of bhakti is bhakti itself. In the history of Indian religious traditions, additional ideas and paths to moksha beyond these three, appeared over time.

=== Acceptance in Hindu-schools ===
The acceptance of the concept of moksha in some schools of Hindu philosophy was slow. These refused to recognize moksha for centuries, considering it irrelevant. The Mimamsa school, for example, denied the goal and relevance of moksha well into the 8th century AD, until the arrival of a Mimamsa scholar named Kumarila. Instead of moksha, the Mimamsa school of Hinduism considered the concept of heaven as sufficient to answer the question: what lay beyond this world after death. Other schools of Hinduism, over time, accepted the moksha concept and refined it over time.

== Hinduism ==
=== Sāmkhya and Yoga ===
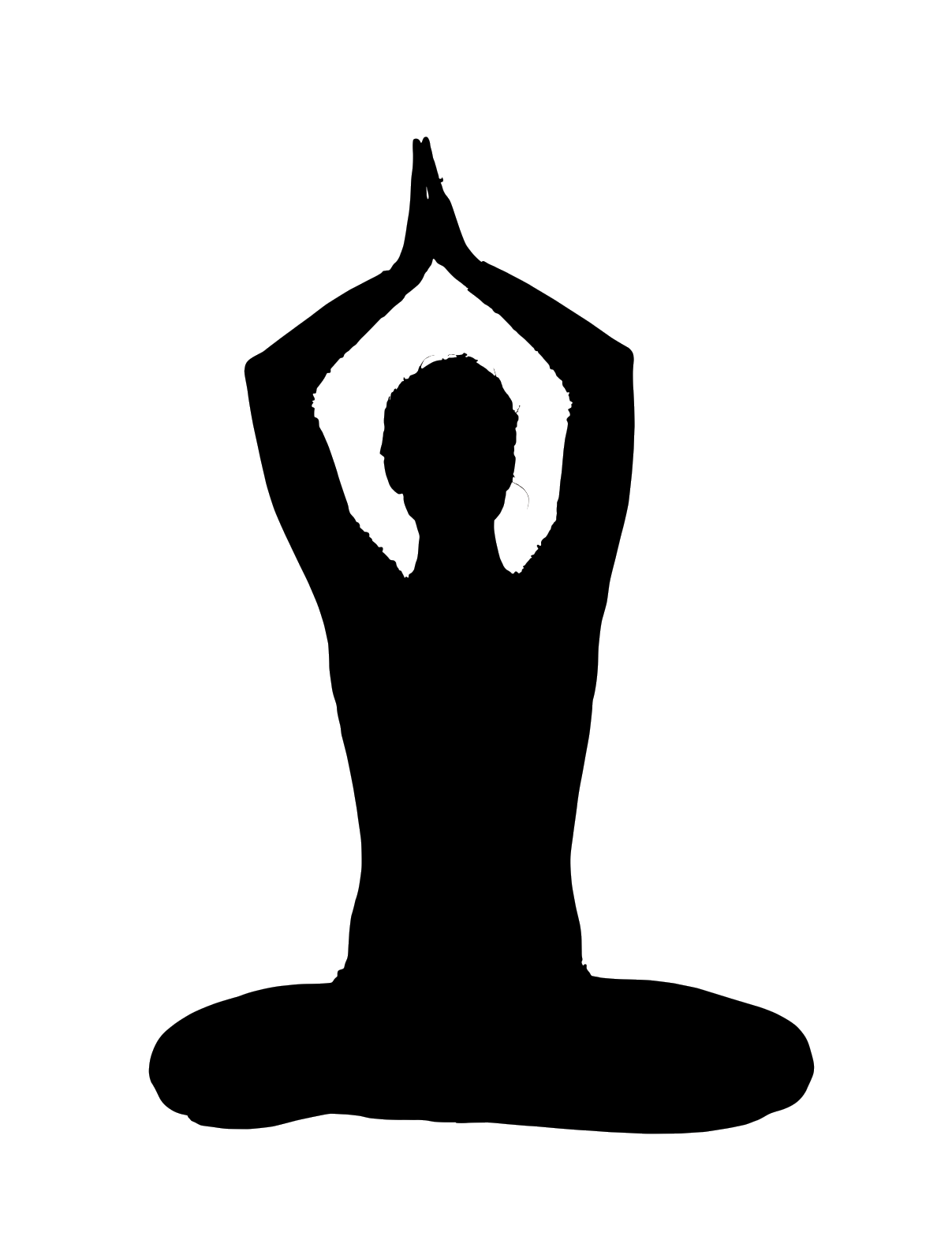
Mokṣha is a key concept in Yoga, where it is a state of "awakening", liberation and freedom in this life.,

Knut Jacobsen suggests that both Sāmkhya and Yoga systems of religious thought are mokshaśāstras, systems of salvific liberation and release. Sāmkhya is a system of interpretation, primarily a theory about the world. Yoga is both a theory and a practice. Yoga gained wide acceptance in ancient India, its ideas and practices became part of many religious schools in Hinduism, including those that were very different from Sāmkhya. The eight limbs of yoga can be interpreted as a way to liberation (moksha).

In Sāmkhya literature, liberation is commonly referred to as kaivalya. In this school, kaivalya means the realization of purusa, the principle of consciousness, as independent from mind and body, as different from prakrti. Like many schools of Hinduism, in Sāmkhya and Yoga schools, the emphasis is on the attainment of knowledge, vidyā or jñāna, as necessary for salvific liberation, moksha. Yoga's purpose is then seen as a means to remove the avidyā – that is, ignorance or misleading/incorrect knowledge about one self and the universe. It seeks to end ordinary reflexive awareness (cittavrtti nirodhah) with deeper, purer and holistic awareness (asamprājñāta samādhi). Yoga, during the pursuit of moksha, encourages practice (abhyāsa) with detachment (vairāgya), which over time leads to deep concentration (samādhi). Detachment means withdrawal from outer world and calming of mind, while practice means the application of effort over time. Such steps are claimed by Yoga school as leading to samādhi, a state of deep awareness, release and bliss called kaivalya.

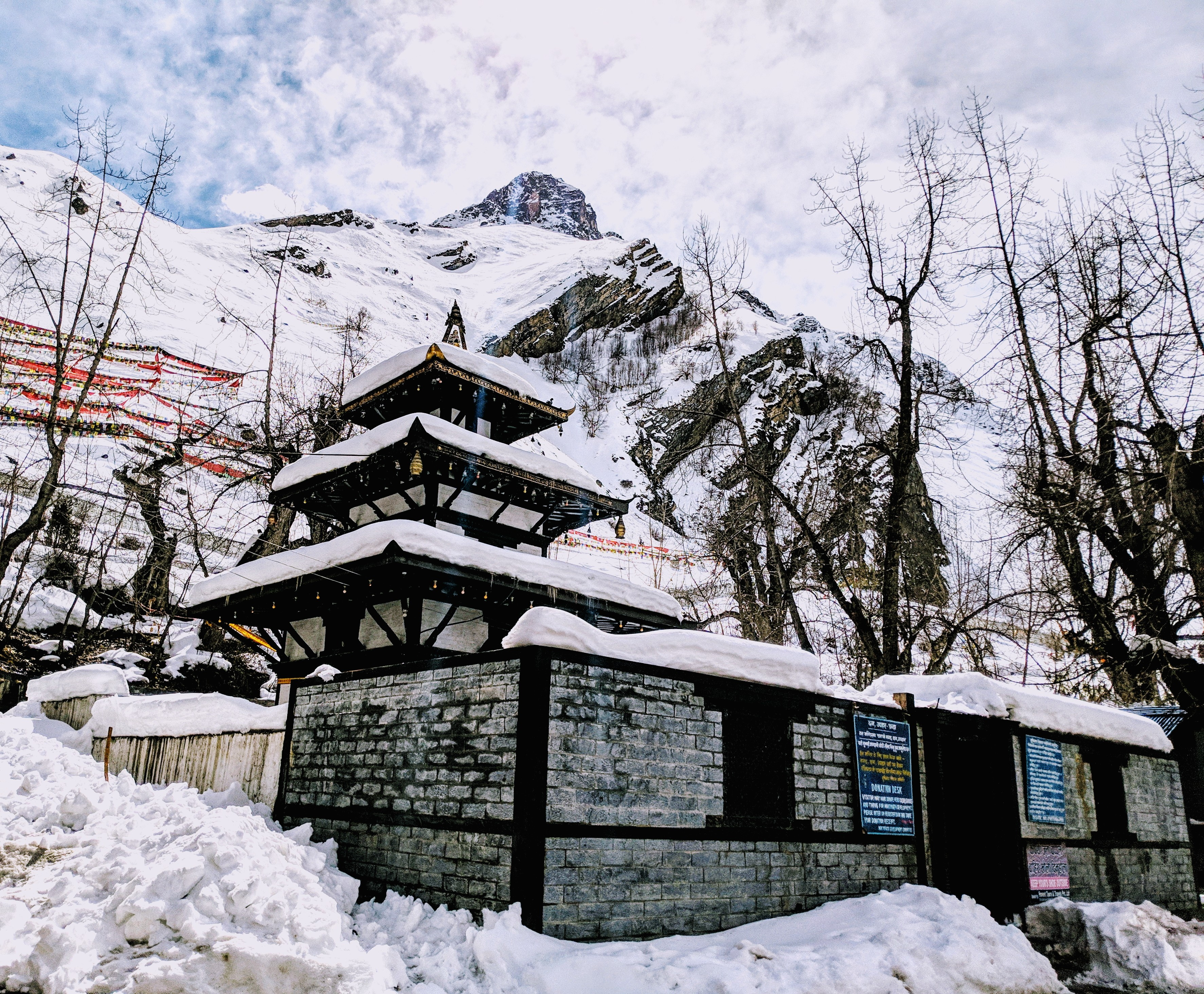
Muktinath Temple ('Lord of liberation or Moksha) at Mustang, Nepal - a pilgrimage place for Hindus and Buddhists.

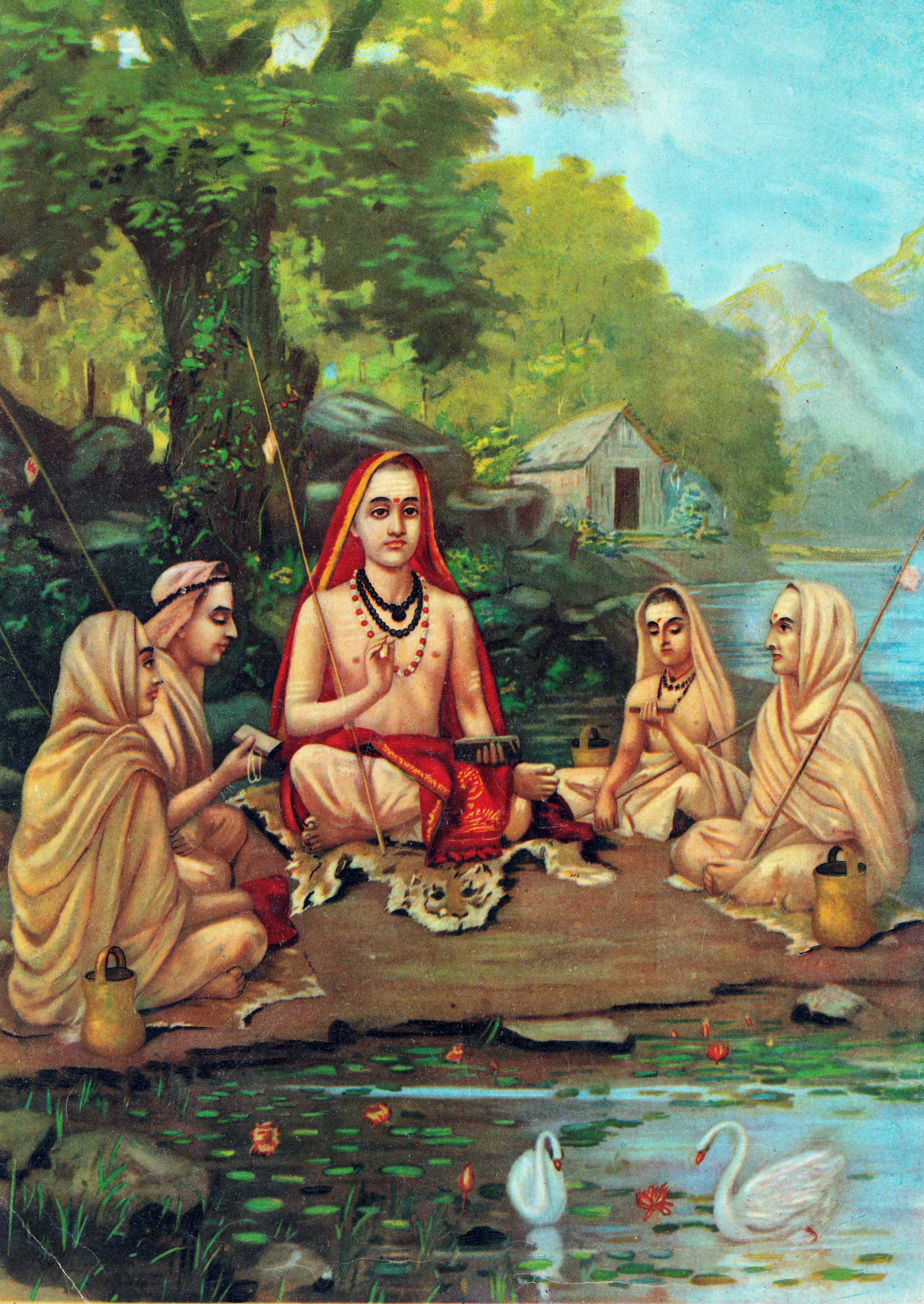
Jñāna yoga

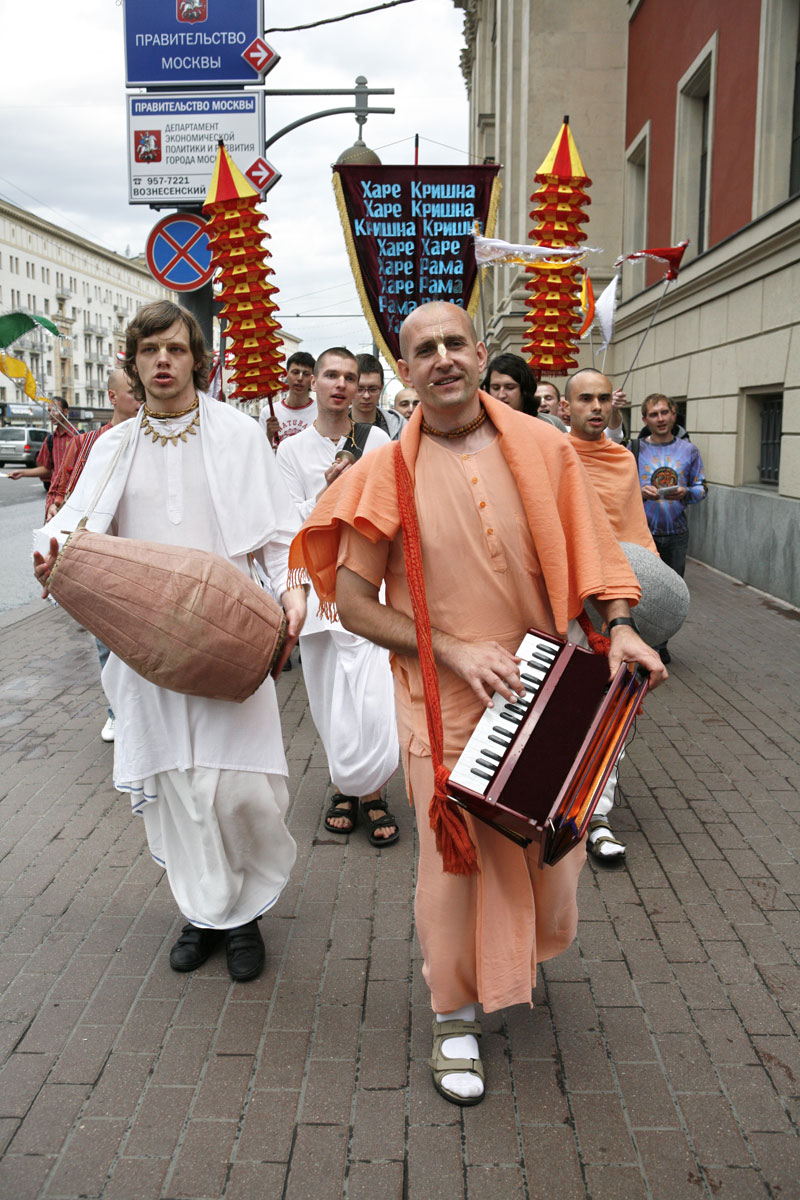
Bhakti yoga

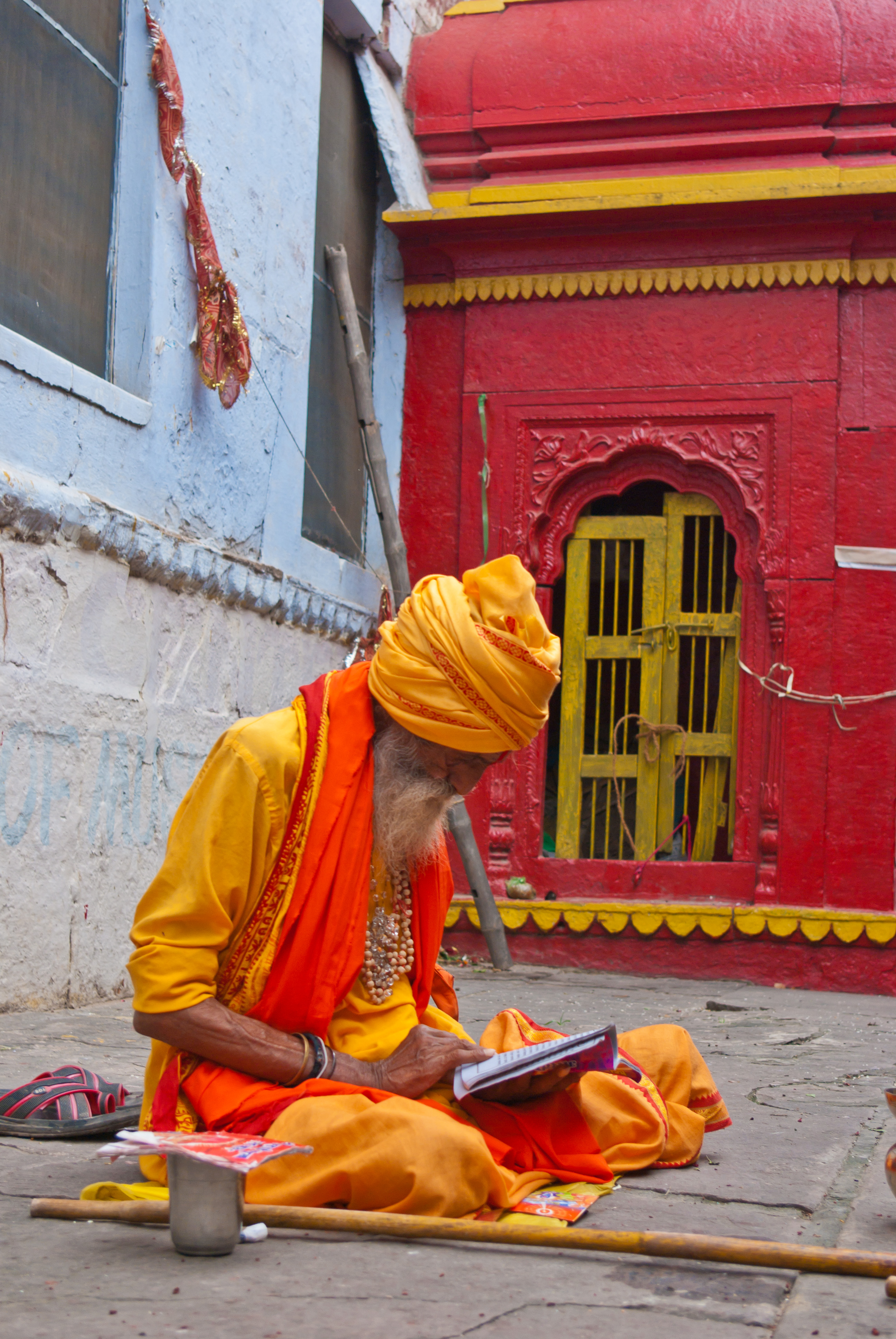
Rāja marga

Three of four paths of spirituality in Hinduism. Each path suggests a different way to moksha.

Yoga, or mārga (meaning "way" or "path"), in Hinduism is widely classified into four spiritual approaches. The first mārga is Jñāna Yoga, the way of knowledge. The second mārga is Bhakti Yoga, the way of loving devotion to God. The third mārga is Karma Yoga, the way of works. The fourth mārga is Rāja Yoga, the way of contemplation and meditation. These mārgas are part of different schools in Hinduism, and their definition and methods to moksha. For example, the Advaita Vedanta school relies on Jñāna Yoga in its teachings of moksha. The margas need not lead to all forms of moksha, according to some schools of Hinduism. For example, the Ekasarana dharma denies the sayujya form of mukti, where the complete absorption in God deprives jiva of the sweetness and bliss associated with bhakti. Madhavadeva begins the Namghoxa by declaring his admiration for devotees who do not prefer mukti.

=== Vedanta ===
Vedanta traditions share an understanding of moksha as not merely an absence of suffering, but a positive experience of ananda, or bliss. However, the specifics of understanding moksha vary in each of the more than seventeen sub-schools of Vedanta.

==== Advaita Vedanta ====
The Advaita tradition considers moksha achievable by removing avidya (ignorance) by knowledge. Moksha is seen as a final release from illusion, and through knowledge (anubhava) of one's own fundamental nature, which is Satcitananda. (Note: The description comprises the three Sanskrit words sat-chit-ananda: sat सत् (present participle); [Sanskrit root as, "to be"]: "Truth", "Absolute Being", Sat describes an essence that is pure and timeless, that never changes.; cit चित् (noun): "consciousness", "true consciousness", "to be consciousness of", "to understand", "to comprehend".; ānanda आनन्द (noun): "bliss", "true bliss", "happiness", "joy", "delight", "pleasure") Advaita holds there is no being/non-being distinction between Atman, Brahman, and Paramatman. True knowledge is a direct, permanent realization that the Atman and Brahman are one. This realization instantly removes ignorance and leads to moksha, and is considered timeless, eliminating the cycle of birth and death (samsara). Advaita Vedanta emphasizes Jnana Yoga as the means of achieving moksha. Bliss, claims this school, is the fruit of knowledge (vidya) and work (karma). If a desire for unity with Brahman is strong enough, moksha is considered achievable while alive.

Shankara takes desire for moksha itself to be a state of moksha. A guru, being the instrument to achieve moksha, is key. Those who are on their path to moksha (samnyasin), suggests Klaus Klostermaier, are quintessentially free individuals, without craving for anything in the worldly life, thus are neither dominated by, nor dominating anyone else.

Vivekachudamani, which literally means "Crown Jewel of Discriminatory Reasoning", is a book devoted to moksa in Advaita Vedanta philosophy. It explains what behaviors and pursuits lead to moksha, as well what actions and assumptions hinder moksha. The four essential conditions, according to Vivekachudamani, before one can commence on the path of moksha include (1) vivekah (discrimination, critical reasoning) between everlasting principles and fleeting world; (2) viragah (indifference, lack of craving) for material rewards; (3) samah (calmness of mind), and (4) damah (self restraint, temperance). The Brahmasutrabhasya adds to the above four requirements, the following: uparati (lack of bias, dispassion), titiksa (endurance, patience), sraddha (faith) and samadhana (intentness, commitment).

It explains one of many meditative steps on the path to moksha, as:

Beyond caste, creed, family or lineage,
That which is without name and form, beyond merit and demerit,
That which is beyond space, time and sense-objects,
You are that, God himself; Meditate this within yourself. ||Verse 254||

— Vivekachudamani, 8th Century CE

==== Dvaita ====
The Dvaita (dualism) traditions define moksha as the loving, eternal union with God and considered the highest perfection of existence. Dvaita schools suggest every soul encounters liberation differently. Dualist traditions (e.g. Vaishnava) see God as the object of love, for example, a personified monotheistic conception of Shiva, Vishnu or Adishakti. By immersing oneself in the love of God, one's karmas slough off, one's illusions decay, and truth is lived. Both the worshiped and worshiper gradually lose their illusory sense of separation and only One beyond all names remains. This is salvation to dualist schools of Hinduism. Dvaita Vedanta emphasizes Bhakti Yoga as the means of achieving moksha.

==== Vishishtadvaita ====
The Vishistadvaita tradition, primarily propounded by Ramanuja, defines avidya and moksha differently from the Advaita tradition. To Ramanuja, avidya is a focus on the self, and vidya is a focus on a loving god. The Vishistadvaita school argues that other schools of Hinduism create a false sense of agency in individuals, which makes the individual think oneself as potential or self-realized god. Such ideas, claims Ramanuja, decay to materialism, hedonism and self worship. Individuals forget Ishvara (God). Mukti, to Vishistadvaita school, is release from such avidya, towards the intuition and eternal union with God. While the jiva attains equality with Brahman in moksha, it still retains its individuality.

=== Nyaya ===
The Nyaya school does not take moksha to be a state of bliss, but only a complete absence of suffering.

=== Mokṣa in Balinese Hinduism ===
Balinese Hinduism incorporates moksha as one of five tattvas. The other four are: brahman (the one supreme god head, not to be confused with Brahmin), atma (soul or spirit), karma (actions and reciprocity, causality), samsara (principle of rebirth, reincarnation). Moksha, in Balinese Hindu belief, is the possibility of unity with the divine; it is sometimes referred to as nirwana.

== Buddhism ==
In Buddhism the term "moksha" is uncommon, but an equivalent term is vimutti, "release". In the suttas two forms of release are mentioned, namely ceto-vimutti, "deliverance of mind," and panna-vimutti, "deliverance through wisdom" (insight). Ceto-vimutti is related to the practice of dhyana, while panna-vimutti is related to the development of insight. According to Gombrich, the distinction may be a later development, which resulted in a change of doctrine, regarding the practice of dhyana to be insufficient for final liberation.

With release comes Nirvana (Pali: Nibbana), "blowing out", "quenching", or "becoming extinguished" of the fires of the passions and of self-view. It is a "timeless state" in which there is no more becoming.

Nirvana ends the cycle of Dukkha and rebirth in the six realms of saṃsāra. (Note: Ending rebirth: Graham Harvey: "The Third Noble Truth is nirvana. The Buddha tells us that an end to suffering is possible, and it is nirvana. Nirvana is a "blowing out," just as a candle flame is extinguished in the wind, from our lives in samsara. It connotes an end to rebirth"; Spiro: "The Buddhist message then, as I have said, is not simply a psychological message, i.e. that desire is the cause of suffering because unsatisfied desire produces frustration. It does contain such a message to be sure; but more importantly it is an eschatological message. Desire is the cause of suffering because desire is the cause of rebirth; and the extinction of desire leads to deliverance from suffering because it signals release from the Wheel of Rebirth."; John J. Makransky: "The third noble truth, cessation (nirodha) or nirvana, represented the ultimate aim of Buddhist practice in the Abhidharma traditions: the state free from the conditions that created samsara. Nirvana was the ultimate and final state attained when the supramundane yogic path had been completed. It represented salvation from samsara precisely because it was understood to comprise a state of complete freedom from the chain of samsaric causes and conditions, i.e., precisely because it was unconditioned (asamskrta)."; Walpola Rahula: "Let us consider a few definitions and descriptions of Nirvana as found in the original Pali texts [...] 'It is the complete cessation of that very thirst (tanha), giving it up, renouncing it, emancipation from it, detachment from it.' [...] 'The abandoning and destruction of craving for these Five Aggregates of Attachment: that is the cessation of dukkha. [...] 'The Cessation of Continuity and becoming (Bhavanirodha) is Nibbana.'") It is part of the Four Noble Truths doctrine of Buddhism, which plays an essential role in Theravada Buddhism. Nirvana has been described in Buddhist texts in a manner similar to other Indian religions, as the state of complete liberation, nirvana, highest happiness, bliss, fearless, freedom, dukkha-less, permanence, non-dependent origination, unfathomable, indescribable. It has also been described as a state of release marked by "emptiness" and realization of non-Self. Such descriptions, states Peter Harvey, are contested by scholars because nirvana in Buddhism is ultimately described as a state of "stopped consciousness (blown out), but one that is not non-existent", and "it seems impossible to imagine what awareness devoid of any object would be like".

== Jainism ==
In Jainism, moksha and nirvana are synonymous. Jaina texts sometimes use the term Kevalya, and call the liberated soul as Kevalin. As with all Indian religions, moksha is the ultimate spiritual goal in Jainism. It defines moksha as the spiritual release from all karma.

Jainism is a Sramanic non-theistic philosophy that believes in a metaphysical permanent self or soul often termed jiva. Jaina believe that this soul is what transmigrates from one being to another at the time of death. The moksa state is attained when a soul (atman) is liberated from the cycles of deaths and rebirths (saṃsāra), is at the apex, is omniscient, remains there eternally, and is known as a siddha. In Jainism, it is believed to be a stage beyond ethical perfection, states Paul Dundas, because they can perform physical and mental activities such as teach, without accruing karma that leads to rebirth.

Jaina traditions believe that there exist Abhavya (incapable), or a class of souls that can never attain moksha (liberation). The Abhavya state of soul is entered after an intentional and shockingly evil act, but Jaina texts also polemically applied Abhavya condition to those who belonged to a competing ancient Indian tradition called Ājīvika. A male human being is considered closest to the apex of moksha, with the potential to achieve liberation, particularly through asceticism. The ability of women to attain moksha has been historically debated, and the subtraditions with Jainism have disagreed. In the Digambara tradition of Jainism, women must live an ethical life and gain karmic merit to be reborn as a man, because only males can achieve spiritual liberation. In contrast, the Śvētāmbara tradition has believed that women too can attain moksha just like men.

According to Jainism, purification of soul and liberation can be achieved through the path of three jewels: Samyak darśana (Correct View), meaning faith, acceptance of the truth of soul (jīva); Samyak jnana (Correct Knowledge), meaning undoubting knowledge of the tattvas; and Samyak charitra (Correct Conduct), meaning behavior consistent with the Five vows. Jain texts often add samyak tap (Correct Asceticism) as a fourth jewel, emphasizing belief in ascetic practices as the means to liberation (moksha). The four jewels are called moksha marg. According to Jain texts, the liberated pure soul (Siddha) goes up to the summit of universe (Siddhashila) and dwells there in eternal bliss.

== Sikhism ==
The concept of mukti (Gurmukhi: ਮੁਕਤੀ) exists in Sikhism and refers to spiritual liberation. Most scholars describe the Sikh concept of mukti as the state that breaks the cycle of rebirths, though in practice, several verses exist that cast doubt on the reincarnation cycle. Mukti is obtained gurprasadi or "by God's grace", states Singha.

I do not seek power, and I do not seek liberation. My mind is in love with Your Lotus Feet.
Brahma, Shiva, the Siddhas, the silent sages and Indra - I seek only the Blessed Vision of my Lord and Master’s Darshan.
I have come, helpless, to Your Door, O Lord Master; I am exhausted – I seek the Sanctuary of the Saints.
Says Nanak, I have met my Enticing Lord God; my mind is cooled and soothed – it blossoms forth in joy.

— Guru Granth Sahib, P534

Singha believes that Sikhism recommends Naam Simran as the way to mukti, which is meditating and contemplating the Naam, but other ways exist.

== See also ==
- Henosis
- Sallekhana
