= Uvaṭa =

Uvaṭa was a commentator of the Vedas. He wrote commentaries of the prātiśākhyas, notably on the Rigveda-pratishakhya of Shaunaka.

According to Bhimasena's Sudhasagara-tika, he was a brother of Kaiyata, the author of Mahabhaṣyapradipa, and of Rajanka Mammata, and lived at the court of Bhoja, in the mid eleventh century.

== See also ==
- Sayana
- Mahidhara
