= Mahīdhara =

Indian scholar

Mahīdhara ("earth-bearing") was a 16th-century commentator on the Vedas. His treatises include the Mantramahodadhi ("great ocean of mantras"), written around 1588, and the Vedadipa (veda-dīpa, "light of the Vedas"). The latter focuses on the Vajasaneyi-samhita of the White Yajurveda.

Mahīdhara's name is associated with a legendary mountain described in the Mahabharata, which is also an epithet of Vishnu.

Mahīdhara's commentaries belong to a period later than that of Yaska.

== Editions ==
- Mantramahodadhi with the Commentary Nauka, Sri Satguru Publications, Indian Books Centre, Delhi (1984, 1985), ISBN 978-81-7030-050-2.
- Mahidhara's Mantra mahodadhih: Text in Sanskrit and roman along with English translation and comprehensive commentary, Prachya Prakashan (1992)
- Isavasyopanisad bhasya sangraha: Sankara bhasyam, Uvata bhasyam, Sayana bhasyam, Mahidhara bhasyam, Prakasa bhasyam, Yogapaksiyam Pra. Bha., Svami Dayananda, Jagadisa Samskrta Pustakalaya; Nutana samskarana edition (2001), ISBN 978-81-87177-21-0
- A. Weber, The Vajasaneyi-samhita in the Madhyandina- and the Kanva-shakha Berlin (1852), reprint Chowkhamba (1972).

== See also ==
- Sayana
- Uvata
- Yaska
