= Kleshas =

Kleshas may refer to:

- Kleshas (Hinduism), spiritual afflictions in Hinduism
- Kleshas (Buddhism), negative mental states in Buddhism
