= Kali the Mother =

Kali the Mother may refer to:

- Kali the Mother (book), a book written by Sister Nivedita
- Kali the Mother (poem), a poem written by Swami Vivekananda
