= Kali the Mother (poem) =

Poem by Swami Vivekananda dedicated to Hindu goddess Kali

- by Swami Vivekananda
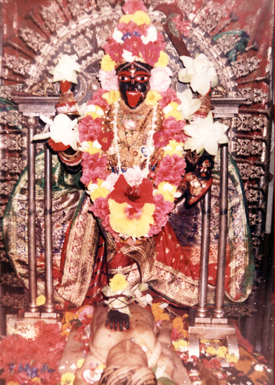
- Vivekananda worshipped the different form of goddess Kali in this poem.
- First published in: December 1898
- Country: India
- Language: English

"Kali the Mother" is a poem written by Hindu monk Swami Vivekananda. Vivekananda wrote the poem on 24 September 1898 when he was staying in Kashmir, on a houseboat, on Dal Lake in Srinagar. In this poem he worshipped goddess Kali.

== Background ==
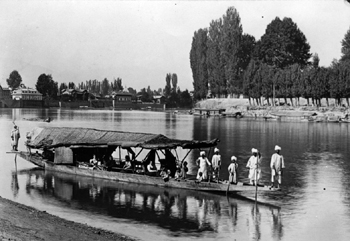
Swami Vivekananda in a houseboat in Kashmir in 1898

Vivekananda began turning towards the Hindu goddess Kali during the summer of 1886, a few months after the death of his guru, the mystic Ramakrishna. Later, he became a worshipper of Kali, which he felt was his "special fad". In 1893 Vivekananda went to America to represent India and Hinduism in the Parliament of the World's Religions. From 1893 to 1897, he travelled through America and England, and gave a series of lecture on religion and Hinduism. He came back to India in 1897 and travelled extensively there between 1897 and 1899, visiting many states. In 1898, he went to Kashmir, where he stayed at a houseboat on Dal Lake. After visiting the Kheer Bhawani temple (a temple near Srinagar that has Bhawani as the deity), Vivekananda wrote this poem. Sister Nivedita, who was accompanying Vivekananda in Kashmir, noted that he was in a "fever of inspiration" prior to writing the poem, and became impatient until he could write down his thought.

== Poem ==
Kali the Mother (excerpt)

The stars are blotted out,
The clouds are covering clouds,
It is darkness vibrant, sonant.
In the roaring, whirling wind
Are the souls of a million lunatics
Just loose from the prison-house,
Wrenching trees by the roots,
Sweeping all from the path...
The sea has joined the fray,
And swirls up mountain-waves,
To reach the pitchy sky.
The flash of lurid light
Reveals on every side
A thousand, thousand shades
Of Death begrimed and black —

- Read the full poem at Wikisource

== Theme ==
The poem glorifies the goddess Kali, whom Hindus associate with empowerment. In this poem, Vivekananda is worshiping the terrible form of the goddess (Kali is portrayed mostly in two forms: the popular four-armed form and the ten-armed Mahakali form, the "terrible" form). In the poem, he shows how the whole universe is a stage for the goddess's terrible and frenzied dance.

== Influence ==
This poem influenced Indian freedom fighters Subhas Chandra Bose and Sri Aurobindo. Sri Aurobindo used it as a basis for his Bhawani Mandir manifesto. He said about the poem:

The Shakti we call India. Bhawani Bharati is the living unity of the Shaktis of three hundred million people; but she is inactive, imprisoned in the magic circle of Tamas, the self-indulgent inertia and ignorance of her sons. Strength can only be created by drawing it from the eternal and inexhaustible reservoirs of the spirit, from the Adya-Shakti of the Eternal which is the fountain of all new existence.

Sarvepalli Radhakrishnan said that the poem gives "articulation and voice to that eternal spirit of India".

== See also ==
- Khandana Bhava–Bandhana
