= Select essays of Sister Nivedita =

1911 book by Sister Nivedita

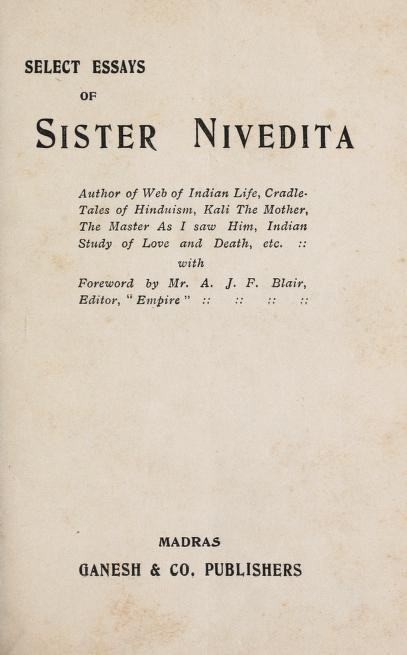
- Select essays of Sister Nivedita 1911 title page
- Author: Sister Nivedita
- Language: English
- Genre: Essays
- Publisher: Ganesh & Co.
- Publication place: India
- English publication date: 1911

Select Essays of Sister Nivedita (1911) is an English-language book written by Sister Nivedita, a disciple of Swami Vivekananda. The foreword of the book was written by A. J. F. Blair.

== Theme ==
In this book Nivedita has written essays dealing with India, Indian culture, religion, society, history, politics, etc. She also presented her views on the condition of Indian women of that time, Swadesi movement etc. After discussing different problems that India and Hinduism faced at that time Nivedita gave her own ideas to revive and reform as well. The appendix section of book contains some tributes to Sister Nivedita.
