= Religion and Dharma =

1915 book by Sister Nivedita

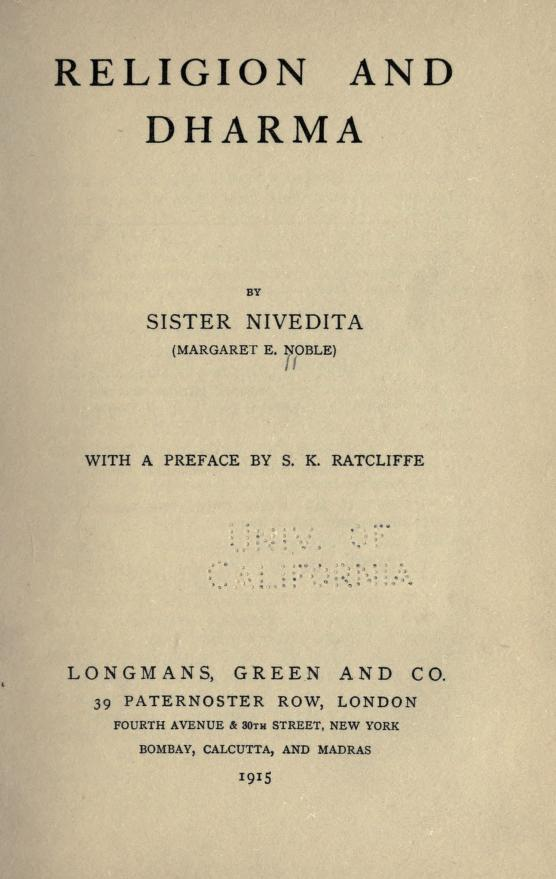
- Title page of Religion and Dharma, 1915 edition
- Author: Sister Nivedita
- Language: English
- Genre: Essays
- Publisher: Longmans, Green, and Co.
- English publication date: 1915

Religion and Dharma (1915) is a book written by Sister Nivedita. In this book Nivedita has discussed on the common principles of individual and social growth according to the law of Dharma.

== Theme ==
Nivedita travelled to India in 1898. She was closely in touch with student community of India, especially Bengal. Generally Indian word Dharma is translated to English as Religion, but, in this book author has these two are different and how Dharma has a larger and more complex significance. This book is a collection of essays. In this book author has discussed on several aspects on Hinduism like Hindu Rituals, Mukti, "Hinduism and Organization", sectarianism, renunciation, religion and national success etc.
