= An Indian Study of Love and Death =

1908 book by Sister Nivedita

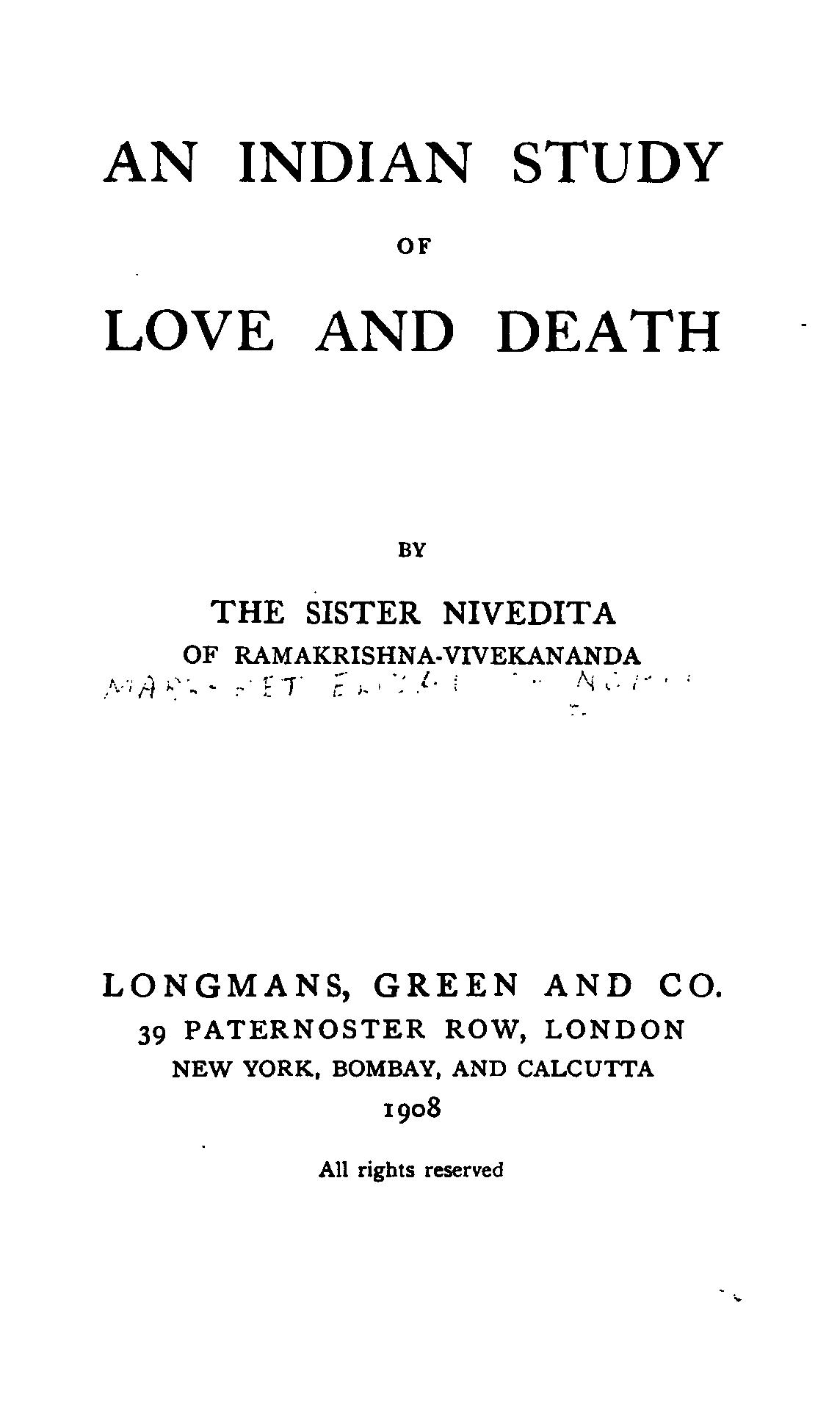
- Title page of 1908 edition of the book
- Author: Sister Nivedita
- Language: English
- Publisher: Longmans, Green & Co.
- English publication date: 1908

An Indian Study of Love and Death (1908) is a book written by Sister Nivedita.

== Background ==
Nivedita travelled to India in 1898. Josephine MacLeod, a friend and devotee of Swami Vivekananda asked him how best she could help him and got the reply to "Love India". Nivedita wrote multiple books on Indian history, culture, tradition etc. This book An Indian Study of Love and Death was one of those books.

The author has divided the book in several chapters. In the first few chapters she has meditated (section "Meditation") on "The soul", "The love", "Inner perfection, "Peace", "Inner perfection". Later the book deals with the communion of the soul with the beloved. And finally it discusses on some rites Hindus observe to honour a dead person.
