= Notes of Some Wanderings with the Swami Vivekananda =

1913 book by Sister Nivedita

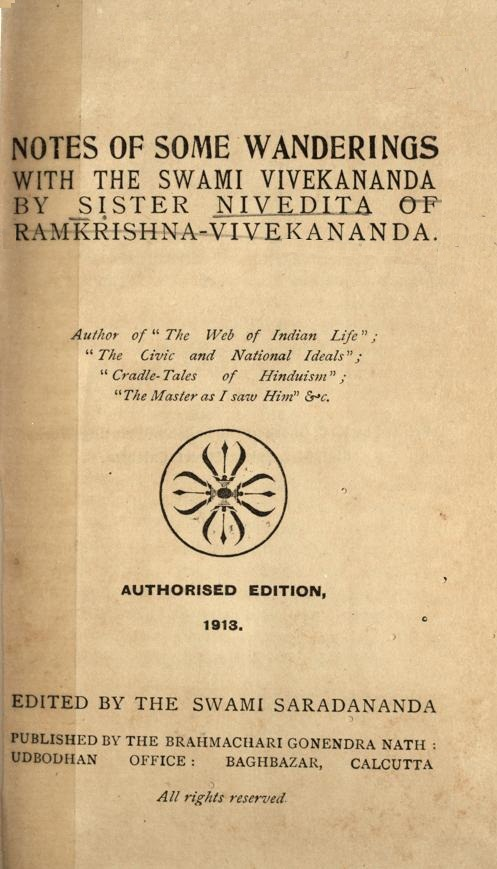
- Notes of Some Wanderings with the Swami Vivekananda 1913 title page
- Author: Sister Nivedita
- Language: English
- Genre: Essays, Travelogue
- Publisher: Udbodhan, Calcutta
- Publication place: India
- English publication date: 1913

Notes of Some Wanderings with the Swami Vivekananda (1913) is an English-language book written by Sister Nivedita. In this book Nivedita has narrated the experiences she had while traveling with Swami Vivekananda in different parts of India.

== Background ==
Nivedita travelled to India in 1898. Josephine MacLeod, a friend and devotee of Swami Vivekananda, asked him how best she could help him and got the reply to "Love India". In India Nivedita travelled a lot of places in India, including Kashmir, with Swami Vivekananda. In May 1898, she accompanied Swami Vivekananda to the visit of Himalaya including Nainital and Almora.

In this book, Sister Nivedita has narrated the experiences she had while traveling with Swami Vivekananda in different parts of India.

== Chapters ==
- Foreword
- Chapter I: The Home on the Ganges
- Chapter II: At Naini Tal and Almora
- Chapter III: Morning Talks at Almora
- Chapter IV: On the way to Kathgodam
- Chapter V: On the way to Baramulla
- Chapter VI: The Vale of Kashmir
- Chapter VII: Life at Srinagar
- Chapter VIII: The Temple of Pandrenthan
- Chapter IX: Walks and Talks beside the Jhellum
- Chapter X: The Shrine of Amarnath
- Chapter XI: At Srinagar on the Return Journey
- Chapter XII: The Camp Under The Chennaard
- Concluding words from the editors
