= Cradle Tales of Hinduism =

1907 book by Sister Nivedita

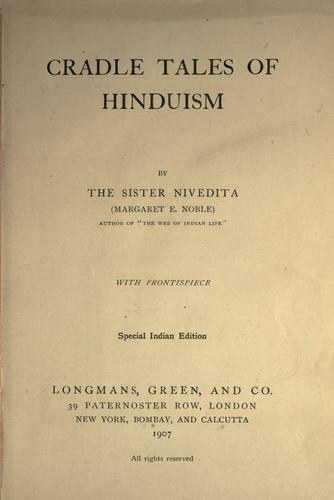
- Title page
- Author: Sister Nivedita
- Language: English
- Publisher: Longmans
- English publication date: 1907
- Pages: 332 pages (paperback)
- ISBN: 81-85301-93-X

Cradle Tales of Hinduism (1907) is a collection of stories by Sister Nivedita. It is an introduction to Hindu mythology; the stories come from the Mahabharata, the Ramayana and other Hindu sources and are presented as they were told in Indian nurseries.

== Background ==
Nivedita travelled to India in 1898. Josephine MacLeod, a friend and devotee of Swami Vivekananda asked him how best she could help him and got the reply to "Love India". Nivedita wanted to interpret Indian culture to the Western world and so wrote this book.

== Stories ==
Stories include:

- Story of Shiva
- Story of (Brahma)
- Story of Rama
- Story of the great snake
- Story of Prahlada
- Story of Dhruva etc.
- Story of Sati
- Story of Nala and Damayanti
- Throne of Vikramaditya
