= Asit Kumar Haldar =

Indian painter of Bengal school (1890–1964)

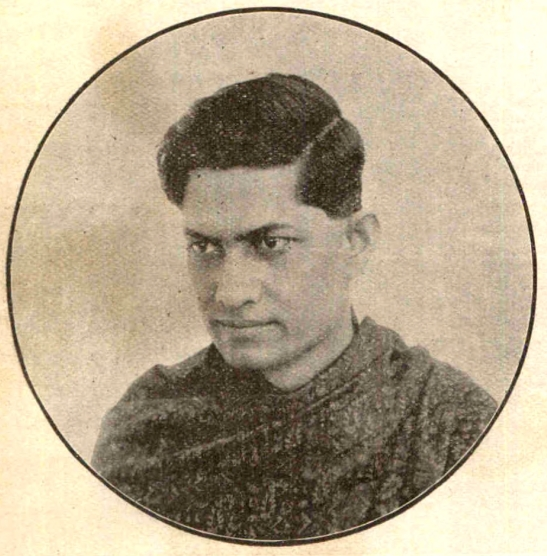
- Born: 10 September 1890; Jorasanko, Calcutta, Bengal Presidency, British India
- Died: 13 February 1964 (aged 73); Calcutta, West Bengal, India
- Known for: Painting
- Movement: Bengal School of Art

Asit Kumar Haldar (10 September 1890 – 13 February 1964) was an Indian painter of Bengal school and an assistant of Rabindranath Tagore at Shantiniketan. He was one of the major artists of the Bengal Renaissance.

== Early life ==
Haldar was born in Jorasanko in 1890. His maternal grandmother was the sister of Rabindranath Tagore, making him Tagore's grandnephew. Both his grandfather Rakhaldas Haldar and his father Sukumar Haldar were accomplished in the art of painting. He began his studies at the age of 14. His education was undertaken at Government School of Art, Calcutta and began in 1904. Haldar learned sculpting from two famous Bengali artists in 1905 – Jadu Pal and Bakkeswar Pal, and he also learned from Leonard Jennings.

== Career ==
From 1909 to 1911 he was in the Ajanta documenting the paintings on the frescoes. He did this on an expedition with Lady Herringham, and in conjunction with two other Bengali painters, the object of which was to bring cave art to a wider Indian audience. In 1921, he undertook another expedition, this time to the Bagh Caves and his reflections on the art there indicate quite a few surrealistic depictions.

From 1911 to 1915 he was an art teacher at Shantiniketan. He was also the principal of the Kala Bhavan school from 1911 to 1923, assisting Tagore with cultural and artistic activities. During this time, he introduced many different styles to art to the students, and revolutionized decorative and ceremonial displays there.

In 1923, he went on a study tour through England, France and Germany. On his return, he became Principal of the Maharaja’s School of Arts and Crafts, Jaipur where he remained for a year, before moving to the Government School of Arts and Crafts in Lucknow in the year 1925 as principal and worked till 1945.

== Work ==
=== Art ===
Haldar made a tour of Europe in 1923 and soon realized that Realism in European art had numerous limitations. He sought to balance physical attributes in proportion to the magnitude of the subject matter. Haldar's Yashoda and Krisna was not just a religious painting but an artistic juxtaposition of the infinite (represented by Krishna with the finite (represented by Yashoda). Haldar also made thirty two paintings on the Buddha's life and thirty paintings on Indian history, attempting to embrace idealism in his art. His media included: lacquer, tempera, oil, watercolors, and even ranged to some photography. He created more paintings on epos, legends and also on the stately events of Indian history. Asit Kumar Haldar was highly regarded for his experimentation with different techniques, styles and mediums. His repertoire spanned across a variety of themes urging Abanindranath Tagore to comment on his student: ‘… Asit seems to have no limitations.’ Though known for his mythological subjects, Haldar’s artistic journey soaked in other influences, including cubism, of which The Man is a prime example. Clean, bold lines in this work show Haldar’s proclivity to be a curious, experimental artist

Dhruva, Painting, published in Myths of the Hindus & Buddhists (1914).

His masterpieces include:

- Krsna and Yashoda
- Awakening of Mother India
- Rai-Raja Lotus
- Kunala and Ashoka
- Raslila
- The Flame of Music
- Pronam

=== Poetry ===
Haldar was a budding poet throughout his life. He translated Kalidasa's Meghadoota ("Cloud messenger") and Ritusamhara (Cycle of the seasons) into Bengali from Sanskrit. He also illustrated numerous poems in visual art, including twelve from Omar Khayyam. His art on the Buddha and the History of India fell under this poetic umbrella. He is also the author of various books in Bengali, viz. Ajanta (A travelogue to the Caves of Ajanta), Ho-der Galpo (The life and culture of the Ho tribe), Bagh Guha and Ramgarh (Another travelogue to the Bagh Cave and Ramgarh in Central India, etc. A newly annotated edition of Ajanta has recently been published by Lalmati, Kolkata, with annotations, additions and photographs by Prasenjit Dasgupta and Soumen Paul. A newly annotated edition of Bagguha and Ramgarh written by Asit Kumar Halder has been published by New Age Publishers, Kolkata, with annotations, additions and photographs by Prasenjit Dasgupta and Soumen Paul.

== Tributes ==
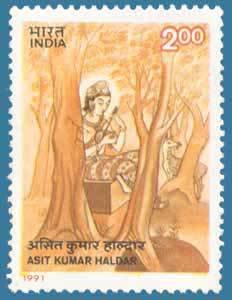
Stamp of India – 1991 – Colnect 164218 – Sidhatrtha with an Injured Bird – by Haldar

Haldar was the first Indian to be appointed as the principal of a Government Art School. He was also the first Indian to be elected a Fellow of the Royal Society of Arts, London in 1934. The Allahabad Museum opened a large "Haldar Hall" with many of his works in 1938.

He was the mentor of eminent artist Prof. Sukhvir Sanghal, who studied under him and later served as the principal of the Lucknow School of Arts and Crafts in Lucknow.
