= Footfalls of Indian History =

1915 book by Sister Nivedita

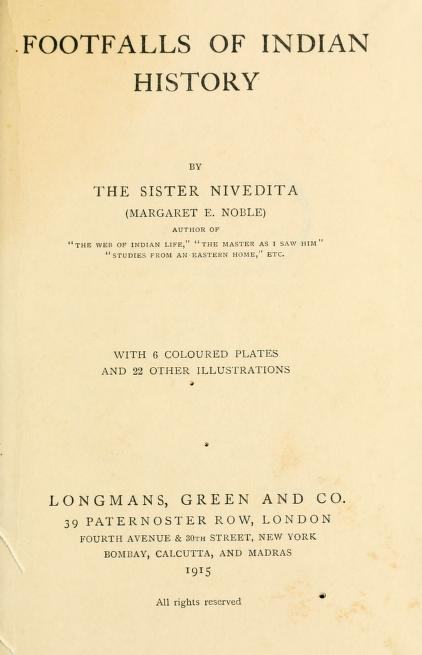
- Author: Sister Nivedita
- Publisher: Green, and Co
- English publication date: 1915

Footfalls of Indian History (1915) is a book written by Sister Nivedita. Nivedita dedicated her life for the service of India. In the book the author has discussed on several chapters of Indian history about its glory and drawbacks. The most important topics of Indian history like religions of India, Indian philosophy, Indian culture, and Indian architecture have been discussed in the book. Nivedita not only discussed some problems in India, she also suggested ways to solve some of those problems.
