= Sister Nivedita =

Irish social activist and disciple of Swami Vivekananda

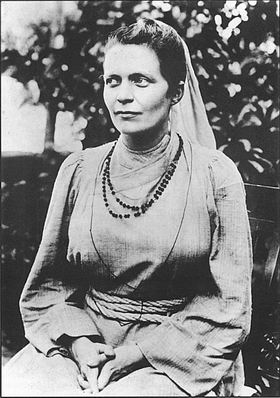
- Sister Nivedita in India

Personal life
- Born: Margaret Elizabeth Noble; 28 October 1867 Dungannon, County Tyrone, Ireland, United Kingdom of Great Britain and Ireland
- Died: 13 October 1911 (aged 43) Darjeeling, Bengal Presidency, British India
- Region: Indian philosophy
- Notable work(s): Kali the Mother, The Web of Indian Life, Cradle Tales of Hinduism, An Indian Study of Love and Death, The Master as I Saw Him, Notes of some wanderings with the Swami Vivekananda, Select essays of Sister Nivedita, Studies from an Eastern Home, Myths of the Hindus & Buddhists, Footfalls of Indian History, Religion and Dharma

Religious life
- Religion: Hinduism (at death); Methodist (at birth)
- Founder of: Ramakrishna Sarada Mission Sister Nivedita Girls' School
- Philosophy: Advaita Vedanta

Senior posting
- Teacher: Swami Vivekananda
- Influenced by: Buddha; Pestalozzi; Fröbel; Ramakrishna; Devi; Vivekananda
- Influenced: Havell; Tagore; Coomaraswamy; Bose; Haldar; Bharati

Sister Nivedita (Bengali pronunciation: [bhagini nibedita]; née Margaret Elizabeth Noble; 28 October 1867 – 13 October 1911) was an Irish–Indian philosopher, educator, writer, social activist and disciple of Swami Vivekananda.

Sister Nivedita met Swami Vivekananda in 1895 in London and travelled to Calcutta (present-day Kolkata), India, in 1898. Swami Vivekananda gave her the name Nivedita (meaning "Dedicated to God") when he initiated her into the vow of Brahmacharya on 25 March 1898. In November 1898, she opened a girls' school in the Bagbazar area of North Calcutta. She wanted to educate girls who were deprived of even basic education. During the plague epidemic in Calcutta in 1899, Nivedita nursed and took care of the poor patients.

Nivedita had close associations with the newly established Ramakrishna Mission. Because of her active contribution in the field of Indian nationalism, she had to publicly dissociate herself from the activities of the Ramakrishna Mission under the then president, Swami Brahmananda. This had to be done in order to avoid their persecution at the hands of British authorities in India. She was very close to Sarada Devi, the wife of Ramakrishna and one of the major influences behind Ramakrishna Mission, and also with all brother disciples of Swami Vivekananda. She died on 13 October 1911 in Darjeeling. Her epitaph reads, "Here lies Sister Nivedita who gave her all to India."

== Early life ==
Margaret Elizabeth Noble was born on 28 October 1867 (Note: Also cited as 1866) in Dungannon, County Tyrone to Samuel Richmond Noble, a linen draper, and Mary Isabel Noble (née Hamilton). Named for her paternal grandmother, both of Nivedita's grandfathers actively supported home-rule. Nivedita was the eldest of six siblings, of which 3 died in infancy.

Nivedita's father later become a Methodist minister, and when Nivedita was four years old the family moved to Oldham before settling in Great Torrington. Upon her father's death in 1877, the family returned to Ireland whilst Nivedita remained in Halifax and studied at The Crossley Orphan Home and School.

At the age of seventeen in 1884, she first started a career in teaching at a school in Keswick. In 1886, she went to Rugby to teach in an orphanage. A year later, she took up a post at the coal-mining area of Wrexham in North Wales. Here, she revived her spirit of service and love for the poor, which she had inherited from her father. At Wrexham, Margaret became engaged to be married to a Welsh youth, who died soon after the engagement. In 1889, Margaret moved to Chester. By this time, her sister May and brother Richmond were living in Liverpool. Soon, their mother Mary joined them. Margaret was happy to be reunited with her family. Occasionally, she went to Liverpool to stay with them.

Margaret resumed her studies in the field of education. She became acquainted with the ideas of the Swiss education reformer Johann Heinrich Pestalozzi and with the German Friedrich Fröbel. Both Pestalozzi and Froebel emphasised the importance of preschool education. They opined that education should begin by gratifying and cultivating the normal aptitude of the child for exercise, play, observation, imitation, and construction. A group of teachers in England was attracted to this novel method of teaching, and they tried to put it into practice. Thus, the 'New Education' was advocated and Margaret, too, became a part of it. Soon, she became a favourite writer and speaker at the Sunday Club and the Liverpool Science Club.

In 1891, Margaret settled in Wimbledon and helped, a Mrs. de Leeuw, to start a new school in London. The new experiment in teaching gave her great joy. After a year, in 1892, Margaret started her own independent school at Kingsleygate. At her school, there were no restrictive set methods and formal learning. Children learned through play. At this time, Margaret learned to be a critic of art from one of her staff teachers, Ebenezer Cooke, a well-known art master and reformer of art education.

As she gained mastery as an educator, she also became a prolific writer in paper and periodicals and a popular speaker. Soon she became a name among the intellectuals of London and became acquainted with some of the most learned and influential people of her time. Among them were Lady Ripon and Lady Isabel Margesson. They were the founders of a literary coterie, which came to be known as the Sesame Club. The Times of London of 26 October 1911, wrote about Margaret, "A trained teacher of exceptional gifts, she was one of a group of educationists who in the early nineties founded the Sesame Club." Famous writers, such as W.B. Yeats, Bernard Shaw and Thomas Huxley, were some of the regular speakers at the Sesame Club. Discussions were held here on literature, ethics, politics, and other similar subjects.

In 1892, when the Home Rule Bill for Ireland was before the Parliament, Margaret spoke fearlessly in favor of it.

== Seeker of Truth ==
Coming from a religious background, Margaret had learned Christian religious doctrines from a young age. From childhood, she had learned to venerate all religious teachings. The infant Jesus was her object of adoration and worship. However, as she bloomed into womanhood, doubt in the Christian doctrines crept in. She found the teachings were incompatible with Truth. As these doubts became stronger, her faith in Christianity was shaken. For seven long years, Margaret was unable to settle her mind, and this led to unhappiness. She tried to absorb herself in church service. However, her troubled soul could not find satisfaction, and she longed for Truth.

Search for truth made Margaret take up the study of natural science. Later, in a lecture delivered at the Hindu Ladies' Social Club in Bombay in 1902, she said:

During the seven years of wavering it occurred to me that in the study of natural science I should surely find the Truth I was seeking. So I began ardently to study how this world was created and all things in it and I discovered that in the laws of Nature at least there was consistency, but it made the doctrines of the Christian religion seem all the more inconsistent. Just then I happened to get a life of Buddha and in it I found that here also was a child who lived ever so many centuries before the Child Christ, but whose sacrifices were no less self-abnegating than those of the other. This dear child Gautama took a strong hold on me and for the next three years I plunged into the study of the religion of Buddha, and became more and more convinced that the salvation he preached was decidedly more consistent with the Truth than the preachings of the Christian religion.

== Meeting with Swami Vivekananda ==
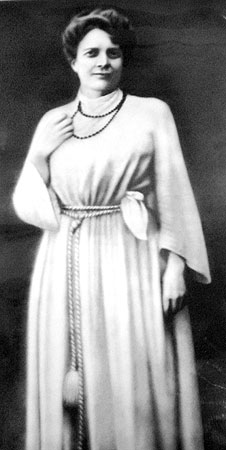
Sister Nivedita

In November 1895, she met Swami Vivekananda for the first time, who had come from America to visit London and stayed there for three months. On a cold afternoon, Swami Vivekananda was explaining Vedanta philosophy in the drawing room of an aristocratic family at 63 St George's Road, London. Lady Isabel Margesson, a friend of Margaret, invited Ebenezer Cooke, who was part of the teaching staff at Margaret's 'Ruskin School', to this meeting. Margaret went with him, with much curiosity and interest. Margaret did not know this evening would change her life completely. Margaret described her experience of the occasion. "A majestic personage, clad in a saffron gown and wearing a red waistband, sat there on the floor, cross-legged. As he spoke to the company, he recited Sanskrit verses in his deep, sonorous voice." Margaret had already delved deeply into the teachings of the East, and the novelty was not what she heard on this occasion, but the personality of Swamiji himself. She attended several other lectures by Swami Vivekananda. She asked a lot of questions, and his answers dispelled her doubts and established her faith and reverence for the speaker.

Nivedita wrote in 1904 to a friend about her decision to follow Swami Vivekananda as a result of her meeting him in England in November 1895:

Suppose he had not come to London that time! Life would have been a headless dream, for I always knew that I was waiting for something. I always said that a call would come. And it did. But if I had known more of life, I doubt whether, when the time came, I should certainly have recognized it.

Fortunately, I knew little and was spared that torture ... Always I had this burning voice within, but nothing to utter. How often and often I sat down, pen in hand, to speak, and there was no speech! And now there is no end to it! As surely I am fitted to my world, so surely is my world in need of me, waiting – ready. The arrow has found its place in the bow. But if he had not come! If he had meditated, on the Himalayan peaks! ... I, for one, had never been here.

She started taking interest in the teachings of Gautama Buddha, and her discussions with Swami Vivekananda were an alternate source of peace and benediction. She wrote:

To not a few of us, the words of Swami Vivekananda came as living water to men perishing of thirst. Many of us had been conscious for years past of that growing uncertainty and despair with regard to Religion, which has beset the intellectual life of Europe for half a century. Belief in the dogmas of Christianity had become impossible to us, and we had no means, such as we now hold, by which to separate the doctrinal shell from the kernel of reality in our faith. To these the Vedanta has given intellectual confirmation and philosophical expression of their own mistrusted intuitions.

Vivekananda's principles and teachings influenced Nivedita. Impressed by her passion and seeing potential in her, on 25 March 1898, Vivekananda dedicated her to God and to the service of India.

Vivekananda had toured the Indian subcontinent extensively, acquiring first-hand knowledge of the conditions prevailing in British India. In his opinion, education was the panacea for all evils plaguing contemporary Indian society, especially that of Indian women. Margaret was chosen for the role of educating Indian women. In his letter to Margaret, Vivekananda wrote, "Let me tell you frankly that I am now convinced that you have a great future in the work for India. What was wanted was not a man but a woman, a real lioness, to work for the Indians, women especially."

== Travel to India ==
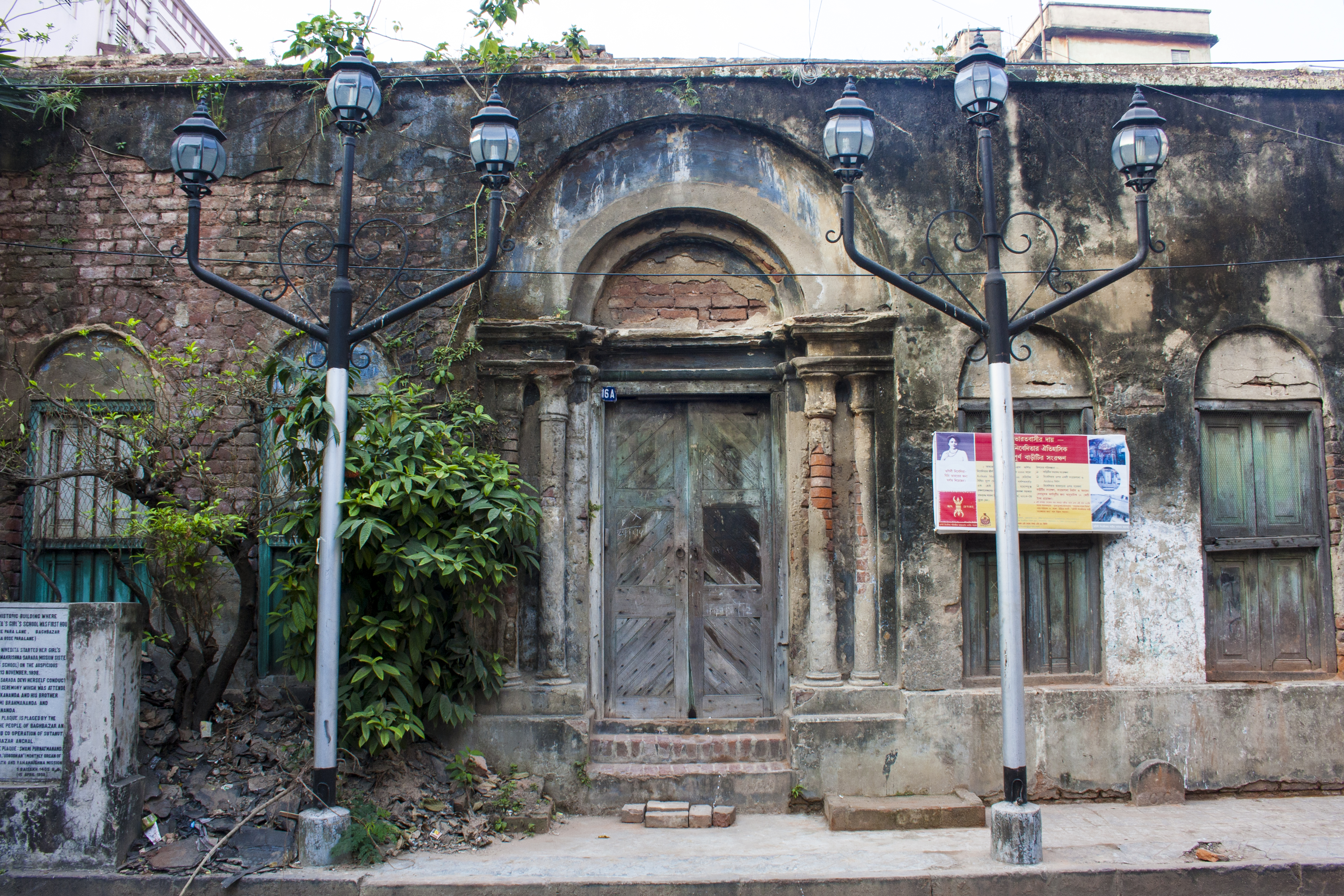
House of Sister Nivedita in Bagbazar, Kolkata (Old)

Responding to Swami Vivekananda's call, Margaret travelled to India, leaving behind her friends and family, including her mother. Mombasa, the ship bringing Margaret to India, reached Calcutta on 28 January 1898. On 22 February, Margaret visited Dakshineshwar temple, the place where Ramakrishna did his sadhana. Swami Vivekananda devoted the initial few days in teaching her about India and its people, and helping her develop the love for the people; he was broadening her character. He explained India's history, philosophy, literature, the life of the common mass, social traditions, and also the lives of great personalities, both ancient and modern, to her. A few weeks later, two of Swami Vivekananda's women disciples in America, Sara C. Bull, wife of famous Norwegian violinist and composer Ole Bull and Josephine MacLeod arrived in India. The three became lifelong friends. On 11 March 1898, Swami Vivekananda organised a public meeting at Star Theatre to introduce Sister Nivedita to the people of Calcutta. In his speech, Swami Vivekananda said, "England has sent us another gift in Miss Margaret Noble." In this meeting, Margaret expressed her desire to serve India and its people. On 17 March she met Sarada Devi who greeted Margaret affectionately as Khooki (i.e. little girl).

=== Brahmacharya ===
On 25 March 1898, at Nilambar Mukherjee Garden, Swami Vivekananda formally initiated Margaret in the vow of Brahmacharya (lifelong celibacy) and gave her the name of "Nivedita", the dedicated one. Swami Vivekananda said to her, "Go thou and follow Him, Who was born and gave His life for others five hundred times before He attained the vision of the Buddha."

Though Sister Nivedita expressed her desire to take the ultimate vow of Sannyasa, Swami Vivekananda did not approve of it. Later, after the demise of Swami Vivekananda, on 28 July 1902, Nivedita wrote to the Editor of the Statesman the following letter:

... My own position towards this religious treasure is that of the humblest learner, merely a Brahmacharini, or novice, not a Sannyasini or fully professed religious, without any pretentions to Sanskrit learning, and set free by the great kindness of my superiors to pursue my social, literary and educational work and studies, entirely outside their direction and supervision.

Swami Vivekananda was anxious to mold Nivedita as a Hindu Brahmacharini. He wanted her to be a Hindu in thoughts and actions. He encouraged her to visit Hindu ladies to observe their way of life. He told her:

You have to set yourself to Hinduize your thoughts, your needs, your conceptions and your habits. Your life, internal and external, has to become all that an orthodox Brahmana Brahmacharini's ought to be. The method will come to you, if only you desire it sufficiently. But you have to forget your own past and to cause it to be forgotten. You have to lose even its memory.

== Relationship with Sarada Devi ==
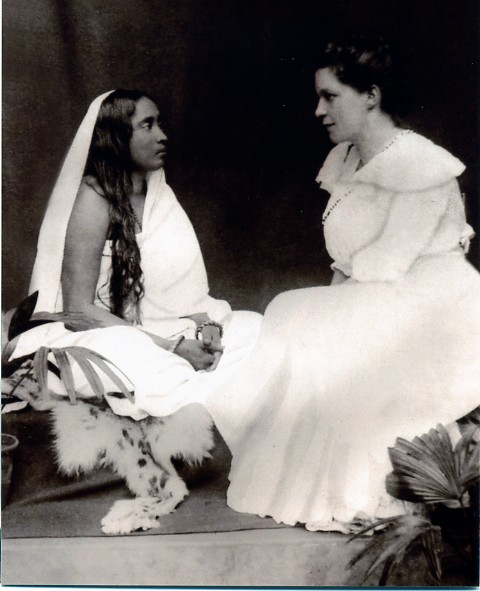
Sarada Devi (left) and Sister Nivedita

Within a few days of her arrival in India, on 17 March 1898, Margaret met Sarada Devi, wife and spiritual consort of Ramakrishna, who, surpassing all language and cultural barriers, embraced her as "khooki" or "little girl" in Bengali. It was St. Patrick's Day, a very holy and special day in Margaret's life, and Nivedita recounted it as her "day of days." Until her death in 1911, Nivedita remained one of the closest associates of Sarada Devi. On 13 November 1898, the Holy Mother Sarada Devi came to open Nivedita's newly founded school. After worshiping Ramakrishna, she consecrated the school and blessed it, saying: ‘I pray that the blessings of the Divine Mother may be upon the school and the girls; and the girls trained from the school may become ideal girls.' Nivedita was delighted and recorded her feelings later as "I cannot imagine a grander omen than her blessings, spoken over the educated Hindu womanhood of the future." The first photograph of Sarada Devi was taken at Nivedita's house. Nivedita wrote in a letter to her friend Nell Hammond about Sarada Devi after her first few meetings with her, "She really is, under the simplest, most unassuming guise, one of the strongest and greatest of women." An excerpt is provided here from the Gospel of Holy Mother, where Sarada Devi's impressions about Nivedita are captured vividly:

Referring to Nivedita, she [Sarada Devi] said, "What sincere devotion Nivedita had! She never considered anything too much that she might do for me. She would often come to see me at night. Once seeing that light struck my eyes, she put a shade of paper on the lamp. She would prostrate herself before me and, with great tenderness, take the dust off my feet with her handkerchief. I felt that she not even hesitated to touch my feet." The thought of Nivedita opened the floodgate of her mind and she suddenly became grave... The Mother now and then expressed her feelings towards the Sister. She said at last, "The inner soul feels for a sincere devotee."

== Travels ==
Nivedita travelled to many places in India, including Kashmir, with Swami Vivekananda, Josephine MacLeod, and Sara Bull. This helped her in connecting to the Indian masses, Indian culture, and its history. She also went to the United States to raise awareness and get help for her cause. On 11 May 1898, she went with Swami Vivekananda, Sara Bull, Josephine MacLeod, and Swami Turiyananda, on a journey to the Himalayas. From Nainital, they travelled to Almora. On 5 June 1898, she wrote a letter to her friend Nell Hammond exclaiming, "Oh Nell, Nell, India is indeed the Holy Land." In Almora, she first learned the art of meditation. She wrote about this experience, "A mind must be brought to change its centre of gravity... again the open and disinterested state of mind welcomes truth." She also started learning Bengali from Swami Swarupananda. From Almora, they went to Kashmir valley, where they stayed in houseboats. In the summer of 1898, Nivedita travelled to Amarnath with Swami Vivekananda. Later in 1899, she travelled to the United States with Swami Vivekananda and stayed in Ridgely Manor in upstate New York.

She later recorded some of her tour and experiences with her master (guru) in the book The Master as I Saw Him and Notes on Some Wanderings with Swami Vivekananda.

She often used to refer to Swami Vivekananda as "The King" and considered herself as his spiritual daughter (Manaskanya in Bengali).

== Swami Vivekananda's death ==
Sister Nivedita saw Swami Vivekananda for the last time on 2 July 1902 at Belur Math. Vivekananda was observing the Ekadashi fasting on that day. However, when his disciples took their meal, he himself served them joyfully. After the meal, Vivekananda poured water over Nivedita's hands, and dried them with a towel. Nivedita recorded it in The Master As I Saw Him in the following words:

"It is I who should do these things for you, Swamiji! Not you, for me!" was the protest naturally offered. But his answer was startling in its solemnity – "Jesus washed the feet of His disciples!" Something checked the answer, "But that was the last time!" as it rose to the lips, and the words remained unuttered. This was well. For here also, the last time had come.

Swami Vivekananda died at 9:10 p.m. on 4 July 1902. On that night, Nivedita dreamed Sri Ramakrishna was leaving his body a second time. On the next morning, Swami Saradananda from Belur Math sent a monk with a letter to Sister Nivedita and conveying the message of Vivekananda's death. Instantly everything around Nivedita's eyes became blank. She immediately rushed to the Math and reached the place around 7 a.m. and entered the room of Vivekananda. There she found Swamiji's body was laid on the floor. She sat near Vivekananda's head and fanned his body with a hand fan until his body was taken down at 2 p.m. to the porch leading to the courtyard. In the afternoon of 5 July, Swami Vivekananda's body was taken for cremation. Vivekananda's body was wrapped in a saffron cloth. Nivedita wished to take a small portion of that cloth so that she could send it as a memento to Josephine MacLeod. Understanding the mind of Nivedita Swami Saradananda asked her to cut a small portion of the Swami's cloth. But, Nivedita was unsure whether the act would be proper or not and decided not to take it. When Vivekananda's body was being cremated, she sat all the while looking at the burning pyre. Around six o'clock in the evening, the burning flame was about to go out. Suddenly, Nivedita felt somebody had pulled her sleeve. She turned around and found a small piece of saffron cloth which had somehow come out of the pyre during cremation. Nivedita lifted and took the cloth, considering it as a message from the Swami. In her letter to Josephine MacLeod on 14 September 1902, Nivedita wrote:

...But your real message came at the burning pyre itself... At 6 o'clock... as if I were twitched by the sleeve, I looked down, and there, safe out of all that burning and blackness, there blew to my feet the very two or three inches I had desired out of the border of the cloth. I took it as a Letter from Him to you, from beyond the grave.

== Works of Sister Nivedita ==
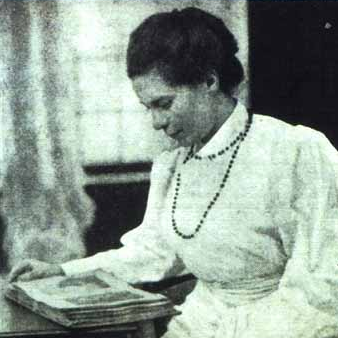
Sister Nivedita, reading a book

=== Girls' school in Bagbazar ===
Nivedita was planning to open a school for girls who were deprived of even basic education. She toured England and America on a lecture tour designed to raise money to establish a girls' school.

The main reason why Swamiji invited Nivedita to India was to spread education to the women of the country. This is why, when Nivedita informed Vivekananda about her planning, he felt very excited. He organised a meeting at Balaram Bose's house on this issue. Many lay devotees of Sri Ramakrishna, including Mahendranath Gupta (popularly known as Sri M., the chronicler of The Gospel of Sri Ramakrishna), Suresh Dutta, Haramohan etc. attended this meeting. In this meeting, Nivedita explained her plan of the proposed school and requested everyone to send their girls to the school to study. During her speech, Vivekananda entered the room and took a seat behind everyone. Nivedita did not notice it. But, when Nivedita appealed to collect girl students for the school, she suddenly discovered Vivekananda in the room pushing others and prompting – "Ye, get up, get up! It's not good enough to just become girls' fathers. All of you must co-operate in the matter of their education as per national ideals. Stand up and commit. Reply to her appeal. Say, 'We all agree. We shall send our girls to you." But no one stood up to support Nivedita's proposal. Finally, Vivekananda forced Haramohan to agree to the proposal and behalf of Haramohan, Vivekananda promised to send his girls to the school.

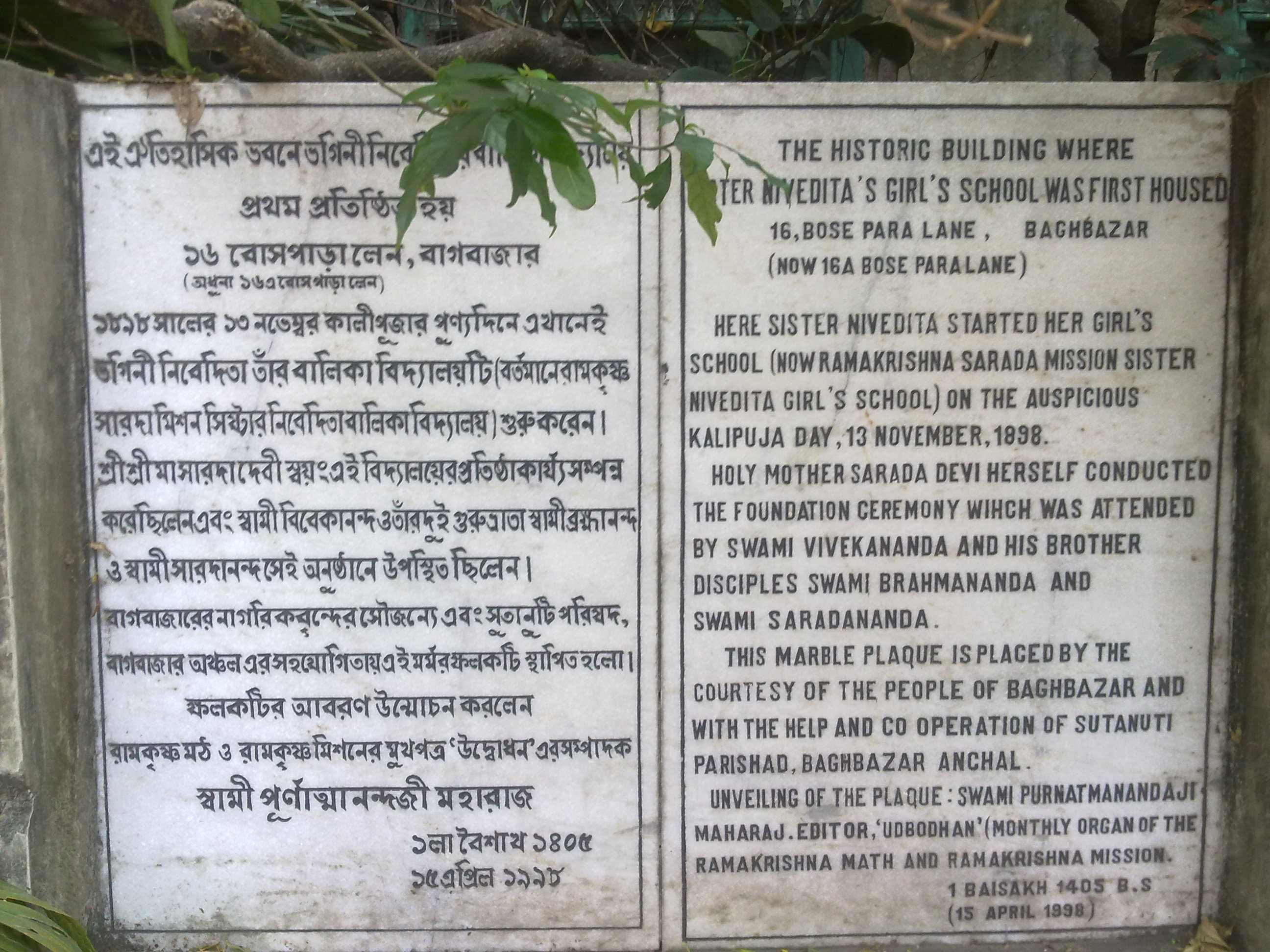
A memorial plaque in the house of Bagbazar where Sister Nivedita started her school

On 13 November 1898, on the day of Kali Puja, at 16 Bosepara Lane in the Bagbazar area of North Calcutta, she started the school. The school was inaugurated by Sarada Devi, in the presence of Swami Vivekananda and some of the other disciples of Ramakrishna. Sarada Devi blessed and prayed for the school saying – "I pray that the blessings of the Divine Mother may be upon the school and the girls; and the girls trained from the school may become ideal girls."Nivedita went from home to home in educating girls, many of whom were in pitiable condition owing to the socio-economic condition of early 20th century India. In many cases, she encountered refusal from the male members of the girl's family. Nivedita had widows and adult women among her students. She taught sewing, elementary rules of hygiene, nursing, etc., apart from regular courses.

Collecting money for the school was not an easy task. She had to earn money from her writings and giving lectures, and later she spent all to meet the expenses of the school.

She took part in altruistic activities. She worked to improve the lives of Indian women of all castes.

=== Work during plague epidemic ===
During the outbreak of a plague epidemic in Calcutta in 1899, Nivedita nursed and took care of the patients, cleaned rubbish from the area, and inspired and motivated many youths to render voluntary service. She inserted appeals for help in the English newspapers and requested for financial support for her plague relief activities. She also organised the day-to-day activities, inspected the work and personally handed over the written instructions for the preventive measures by moving around. She was a friend to many intellectuals and artists in the Bengali community, including Rabindranath Tagore, Jagadish Chandra Bose, Abala Bose, and Abanindranath Tagore. Later, she took up the cause of Indian independence. Sri Aurobindo was one of her friends as well.

=== Cultivation of Indian culture ===
She took an active interest in promoting Indian history, culture, and science. She actively encouraged Dr. Jagadish Chandra Bose, the Indian scientist and philosopher, to pursue original scientific research and helped him financially as well in getting due recognition when he was faced with an indifferent attitude from the colonial government. Bose, whom she called "khoka" or the "little one" in Bengali, and his wife Abala Bose, were in very close terms with her. Keeping in view Nivedita's contribution to the scientific research work of Jagadish Chandra, Rabindranath Tagore said: "In the day of his success, Jagadish gained an invaluable energiser and helper in Sister Nivedita, and in any record of his life's work her name must be given a place of honour." Sister Nivedita was one of the important influences on Jagadish Chandra Bose. She supported him by organising the financial support and editing his manuscripts and made sure that Bose was able to continue with and share his work.

Her identity as both a westerner by birth and a disciple of Swami Vivekananda enabled her to do several things that might have been difficult for Indians. For example, she promoted pan-Indian nationalism.

=== Contribution towards Indian nationalism ===
Nivedita became a prolific writer and toured India extensively to deliver lectures, especially on Indian culture and religions. She appealed to the youth of India to work selflessly for the cause of their country along the ideals of Swami Vivekananda. Before coming to India, Nivedita expressed a positive view towards continued colonial rule in India, a prevailing sentiment amongst her contemporaries in Europe. However, during the course of her time in India, Nivedita grew disillusioned with colonial rule and grew to support the nascent independence movement, concluding that it was necessary for India to gain independence to prosper. In February 1902, lawyer (and future leader of the independence movement) Mohandas Karamchand Gandhi visited Nivedita in Calcutta.

After Vivekananda's death, being acutely aware of the inconvenience of the newly formed Ramakrishna Mission on account of her political activities, she publicly dissociated herself from it. However, until her last days, she had a very cordial relationship with the brother disciples of Swami Vivekananda like Swami Brahmananda, Baburam Maharaj (Swami Premananda) and Swami Saradananda, who helped her in her charitable and educational activities in every possible way; she was very close to the holy mother, Sarada Devi.

Nivedita had initially worked with Okakura of Japan and Sarala Ghoshal who was related to the Tagore family.

She later started working on her own and maintained a direct relationship with many of the young revolutionaries of Bengal, including those of Anushilan Samity, a secret organisation. She inspired many youths in taking up the cause of Indian independence through her lectures. She also attacked Lord Curzon after his speech at the University of Calcutta in 1905 where he mentioned that truth was given a higher place in the moral codes of the West, than in the East. Nivedita undertook her own research and made it public that in the book Problems of The Far East by Curzon, he had proudly described how he had given false statements about his age and marriage to the President of the Korean Foreign Office to win his favour. This statement when published in newspapers like Amrita Bazar Patrika and The Statesman caused a furore and forced Curzon to apologise.

In 1905, the colonial government, under the direction of Lord Curzon, initiated the partition of Bengal which proved to be a major turning point in the Indian independence movement. Nivedita played a pioneering role in organising the movement. She provided financial and logistical support and leveraged her contacts to get information from government agencies and forewarn independence activists. She met Indian artists like Abanindranath Tagore, Ananda Coomaraswamy and E. B. Havell and inspired them to develop a pure Indian school of art. She always inspired and guided the talented students of the Calcutta Art School to move along the forgotten tracks of ancient Indian art like Nandalal Bose, Asit Kumar Haldar and Surendranath Gangopadhyay. She exerted great influence on the famous Tamil poet, Subramania Bharati, who met her only briefly in 1906. She influenced Bharati to work for the freedom of the women in the country, which he did all through his life. Nivedita had also designed a national flag for India with the thunderbolt as the emblem against a red background. Nivedita tried her utmost to inculcate the nationalist spirit in the minds of her students through all their daily activities. She introduced singing of the song Vande Mataram in her school as a prayer. Nivedita provided guarded support to Annie Besant and was very close to Aurobindo Ghosh (later Sri Aurobindo), one of the major contributors towards the early nationalist movement. She edited Karma Yogin, the nationalist newspaper of Aurobindo. The following piece is from an editorial in Karma Yogin, written by Nivedita, which depicts her intense respect for India:

The whole history of the world shows that the Indian intellect is second to none. This must be proved by the performance of a task beyond the power of others, the seizing of the first place in the intellectual advance of the world. Is there any inherent weakness that would make it impossible for us to do this? Are the countrymen of Bhaskaracharya and Shankaracharya inferior to the countrymen of Newton and Darwin? We trust not. It is for us, by the power of our thought, to break down the iron walls of opposition that confront us, and to seize and enjoy the intellectual sovereignty of the world.

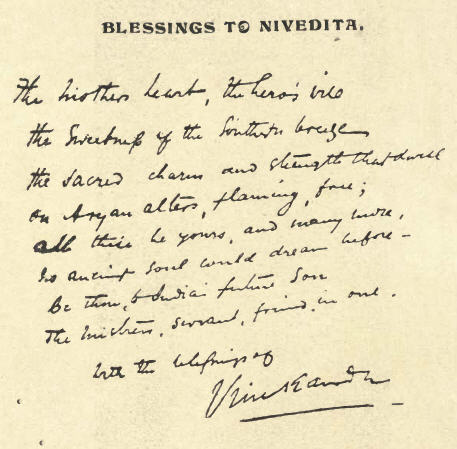
Manuscript of "Blessings to Nivedita" a poem written by Swami Vivekananda in his own handwriting

== Death ==
Nivedita died on 13 October 1911, aged 43, at Roy Villa, Darjeeling (present-day West Bengal, India). Today, her memorial is located below the Railway station on the way to the Victoria Falls (of Darjeeling) with these words inscribed in her epitaph: "Here lies Sister Nivedita who gave her all to India". Swami Vivekananda wrote a poem to Sister Nivedita, A benediction to Sister Nivedita. In this poem, Vivekananda condensed all his hopes, aspirations, and good wishes for his disciple, Nivedita as The mistress, servant, friend in one to India's future son:

The mother's heart, the hero's will
The sweetness of the southern breeze,
The sacred charm and strength that dwell
On Aryan altars, flaming, free;
All these be yours and many more
No ancient soul could dream before-
Be thou to India's future son
The mistress, servant, friend in one.

== Influence ==
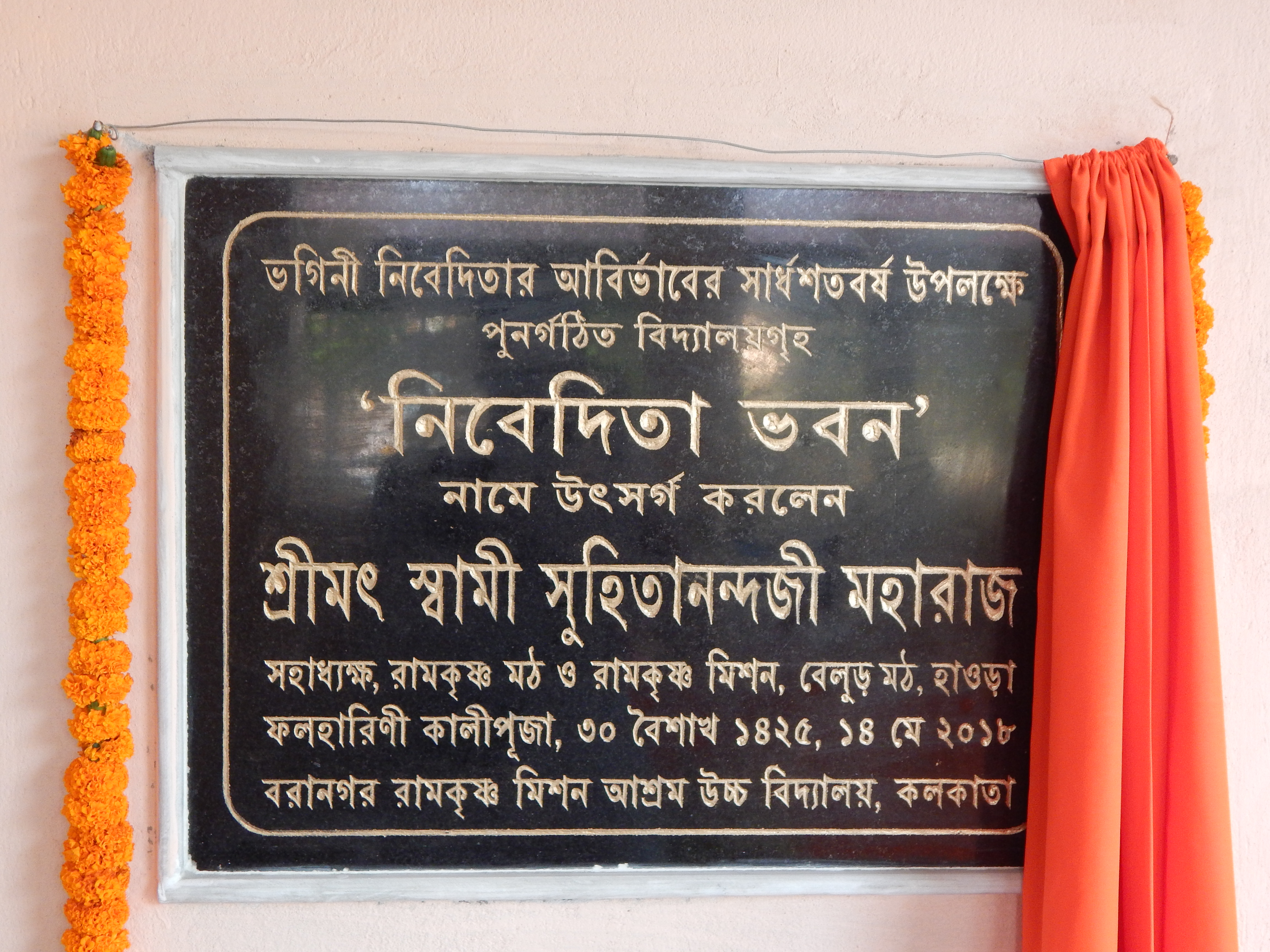
Name plaque of Nivedita Bhawan at Baranagore Ramakrishna Mission Ashrama High School

Sister Nivedita remains one of the most influential female figures of India. Her book Kali, the Mother influenced Abanindranath Tagore who painted Bharat Mata. In 2010, the office of the board of West Bengal Board of Secondary Education in Salt Lake City, Kolkata was named after Sister Nivedita. The Sister Nivedita Academy, an institution dedicated to her memory has been established in Chennai, Tamil Nadu. Several schools and colleges have been named after her. In 1968, the Indian Government issued a postal stamp in her memory. The Nivedita bridge near Dakshineswar, Kolkata is named in her honour. In 2015, a new Government Degree College at Hastings House, Alipur, Kolkata was named after Sister Nivedita. In 2018, the higher secondary section school building of Baranagore Ramakrishna Mission Ashrama High School at Kolkata was named after Sister Nivedita as "Nivedita Bhawan".

She influenced religious pluralism and the spiritual unity of humanity: "If the many and the One be indeed the same Reality, then it is not all modes of worship alone, but equally .. all modes of struggle, all modes of creation, which are paths of realization..Life is itself religion." Jeffrey D. Long was influenced by Sister Nivedita's work, which he considered as a "living bridge" for global pluralism and considered her as "a light for and from the west" and her advocacy for "we are one".

== Books ==
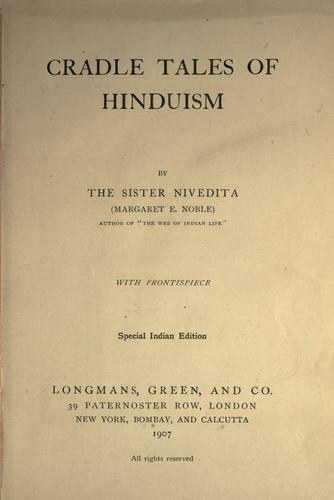
Title page of Sister's 1913 book Cradle Tales of Hinduism

Her works included The Web of Indian Life, which sought to rectify many myths in the Western world about Indian culture and customs, Kali the Mother, The Master as I Saw Him on Swami Vivekananda, Notes of Some Wanderings with the Swami Vivekananda on her travels from Nainital, Almora and other places with Swamiji, Cradle Tales of Hinduism on the stories from Puranas, Ramayana and Mahabharata, Studies from an Eastern Home, Civil Ideal and Indian Nationality, Hints on National Education in India, Glimpses of Famine and Flood in East Bengal – 1906.

- Kali the Mother, Swan Sonnenschein & Co.,. 1900.
- The Web of Indian Life, W. Heinemann 1904
- Cradle Tales of Hinduism, Longmans 1907
- An Indian Study of Love and Death, Longmans, Green & Co.,
- The Master as I Saw Him, 1910
- Select essays of Sister Nivedita, 1911 Ganesh & Co.,
- Studies from an Eastern Home, Longmans, Green & Co., 1913
- Myths of the Hindus & Buddhists, London : George G. Harrap & Co., 1913
- Notes of some wanderings with the Swami Vivekananda, 1913
- Footfalls of Indian History, Longmans, Green & Co., 1915
- Religion and Dharma, Longmans, Green, and Co., 1915
- Civic & national ideals. Udbodhan Office. 1929.

A newly annotated edition of The Ancient Abbey of Ajanta, that was serialised in The Modern Review during 1910 and 1911, was published in 2009 by Lalmati, Kolkata, with annotations, additions, and photographs by Prasenjit Dasgupta and Soumen Paul. Another collection of essays relating to Buddhism has been published by New Age Publishers of Kolkata titled Studies in Buddhism, that has been compiled and annotated by Prasenjit Dasgupta and Soumen Paul.

=== Biographies ===
In 1952, Ramakrishna Mission Sister Nivedita Girls' School during its Golden Jubilee Celebration, decided to bring out a biography of Sister Nivedita in English and Bengali. Though there were some biographies in English and Bengali before this, they lack in historical facts. The historical account of Sister Nivedita's life in Bengali was written by Pravrajika Muktiprana of Sri Sarada Math and was published in 1959. The materials for the biographies were sourced from Sister Nivedita's own works, letters and diaries, references made to her by some of her contemporaries, and interviews with those who had worked with her and her own students. Later, in 1961, the English version of the book written by Pravrajika Atmaprana was published as Sister Nivedita of Ramakrishna-Vivekananda. Since then, the books had seen several revisions.

Letters of Sister Nivedita were first published in two volumes in 1960. There were more than 800 letters, half of which were written to Miss Josephine MacLeod.

In 1975, Barbara Fox published in London a biography of Sister Nivedita titled Long Journey Home; this work attempts to gauge Nivedita's work from an English woman's point of view.

Nivedita Lokmata in Bengali was published in three volumes by Sankari Prasad Basu.

== See also ==
- Bhagini Nivedita, 1962 Indian film directed by Bijoy Basu
- Sister Nivedita University
- Bhagini Nivedita College
- Bhagini Nivedita Gramin Vigyan Niketan

== Cited sources ==
- Atmaprana, Pravrajika (1992) [1961]. Sister Nivedita of Ramakrishna-Vivekananda. Sister Nivedita Girls' School, Calcutta.
- Letters of Sister Nivedita Vol. 1 Vol. 2. Basu, Sankari Prasad (Ed.). 1960. Nababharat Publishers.
- The Complete Works of Sister Nivedita
  Volume 1: The Master as I Saw Him; Notes of Some Wanderings; Kedar Nath and Bhadri Narayan; Kali the Mother. ISBN 978-81-8040-458-0
  Volume 2: The Web of Indian Life; An Indian Study of Love and Death; Studies from an Eastern Home; Lectures and Articles. ASIN B003XGBYHG
  Volume 3: Indian Art; Cradle Tales of Hinduism; Religion and Dharma; Aggressive Hinduism. ISBN 978-1-177-78247-0
  Volume 4: Footfalls of Indian History; Civic Ideal and Indian Nationality; Hints on National Education in India; Lambs Among Wolves. ASIN B0010HSR48
  Volume 5: On Education; On Hindu Life, Thought and Religion; On Political, Economic and Social Problems; Biographical Sketches and Reviews. ASIN B0000D5LXI
