= The Master as I Saw Him =

1910 book by Sister Nivedita

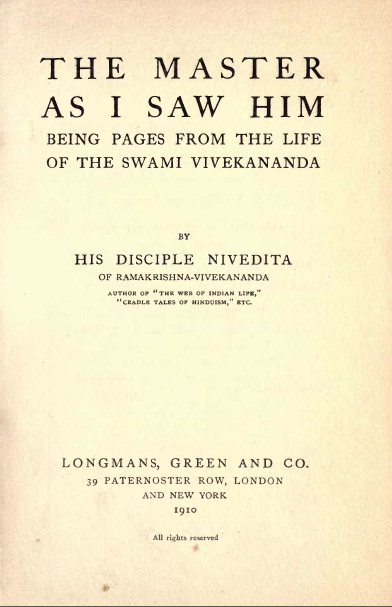
- Title page of 1910 edition
- Author: Sister Nivedita
- Original title: The Master as I Saw Him
- Language: England, India
- Subject: Biography
- Publication date: 1910
- Pages: 560 pp

The Master as I Saw Him: Being pages of the life of the Swami Vivekananda is a 1910 book written by Sister Nivedita. The book covers Nivedita's experiences with Swami Vivekananda, whom she met in London during November 1895. The book was simultaneously published from England and India, and The Master as I Saw Him is now considered to be a classic text.

In his book Indian Traffic, Parama Roy noted that the book differed from other biographies of Vivekananda in that it "[touched] upon the agonistic, conflictual nature of the guru-disciple relationship" and showed "reticence about his corporeality".
