= The Web of Indian Life =

1904 book by Sister Nivedita

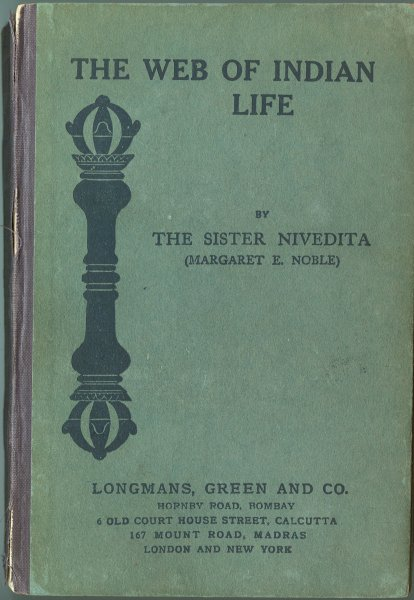
- The Web of Indian Life first edition front cover
- Author: Sister Nivedita
- Language: English
- Genre: Essays
- Publisher: W. Heinemann
- English publication date: 1904

The Web of Indian Life (1904) is a book written by Sister Nivedita. This book is a collection of essays and created a sensation when it was first published. The introduction of the book was written by Rabindranath Tagore.

== Theme ==
In these essays of the book, Nivedita discussed on several topics of India, lives of Indians and Hindu people. She also discussed some of the aspects of Indian life such as the caste system, the role and position of women in society, the Indian (Vedic) concept of birth and death, Indian pilgrimages, the invasion of Islam in India, etc.
