= Sankari Prasad Basu =

- Born: 21 October 1928; Howrah, West Bengal, India
- Died: 6 July 2014 (aged 85); Ramakrishna Mission Seva Pratishthan, Kolkata, India
- Occupations: Professor (retired), writer
- Known for: Vivekananda o Samakalin Bharatbarsha

Sankari Prasad Basu (21 October 1928 – 6 July 2014, also credited as Sankariprasad Basu) was an Indian scholar, writer and critic who wrote mainly in the Bengali language. He was a researcher on Swami Vivekananda and his books on the subject include Sahashya Vivekananda and Bandhu Vivekananda. One of his notable publications is his seven-volume research work Vivekananda o Samakalin Bharatbarsha, for which he won the prestigious Sahitya Akademi Award in 1978.

== Biography ==
Basu was born on 21 October 1928 in Howrah, West Bengal. He was a student at the Howrah Vivekananda Institution. He received an M.A. degree from Calcutta University, and later became a professor of Bengali literature there. He was appointed the head of the department in 1985, and remained in that position until his retirement in 1993.

He has been associated with the Swami Vivekananda Archives of the Ramakrishna Mission Institute of Culture in Kolkata from its founding in 1995 to the present day, and has served as director of the Archives. He died on 6 July at the Ramakrishna Mission Seva Pratishthan.

== Literary career ==
Basu had written 48 publications by 1999. Many of his printed works have been in Bengali, including biographies, essays, and criticism: Vivekananda o Samakalin Bharatbarsha (seven volumes), Sahasya Vivekananda, Nivedita Lokmata (four volumes), Samakalin Bharate Subhaschandra, Madhya Yuger kabi o Kabya, Chandidas o Bidyapati, Amader Nivedita, Krishna anad Rasasagar Vidyasagar. His English language books have included Comparative Religion and Swadeshi Movement in Bengal and Freedom Struggle of India, and he was the chief editor of the book Letters of Sister Nivedita. He has also penned books on cricket. Basu's seven-volume Vivekananda o Samakalin Bhartbarsha is considered a monumental work, for which he was honoured with Sahitya Akademi Award in 1978 by the Government of India.

=== Bibliography ===
Color key
Light green indicates "Bengali language book"; pink indicates "English language book"

Subject/Topic	Book	Publisher	ISBN
Swami Vivekananda	Vivekananda o Samakalin Bharatbarsha (seven volumes)	Mandal Book House	
Swami Vivekananda	Bandhu Vivekananda	Ananda Publishers	ISBN 8172159447
Swami Vivekananda	Sahasya Vivekananda	Nababharat Publishers	
Swami Vivekananda	Swami Vivekananda Natun Tathya Natun Alo	Ananda Publishers	
Swami Vivekananda	Vivekananda in Indian newspapers, 1893–1902	Bookland; Co-authored by Sunilabihari Ghosha	
Sister Nivedita	Amader Nivedita	Ananda Publishers	ISBN 8170668247
Sister Nivedita	Nivedita Lokmata (four volumes)	Ananda Publishers	ISBN 8172150385; ISBN 8170660319
Sister Nivedita	Letters of Sister Nivedita (editor)	Nababharat Publishers	
History of poetry	Madhya Juger Kobi O kabya	General Printers & Publishers	
Krishna	Krishna	Ananda Publishers	ISBN 8170668255
Ramakrishna, Sarada Devi	Ramkrishna Sarada Jiban O Prasanga	Ananda Publishers	ISBN 8172150342
History of Bengali poetry	Chandidas o Bidyapati		
Study of religion	Comparative religion	Rmic	ISBN 8187332522
Indian Independence Movement	Swadeshi Movement in Bengal and Freedom Struggle of India	Papyrus Publishing House	ISBN 8181750993
Swami Vivekananda, Mahatma Gandhi, Subhas Chandra Bose	Economic & Political Ideas: Vivekananda, Gandhi, Subhas Bose	Sterling	ISBN 8120722590
Bharatchandra Ray	Kabi Bhāratacandra	Mandala Buka Hausa	
Cricket	Bala paṛe byāṭa naṛe		
Cricket	Krikeṭa, sundara krikeṭa	Karuna Prakasani	
Cricket	Naṭa āuṭa		

== Awards ==
Basu has received the following awards and honours in his academic and literary career:

- Sahitya Akademi Award for Bengali language in 1978
- Ananda Puraskar in 1979
- Sarat Puraskar in 1980
- Vivekananda Award in 1986
- Vivekananda Soc. Centennial Award, New York in 1994
- Vidyasagar Puraskar by Government of West Bengal in 1996
