= Roy Villa =

Coordinates: 27.05662°N 88.258801°E

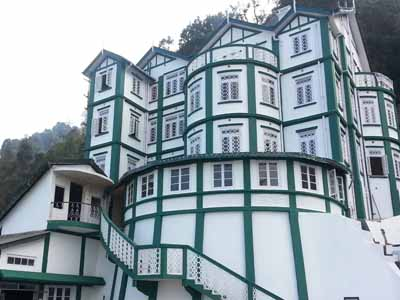
Roy Villa at Darjeeling after Restoration

Roy Villa is a four storied building situated at Lebong Cart Road, Darjeeling, West Bengal. The building holds a special significance in being the Death place of Sister Nivedita, the disciple of Swami Vivekananda who died on 13 October 1911.

== History of Roy Villa ==
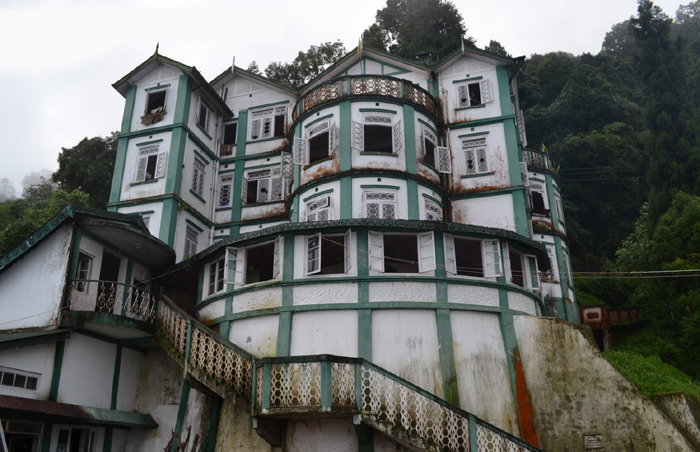
Roy Villa before Restoration

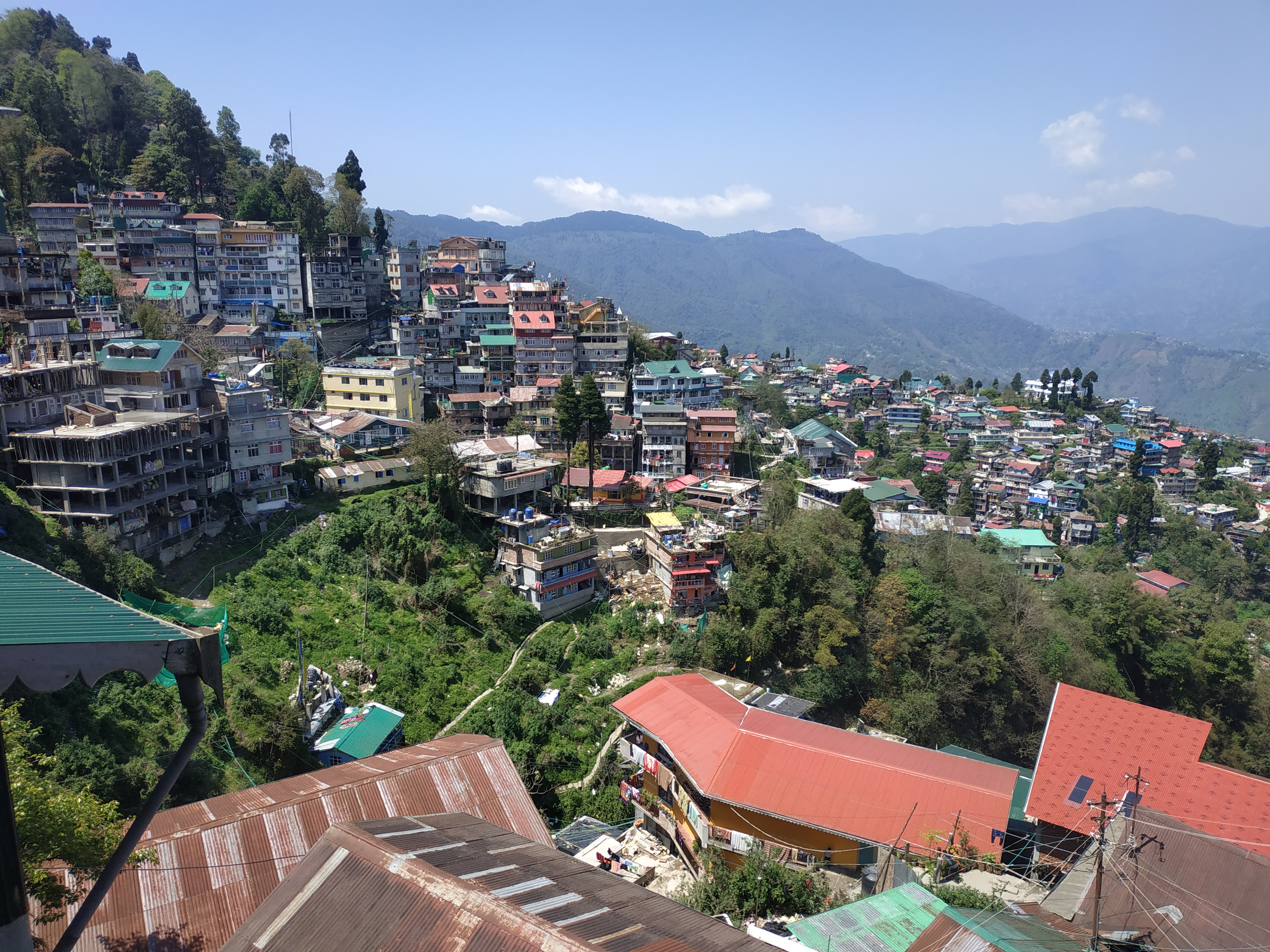
Darjeeling view from Roy Villa

This European castle-like structure is around 115 years old and is named after its original owner, Dwarakanath Roy. He was the brother of Mr. P. K. Roy, the first ever Principal of the Presidency College. Famous scientist & botanist Acharya Jagadish Chandra Bose rented this premises from his friend, Dwarakanath Roy due to its weather and ambience in summer. Later, when Sister Nivedita’s health was deteriorating, he & Lady Abala Bose invited Sister Nivedita to stay in this house. Sister Nivedita liked this place due to the soothing weather and started to live discreetly with them. Apart from Mr. & Mrs. Bose, famous Doctor Nil Ratan Sarkar and scientist Basiswar Sen were also present in the Roy Villa when Sister Nivedita died in 1911. From 1903 to 1911, Sister Nivedita stayed at Darjeeling for around 242 days in 7 different visits.

Duration of Sister Nivedita's stay in Roy villa	Days of stay
27 May 1903 to 14 July 1903	49
17 Aug 1903 to 25 Sept, 1903	40
20 Apr 1905 to 1 July 1905	73
5 Oct 1905 to 5 Nov 1905	32
16 Oct 1909 to 13 Nov 1909	29
6 Oct 1910 to 9 Oct 1910	04
29 Sept, 1911 to 13 Oct 1911	15
Total	242

== Later Stage ==
For several years, Roy Villa was abandoned until The Himalayan Mountaineering Institute took the place as its starting operation in 1954 when it was inaugurated by the then prime minister Pandit Jawaharlal Nehru. Initially there were 20 students who were taught in the Roy Villa but once the number of students increased, The Himalayan Mountaineering Institute shifted its base to the Western Spur of Birch Hill on 25 December 1957. For several years, Roy Villa was under the Youth Services Department of Govt. of West Bengal and then to the Gorkhaland Territorial Administration (GTA) before it was finally handed over to the Ramakrishna Mission.

== New Life of Roy Villa ==
After a series of discussion between GTA & State Government with the presence of Association for Conservation and Tourism, the Siliguri-based NGO who proposed to make Roy Villa a heritage site and Ramakrishna Mission, it has been decided that Roy Villa will be handed over. Mamata Banerjee handed over the Roy Villa to the Ramakrishna Mission in presence of Swami Suhitanandaji, General Secretary of Ramakrishna Math and Ramakrishna Mission, Belur Math on 16 May 2013. Finally, the key of the Roy Villa was handed over to Secretary of Ramakrishna Mission Nivedita Educational and Cultural Centre, a branch centre of Ramakrishna Mission, Belur Math on 10 July 2013, the auspicious day of Ratha Jatra by Sri Gautam Deb, Minister In - charge of North Bengal Development Department. State Government has sanctioned Rs. 1 crore for its restoration and its Information & Cultural Department will look after the heritage building.

== Present Status ==
Newly renovated, Roy Villa is currently under the control of Ramakrishna Mission, and they have taken on a series of projects to run from the premises. Her picture, old writing desk, chair, table lamp stand, wall clock, typewriter, and the old styled electric wiring are present within the building.

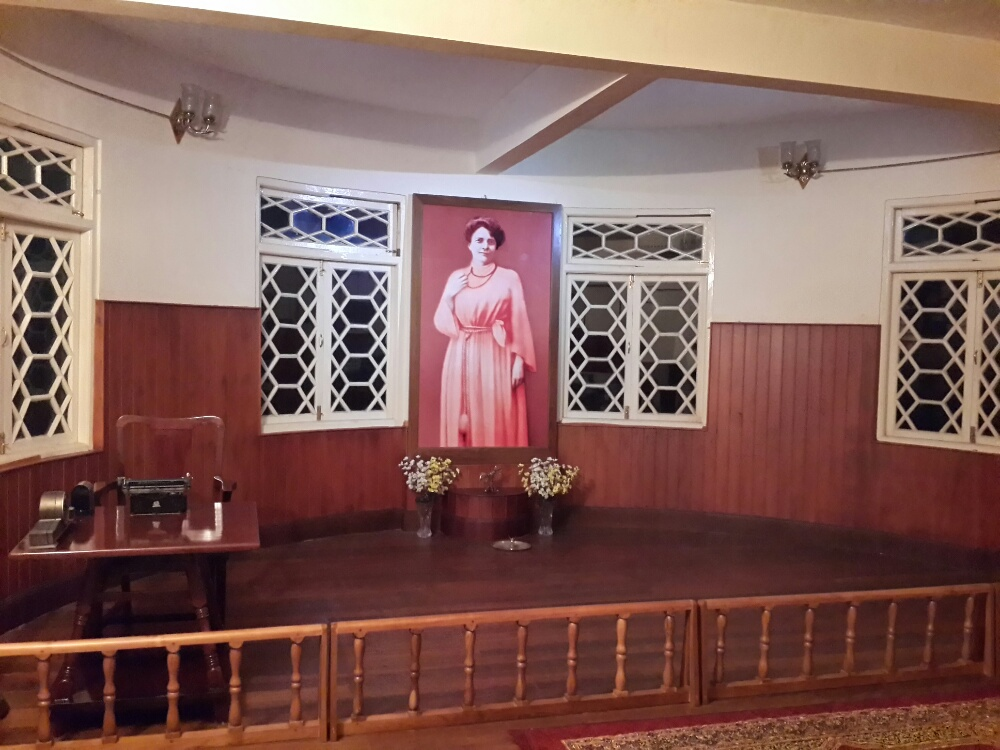
Renovated Sister Nivedita Room in Roy Villa

Apart from this, Nivedita Educational & Cultural Center has some more plans to execute:

- Free Computer Training Centre
- Free coaching center for joint entrance examinees and IAS / IPS aspirants
- Skill Development Centre for empowering women
- School of Languages
- Exhibition on the life of Sister Nivedita
- Gadadhar Abhyudaya Prakalpa for uplifting local children
- Monthly Ration amounting to 1,000/- to old-aged mothers
- Monthly Medical Camp with free Medicine

13 students in the last 1 year became financially benefited to procure books and 4 poor students received a scholarship of Rs. 12000/-.

== Recent News ==
=== Visit of Honourable governor Keshari Nath Tripathi ===
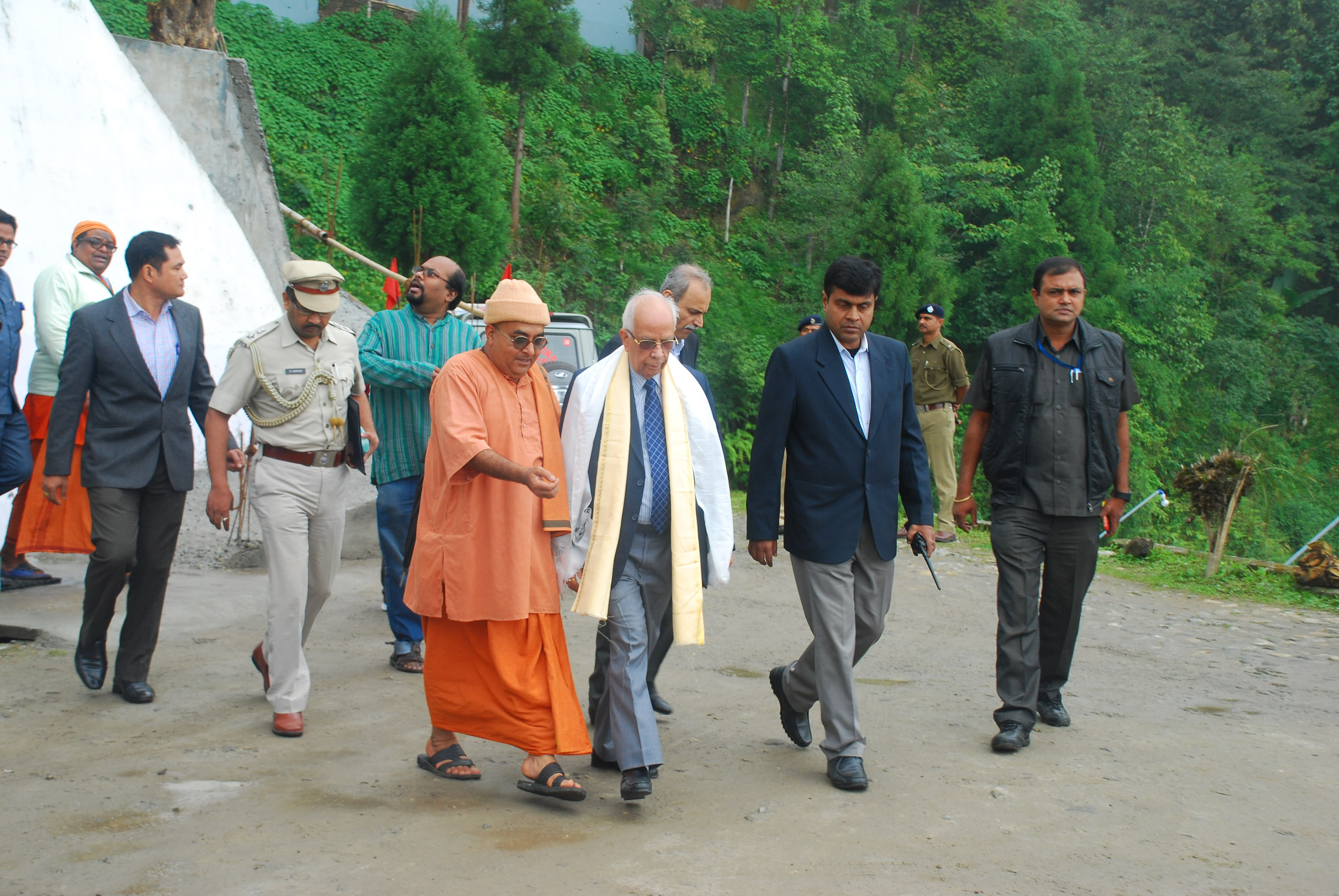
Visit of Honourable governor Keshari Nath Tripathi

Honorable governor Keshari Nath Tripathi visited the Centre on 6 June 2016.

Visit of Honourable governor Keshari Nath Tripathi

Visit of Honourable governor Keshari Nath Tripathi

Visit of Honourable governor Keshari Nath Tripathi

Visit of Honourable governor Keshari Nath Tripathi

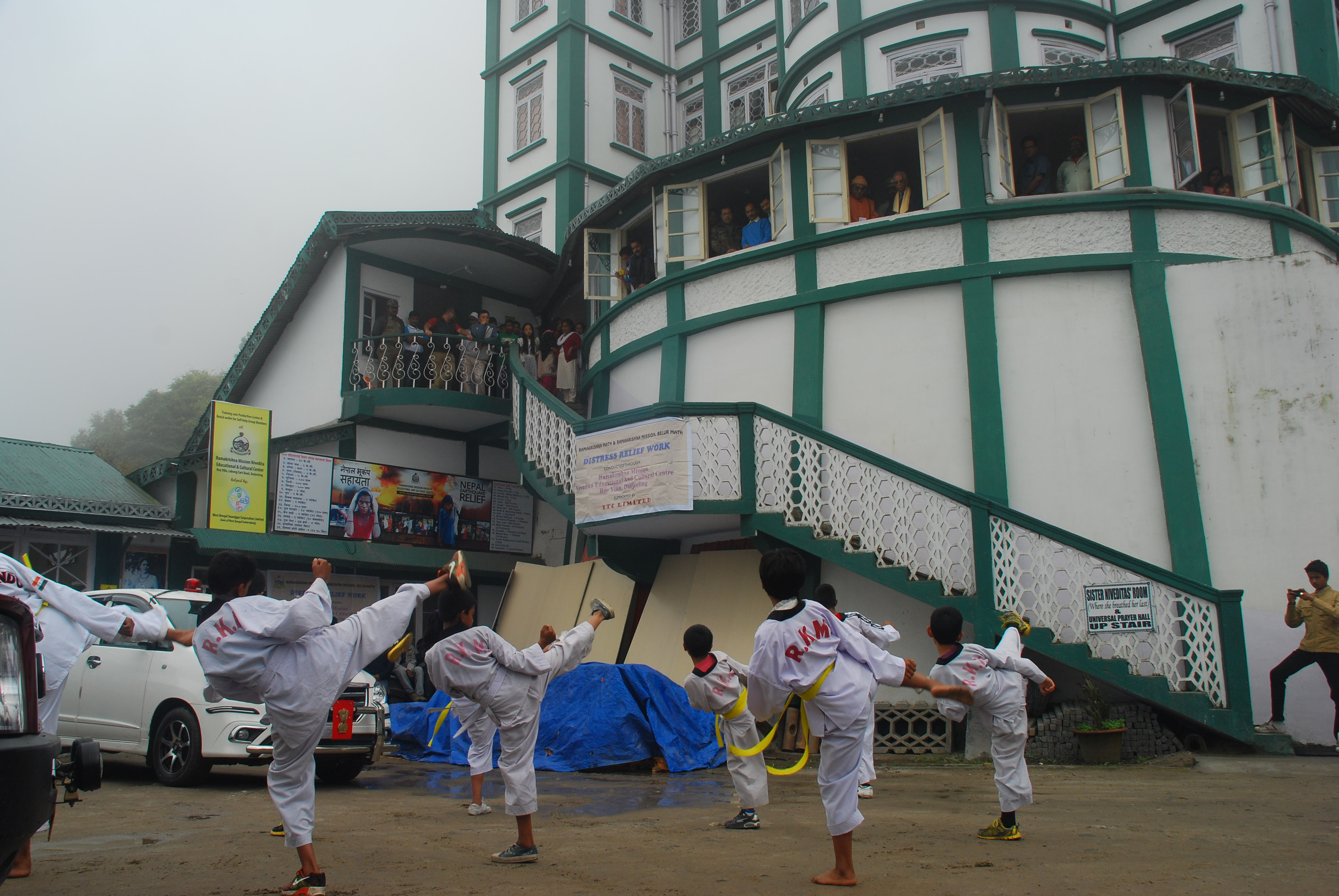
Students practising Tae-Kwondo in the premises of Roy Villa
