= Studies from an Eastern Home =

1913 book by Sister Nivedita

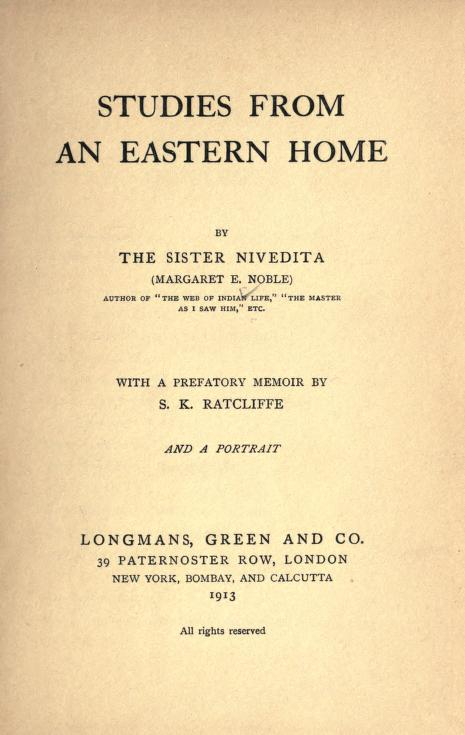
- Title page of 1913 edition
- Author: Sister Nivedita
- Language: English
- Publisher: Longmans, Green & Co.
- English publication date: 1913

Studies from an Eastern Home (1913) is an autobiographical book written by Sister Nivedita.

== Background ==
Nivedita met Swami Vivekananda in 1895 in London. From the first day of meeting with the Swami Nivedita considered him as a prophet. Vivekananda asked her to come to India and serve the nation. Responding to the call of Swami Vivekananda, Nivedita came to India in 1898 and served the nation as a social worker for the rest of her life. In this book, Nivedita describes cultural and historical events that she experienced in India such as Durga Puja, Dol-jatra, Ras–festival, Janmashtami celebration, and the plague epidemic in Kolkata. She also shares personal memories including her travels to northern India.
