= Khandana Bhava–Bandhana =

Bengali song composed by Swami Vivekananda

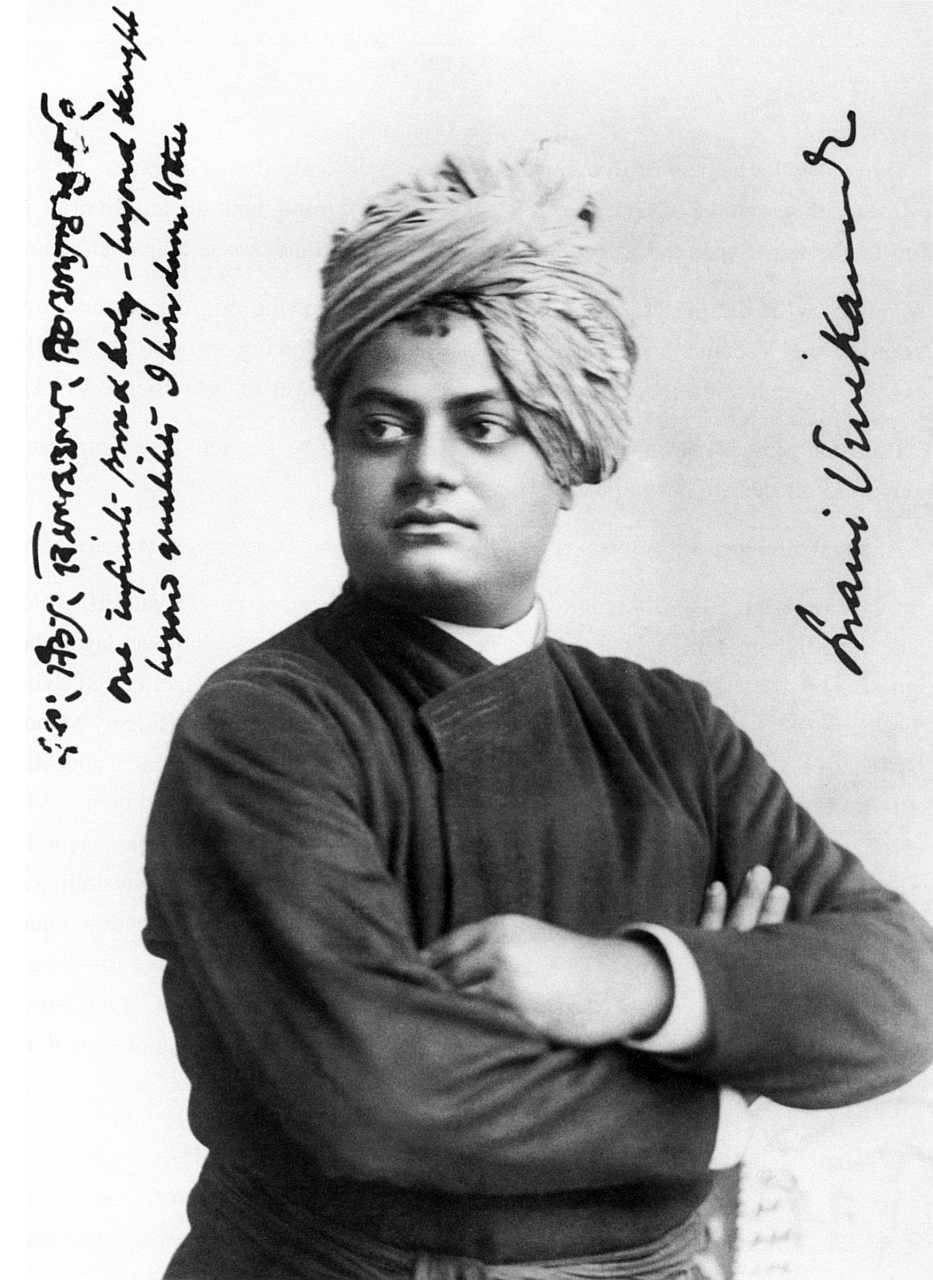
Song by Swami Vivekananda
- Language: Bengali
- Genre: Prayer
- Songwriter: Swami Vivekananda
- Composer: Swami Vivekananda
- Based on Raga Mishra Kalyani, Tala Ferta (Choutal, Tintal, Ektal)

Khandana Bhava–Bandhana, (Note: Bengali: খন্ডণ ভব-বন্ধন) Sri Ramakrishna Aratrikam, or Sri Ramakrishna Arati ("Breaker of this world’s chain"), is a Bengali song composed by Hindu monk Swami Vivekananda. The song, dedicated to the 19th-century saint Ramakrishna, was composed in 1898. Khandana Bhava–Bandhana is a prayer song based on Raga Mishra Kalyani, Tala Ferta (Choutal, Tintal, Ektal) used in Indian classical music.

Vivekananda's message through the poem was to encourage those who have freed themselves from the binds and suffering of the world spread their knowledge of freedom widely until they all are filled with tremendous passion for freedom [from the world's binds and suffering].

== History ==
Vivekananda, who died in 1902, was the star disciple of the Holy Saint Sri Ramakrishna. To follow Sri Ramakrishna's teachings, Vivekananda established Ramakrishna Math monastic order, which became part of the reform movements for regeneration to Hinduism. He became a key figure in the introduction of Indian philosophies of Vedanta and Yoga to the western world. He made several tours around the United States and Europe. In 1898, he was in Calcutta, India, taking part in the consecration of Ramakrishana Math monastery set up in the house of Nilambar Babu, a disciple of Ramakrishna. Vivekananda wrote the poem during his stay there.

This arati is sung in all Ramakrishna maths and Ramakrishna missions in their daily prayers.

== Theme ==
Vivekananda's deliberate attempt was to free individuals and relieve them from sufferings and bondage. He dedicated his life to this work, the same passion can be found in this prayer song.

Khandana Bhava–Bandhana
Listen to the full hymn by Vivekananda, sung by Swami Purushottamananda
Dedicated to Sri Ramakrishna (pictured)

In this hymn Vivekananda addresses Ramakrishna, his master and praises him. He says his master is the breaker of the world's chain who is spotless who came to this world taking human form, he is embodiment of divine knowledge. He looks at the eyes of his master and finds they are bright with the wisdom of God and feels that can wake him from Maya. Vivekananda again praises his master for his sacrifice, as he thinks his master freely chose to take birth "in this prison" to unchain men from prison. Finally, he requests his master's blessings and requests him to come to his heart's black cave and illuminate it, since his master, in his view, is "light of the light".

== Lyrics ==
The Khandana Bhava–Bandhana was written by Swami Vivekananda in Bengali as a hymn to his guru, Sri Ramakrishna. The English translation by Swami Prabhavananda and Christopher Isherwood is used by English-speaking Vedanta Centers in the evening vesper worship services:

Breaker of this world's chain,
We adore Thee, whom all men love.
Spotless, taking man's form, O Purifier,
Thou art above the gunas three,
Knowledge divine, not flesh;
Thou whom the cosmos wears,
A diamond at its heart.

Let us look deep in Thine eyes;
They are bright with the wisdom of God,
That can wake us from Maya's spell.
Let us hold fast to Thy feet,
Treading the waves of the world to safety.
Oh, drunk with love, God-drunken Lover,
In Thee all paths of all yogas meet.

Lord of the worlds, Thou art ours,
Who wert born a child of our time;
Easy of access to us.
O Merciful, if we take any hold
Upon God in our prayer,
It is by Thy grace alone,
Since all Thine austerities
Were practiced for our sake.

How great was Thy sacrifice,
Freely choosing Thy birth,
In this prison, our Iron Age,
To unchain us and set us free.
Perfect, whom lust could not taint,
Nor passion nor gold draw near,
O Master of all who renounce,
Fill our hearts full of love for Thee.

Thou hast finished with fear and with doubt,
Standing firm in the vision of God;
Refuge to all who have cast
Fame, fortune, and friends away.
Without question Thou shelterest us,
And the world's great sea in its wrath
Seems shrunk to the puddle
That fills the hoofprint in the clay.

Speech cannot hold Thee, nor mind,
Yet without Thee we think not nor speak.
Love, who art partial to none,
We are equal before Thy sight.
Taker-away of our pain,
We salute Thee, though we are blind.
Come to the heart's black cave, and illumine,
Thou light of the light.

The Hymn to the Divinity of Shri Ramakrishna poem/song by Swami Vivekananda was written in Bengali, Sanskritized and translated numerous times. Its English text is rendered from the Bengali original.

== See also ==
- Vaishnava Jana To
