= Kali the Mother (book) =

1900 book by Sister Nivedita

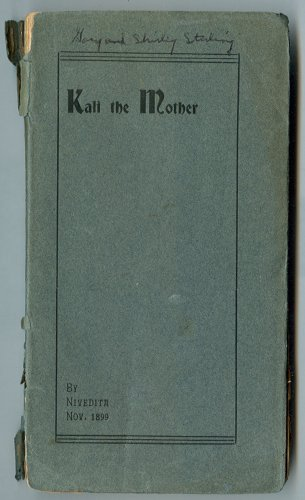
- Kali The Mother first edition cover page
- Author: Sister Nivedita
- Language: English
- Publisher: Swan Sonnenschein & Co
- English publication date: 1900

Kali the Mother (1900) is an English book written by Sister Nivedita. Kali is a popular Hindu goddess who is considered to free her worshippers from fear (anxiety) and all troubles. In this book Nivedita celebrated this Indian goddess Kali.

== Chapters ==
- Title Page
- Contents
- Concerning Symbols
- The Vision of Siva
- Two Saints of Kali
- The Voice of the Mother
- A Visit to Dukineshwar
- An Intercession
- The Story of Kali for a Western Baby
- Kali the Mother
- Works by the Swâmi Vivekânanda
