= Myths of the Hindus & Buddhists =

1913 book by Sister Nivedita and Ananda K. Coomaraswamy

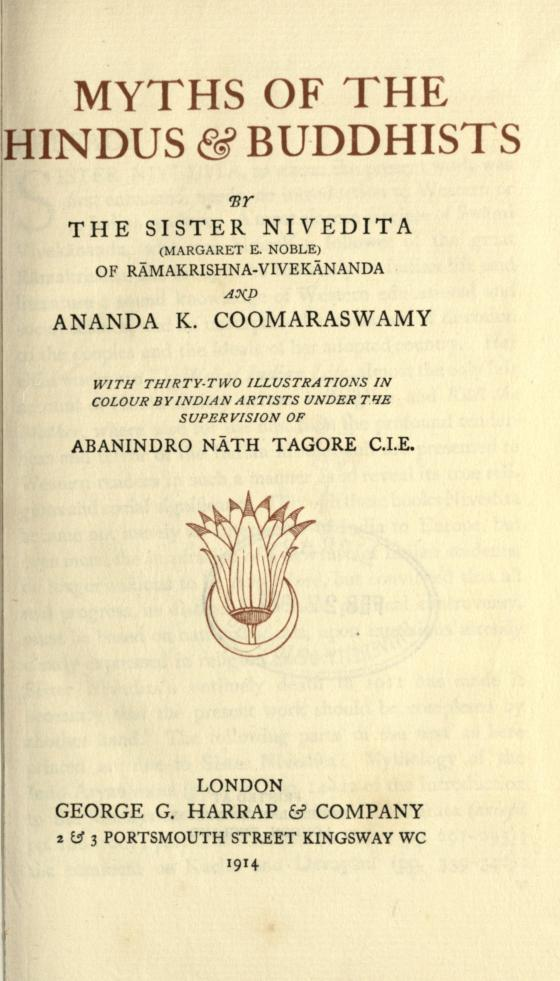
- Myths of the Hindus & Buddhists title page (1914 edition)
- Author: Sister Nivedita and Ananda K. Coomaraswamy
- Publisher: London : George G. Harrap & Co.,.
- English publication date: 1913

Myths of the Hindus & Buddhists (1913) is a book written by Sister Nivedita and Ananda K. Coomaraswamy.

== Background ==
Responding to the call of Swami Vivekananda, Sister Nivedita travelled to India in 1898. Josephine MacLeod, a friend and devotee of Swami Vivekananda, asked him how best she could help him and got the reply to "Love India". Nivedita wrote multiple books on Indian history, culture, Vedic religion, Hinduism, Buddhism, etc.

== Myths ==
In this book the author included and narrated some myths and stories from ancient Hindu and Buddhist literature. The book includes a good number of water colour illustrations which were created under the supervision of Abanindranath Tagore. Tagore himself drew some of the pictures in the book.

The myths and stories of this book include–

- Mythology of the Indo-Aryan Race
- Ramayana
- Mahabharata
- Krishna
- Buddha
- Shiva
- Other stories from Puranas, epics and Vedas
