= Influence and legacy of Swami Vivekananda =

Impact of Indian monk and philosopher

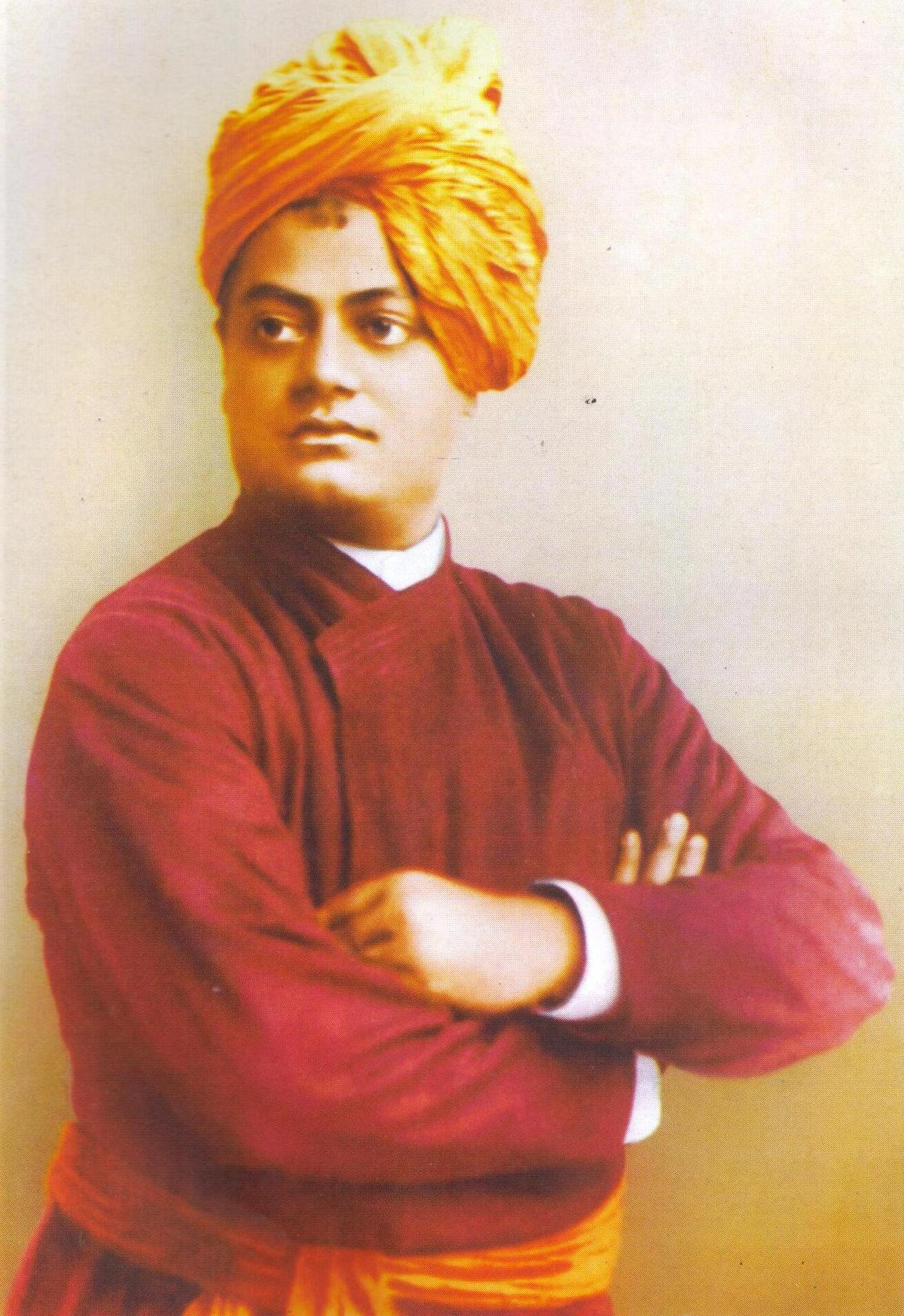
Swami Vivekananda

Swami Vivekananda, the nineteenth-century Indian Hindu monk, philosopher and spiritual mentor, is considered to be one of the most influential people of modern India and Hinduism. Celebrated particularly for his skill and power as a speaker, he was also one of the first and most successful missionaries of Vedanta to the Western world.

Rabindranath Tagore suggested that much could be learned about India through study of Vivekananda's works. Indian independence activist Subhas Chandra Bose regarded Vivekananda as his spiritual teacher. Mahatma Gandhi said that after reading the works of Vivekananda, his love for his nation increased a thousandfold. Barack Obama, the President of the United States, quoted Vivekananda's words in his speech delivered in India in November 2010. Jayalalithaa, the Chief Minister of Tamil Nadu said that Vivekananda inspired her to enter politics.

Vivekananda's birthday, on 12 January, is celebrated as National Youth Day in India. In 2012, a three-day world conference was organised by the Institute of World Religions to commemorate the 150th birth anniversary of Swami Vivekananda.

== Influence on notable Indian people ==
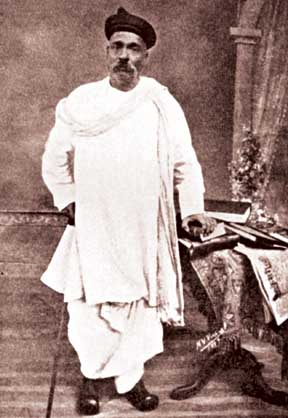
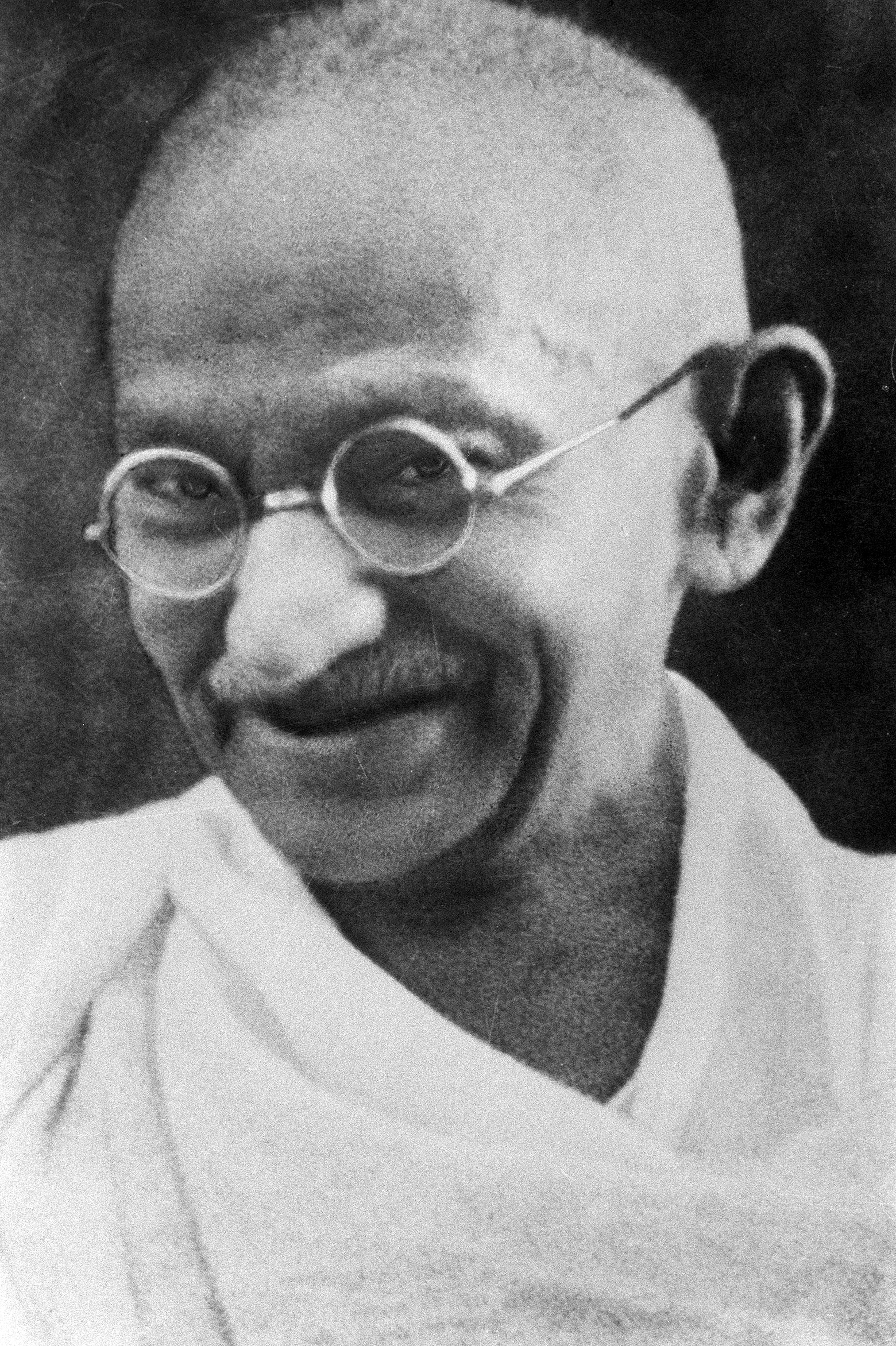
Left: Bal Gangadhar Tilak (1856–1920) said that Swami Vivekananda preached Hindu religion in the length and breadth of the world. Right: Mahatma Gandhi said that after reading the works of Vivekananda, his love for his nation became a thousand-fold.

After becoming a sannyasin in 1886, Vivekananda developed a deep desire to spread the message of “divine unity of existence and unity in diversity’ throughout the country. He travelled the length and breadth of India as a Parivrajaka ("wandering monk"). He travelled for two years, befriending many notable people and teaching his Advaita Vedanta philosophy. Many of them, such as Ajit Singh of Khetri in Rajasthan, the Dewan of Porbandar and Junagadh in Gujarat, the Raja of Ramnad in Madras, the Dewan of Mysore K. Seshadri Iyer, and the Maharaja of Mysore Chamaraja Wodeyar, encouraged him to travel to the United States to attend the Parliament of World Religions in Chicago, and gave financial support.

Indian nationalist Bal Gangadhar Tilak, the first popular leader of the Indian Independence Movement, observed:

Twelve centuries ago Sankaracharya was the only great personality, who not only spoke of the purity of our religion, not only uttered in words that this religion was our strength and wealth, not only said that it was our sacred duty to preach this religion in the length and breadth of the world – but also brought all this into action. Swami Vivekananda is a person of that stature—who appeared towards the last half of the 19th century.

Rabindranath Tagore said "If you want to know India, study Vivekananda. In him everything is positive and nothing negative." According to Sri Aurobindo, Vivekananda was "a very lion among men, but the definite work he has left behind is quite incommensurate with our impression of his creative might and energy." Bal Gangadhar Tilak praised Vivekananda for taking the initiative to re-establish the glory of Hinduism. According to Bipin Chandra Pal, Vivekananda's message was "the message of modern humanity".

Mahatma Gandhi, at Belur Math on 6 February 1921, paid homage to Vivekananda:

I have come here to pay my homage and respect to the revered memory of Swami Vivekananda, whose birthday is being celebrated today. I have gone through his works very thoroughly, and after having gone through them, the love that I had for my country became a thousand-fold. I ask you, young men, not to go away empty-handed without imbibing something of the spirit of the place where Swami Vivekananda lived and died.

During his journey from Japan to Canada on the ship Empress in 1893, Vivekananda met Jamsetji Tata and discussed with him the necessity of establishing a world-class scientific Institution in India. Consequently, Tata established the Indian Institute of Science, which gradually became one of the best-known research universities in India.

Indian independence activist Subhas Chandra Bose called Vivekananda a "full-blooded masculine personality – and a fighter to the core of his being". Bose said that under the "sacred influence" of Ramakrishna and Vivekananda his own life was awakened.

Jawaharlal Nehru, the first Prime Minister of Independent India, praised Vivekananda's personality and dignity and said that his heart carried fire: "it was no empty talk he was indulging in. He was putting his heart and soul into the words he uttered." Nehru also spoke of the influence Vivekananda had on his generation, particularly through his modern outlook that blended science and spirituality.

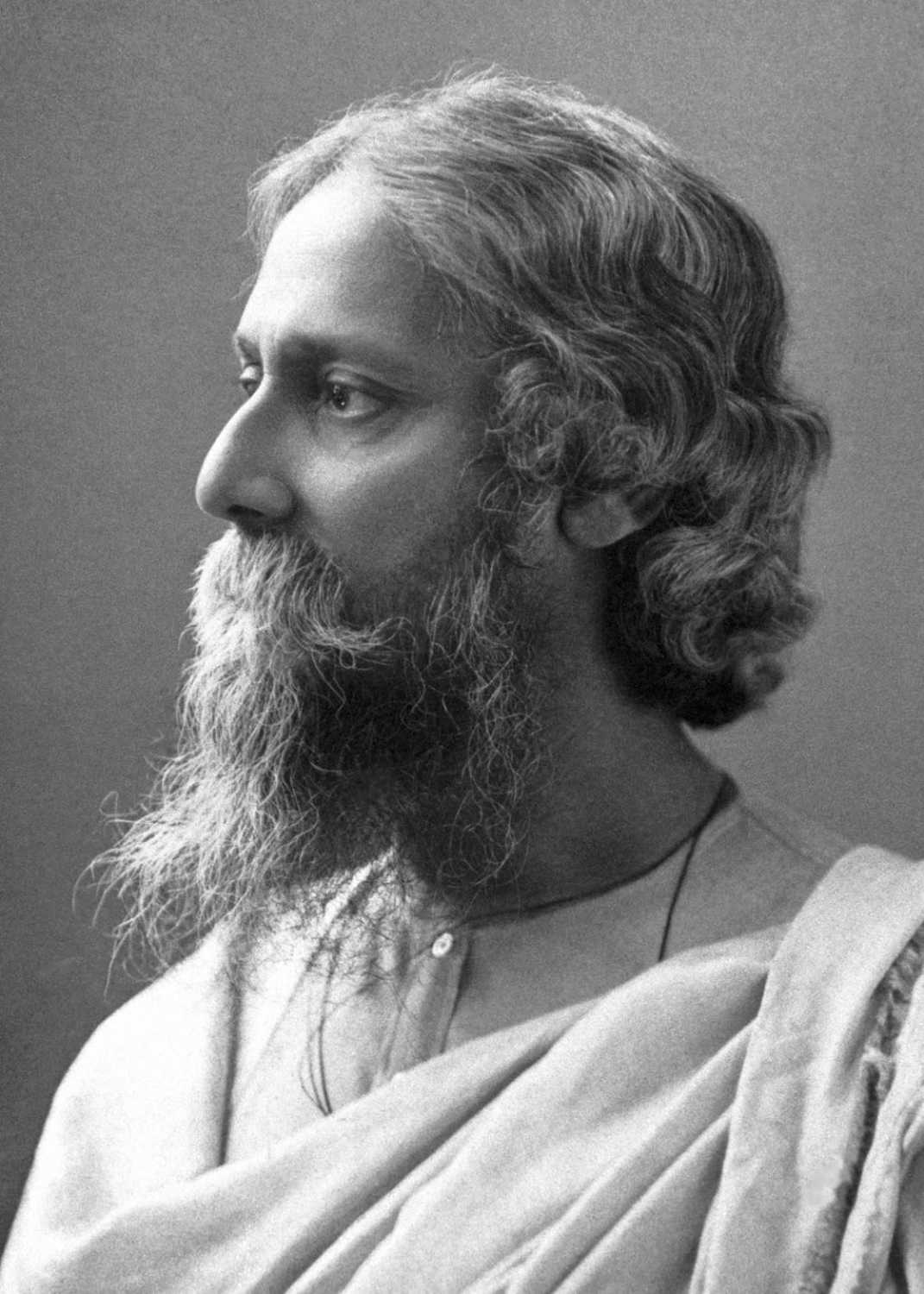
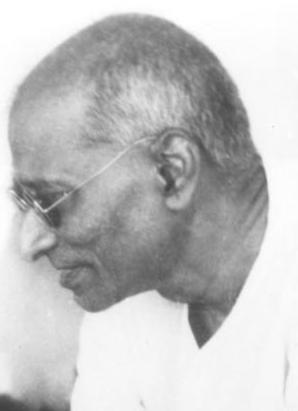
Left: Rabindranath Tagore (left) suggested reading Vivekananda to learn about India. Right: C Rajagopalachari said that Vivekananda saved Hinduism and India.

Vinoba Bhave honoured Vivekananda for seeking to make Indians conscious of their strength during a time of widespread poverty and oppression, and for exhorting them to overcome their weaknesses. According to Bhave, the people of India were shrouded in tamas, ignorance and unwisdom, and unable to distinguish between weakness and non-attachment and peace. In this situation Vivekananda brought new light, emphatically teaching that "the same Soul resides in each and all", and that mankind could be served by remembering this.

According to Indian independence activist and social worker C. Rajagopalachari, who became the first Indian Governor General of India, Vivekananda saved Hinduism and India. Sarvepalli Radhakrishnan, the first vice-president and the second President of independent India, said that Vivekananda was born in a "critical period" when the nation and her people were collapsing in "despair, frustration and hopelessness". Vivekananda's teachings gave the people new hope and taught them to rely on spiritual resources.

According to Indian historian Ramesh Chandra Majumdar, Vivekananda preached the best parts of Hinduism and Indian spirituality to the world. At home, his ideals added a spiritual basis to Indian nationalism. Majumdar noted:

Though an ascetic, Vivekananda was a patriot of patriots. The thought of restoring the prehistoric glory of India by resuscitating among her people the spiritual vitality which was dormant, but not dead, was always the uppermost thought in his mind...

In 2013, former President of India Pranab Mukherjee suggested remembering Vivekananda's call to reconstruct India's national character. He said:

Swamiji unhesitatingly appreciated the positive aspects and accomplishments of the Western Societies – and refrained from being dogmatic as he made his point, he was able to build a robust new bridge of understanding and goodwill for India. In so doing, he also opened a new dialogue between our peoples based on mutual acceptance.

Narendra Modi, the Prime minister of India, often invokes Vivekananda's name when promoting his political ideology. In April 2013, he visited Belur Math and meditated in the room of Vivekananda.

Jayalalithaa, the Chief Minister of Tamil Nadu, said that Vivekananda inspired her to enter politics. Mamata Banerjee, the Chief Minister of West Bengal, was inspired by Vivekananda's writings which she said helped her in the difficult times of her political career. Banerjee stated:

In the course of the several movements that I led, there would be moments of doubt. There were some who were critical of me and even I wondered that there were so many people who had pinned their hopes on me. What if I were to fail them? I would read books written by Swami Vivekananda to gather my strength.

Social activist Anna Hazare was motivated by the works of Swami Vivekananda and took inspiration for all the social work he did from Swami Vivekananda only. Arvind Kejriwal, anti-corruption campaigner and former Chief Minister of Delhi, also spoke of being inspired by Vivekananda. In a letter to the youth of India in 2015, he said:

I always believed that truth is timeless. These words by Swami Vivekananda are as relevant today as they were when we had to struggle for freedom. And they will be just as relevant, decades after I have left this world.

== Influence on non-Indian people ==
Vivekananda, during and after his tour of western countries in Europe and the United States had profound influence on notable personalities, who either became his ardent devotees or friends and some even his ardent disciples and many of whom even became ascetics. Right at the beginning of his visit to Chicago to address the Parliament of World Religions Professor John Henry Wright of Harvard University, invited him to speak at Harvard. He pointed out to Vivekananda the necessity of going to the Parliament of Religions, which he thought would give an introduction to the nation. Wright's reasoning was "To ask for your credentials is like asking the sun to state its right to shine in the heavens". Some of such well-known luminaries are: Max Müller (Indologist), J. J. Goodwin, John Henry Barrows, Mark Twain, Sturdy, Romain Rolland, Sara Chapman Bull, his American mother and benefactor, Mary Hale, Josephine MacLeod, Christine Greenstidel (who later came to be known as Sister Christine), Maragaret Noble (Sister Nivedita in later years), William James, Josiah Royce, Robert G. Ingersoll, Nikola Tesla, Lord Kelvin, Harriet Monroe, Ella Wheeler Wilcox, Sarah Bernhardt, Emma Calvé and Hermann Ludwig Ferdinand von Helmholtz He initiated several followers : Marie Louise (a French woman) became Swami Abhayananda, and Leon Landsberg became Swami Kripananda,

American industrialist John D. Rockefeller reportedly made his first large donation for public welfare and later became a notable philanthropist after a meeting with Vivekananda. Vivekananda succinctly explained to Rockfeller that his philanthropy would only be a channel to help the poor and distressed people.

Vivekananda influenced French Opera singer Emma Calvé, who wrote in her autobiography:

It has been my good fortune and my joy to know a man who truly "walked with God," a noble being, a saint, a philosopher, and a true friend. His influence upon my spiritual life was profound. He opened up new horizons before me, enlarging and vivifying my religious ideas and ideals, teaching me a broader understanding of truth. My soul will bear him an eternal gratitude.

Vivekananda's life and works have influenced many scholars, writers, politicians worldwide. French writer Romain Rolland wrote that Vivekananda was "energy personified". Rolland felt "kingliness" was Vivekananda's characteristics, "He was a born king and nobody ever came near him in India or America without paying homage to his majesty." American writer, historian, philosopher Will Durant told, the speeches of Vivekananda were more "virile" than the ones delivered in the Vedic times.

The nationalist leader and the first president of independent Indonesia Sukarno said that it was Swami Vivekananda who inspired him to become strong and to serve God and mankind. Historian and Indologist Arthur Llewellyn Basham compared Vivekananda with other eminent religious figures of India such as Kabir, Adi Shankara, Chaitanya. Russian academician and public figure Eugene Chelyshev was an ardent admirer of Swami Vivekananda. He said:

Reading and re-reading the works of Vivekananda each time I find in them something new that helps deeper to understand India, its philosophy, the way of the life and customs of the people in the past and the present, their dreams of the future...

Chelyshev also predicted that the memory of Vivekananda will never fade away. Chinese scholar Huan Xin Chuan stated that Vivekananda was the most renowned social figure of modern China and Chinese socialists carefully study the works of Vivekananda.

Barack Obama, the President of the United States, quoted Vivekananda's words in his speech delivered in India in November 2010. He said:

Instead of succumbing to division, you have shown that the strength of India—the very idea of India—is its embrace of all colors, castes and creeds. It's the diversity represented in this chamber today. It's the richness of faiths celebrated by a visitor to my hometown of Chicago more than a century ago—the renowned Swami Vivekananda. He said that, "holiness, purity and charity are not the exclusive possessions of any church in the world, and that every system has produced men and women of the most exalted character."

== Notable memorials and observations ==
=== National Youth Day ===
Swami Vivekananda's birthday, i.e. 12 January, is celebrated as the National Youth Day in India. On 17 October 1984, the Indian Government officially declared the birthdate of Vivekananda as the National Youth Day, which was to be celebrated 1985 onwards. The circular stated: "it was felt that the philosophy of Swamiji and the ideals for which he lived and worked could be a great source of inspiration for the Indian Youth."

=== Universal Brotherhood Day ===
The "Universal Brotherhood Day" is observed on 11 September, on the day when Vivekananda delivered his first speech at the Parliament of the World's Religions Chicago in 1893 and addressed the American people and his audience as "Sisters and brothers of America".

=== 150th birth anniversary of Swami Vivekananda ===
The 150th birth anniversary of Swami Vivekananda was celebrated in India and abroad during 2013. The Ministry of Youth Affairs and Sports in India officially made an official declaration in this regard. Year-long events and programs have been organised by branches of the Ramakrishna Math, the Ramakrishna Mission, the central and state governments in India, educational institutions and youth groups. Bengali film director Tutu (Utpal) Sinha made a film, The Light: Swami Vivekananda, and Indian American Bengali animator and laserist Manick Sorcar created a laser show, Swamiji, as a tribute for his 150th birth anniversary.

Swami Vivekananda delivered his famous lectures at the Parliament of the World's Religions, Chicago in 1893. In 2012, a 3-day World conference was organised by the Institute of World Religions (of the Washington Kali Temple), Burtonsville, Maryland, in association with the Council for Parliament of World Religions, Chicago, Illinois to commemorate the 150th birth anniversary of Swami Vivekananda.

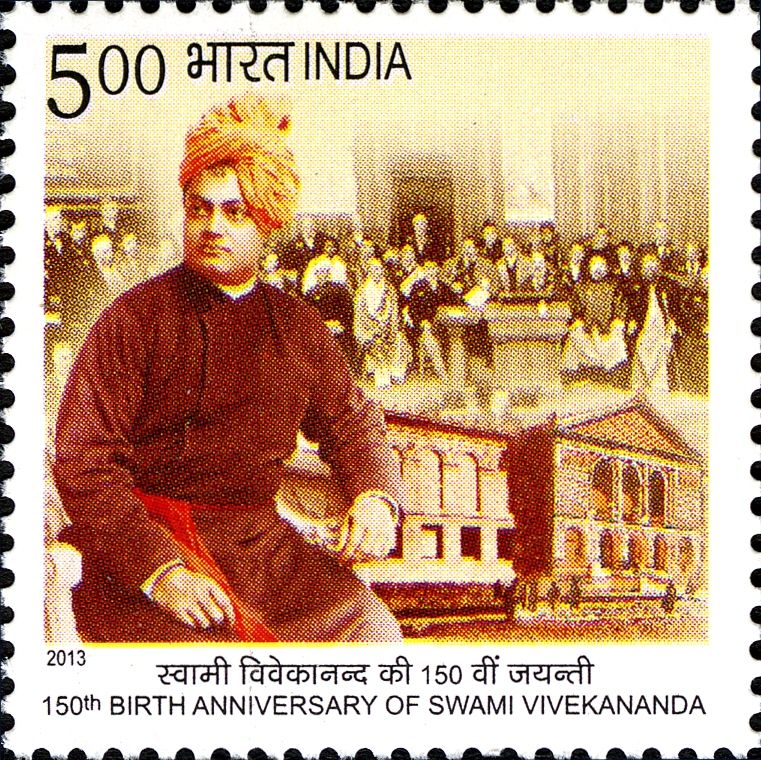
Vivekananda on a 2013 stamp of India

Posts of India and Sri Lanka issued several commemorative stamps of Vivekananda in 2013. Vivekananda was also featured on other stamps of India in 1963, 1993 and 2015 and of Sri Lanka in 1997. In 2018, India and Serbia issued joint stamps devoted to Vivekananda.

=== Vivek Express ===
In 2011—2013 Railway Budget, Indian Railways announced four pairs of new express trains on the Indian Railways network. These new trains were started as a tribute to Vivekananda on his 140th birth anniversary.

=== Public Notice 3 ===
To mark the anniversary of Swami Vivekananda's landmark address at the Chicago Art Institute, and in remembrance of the terrorist attacks at the World Trade Center and the Pentagon 108 years later on that very date, 11 September, Indian artist Jitish Kallat created Public Notice 3, a site-specific installation on the Art Institute's Woman's Board Grand Staircase.

On 28 January 2012, the Art Institute of Chicago, in conjunction with the Republic of India, reinstalled a plaque commemorating Vivekananda's landmark speech outside Fullerton Hall.

== In popular culture ==
=== Films ===
Bengali Swami Vivekananda has been the primary topic of many films, dramas ad folk-plays. Bengali film director Amar Mullick made two different movies: Swamiji (1949) and its adaptation in Hindi, Swami Vivekananda (1955). The film Swami Vivekananda (1955) is considered a "faithful and memorable documentation feature" on Vivekananda.

The Swami Vivekananda was released on 12 June 1998. The film was premiered on India's public service broadcaster Doordarshan on 15 August 1998 as a part of Doordarshan's celebration of 50th year of India's Independence. The film has been appreciated for blending the role of "eccentric middle-aged mystic, nominally a Brahmin priest, claiming nothing short of godhood role “of Paramahmsa very well with that of the“ young non-Brahmin agnostic modernist role" of Vivekananda.

In 2013, Utpal (Tutu) Sinha directed The Light: Swami Vivekananda which was a tribute to Vivekananda on his 150th anniversary of his birth. Indian American animator and laserist Manick Sorcar created a laser show, Swamiji, in honor of the anniversary.

Birieswar Vivekananda is a 1964 Indian Bengali-language film directed by Modhu Bose, starring Amaresh Das in the titular role. Indian filmmaker Bimal Roy made a documentary about Vivekananda, titled Life and Message of Swami Vivekananda, in the same year.

Sound of Joy, an Indian 3D-animated short film directed by Sukankan Roy depicts the spiritual journey of Vivekananda. It won the National Film Award for Best Non-Feature Animation Film in 2014.

=== Dramas ===
Bengali theatre group Lokkrishti staged a drama Biley to commemorate the birth anniversary. Bengali theatre actor Debshankar Haldar played the role of Swami Vivekananda in this drama. In 2013 Belgharia Shankhamala theatre group staged the drama Bireswar. The drama was written by Basab Dasgupta and directed by Debesh Chattopadhyay.
