= Swami Vivekananda Youth Employment Week =

2012 event in Gujarat, India

- Date: April 2012
- Location: Gujarat
- Organized by: Gujarat government
- Headed by: Narendra Modi
- Commemoration: Swami Vivekananda's 150th birth anniversary
- Website: www.narendramodi.in

Swami Vivekananda Youth Employment Week was a weeklong youth employment festival organized in Gujarat, India, in April 2012. During this week, Narendra Modi, Chief Minister of Gujarat, handed job appointment letters to 65,000 youths. The event was organized as a part of the 150th birth anniversary of Swami Vivekananda celebrations in the state.

== Selection process ==
Directorate of Employment and Training played a catalytic role by interacting with private sector industries on the job opportunities and communicating the same to the youths needing employment in the industries. This event, in particular, was planned from October 2011. The officers of Directorate of Employment & Training through aegis of CII, FICCI, GCII and GIDC identified 100,000 job opportunities in skilled fields. This information was communicated to the youth in search of jobs through print media, electronic media and publicity pamphlets and banners. This campaign was held from 15 to 31 November 2011. Prospective employers held interviews with the applicants for jobs in the industrial estates at the taluk and district level and came out with a first list of 76,843 out of 126,610 youths. The final list of 65,000 to be employed was prepared after holding final selection interviews.

== Event ==
In April 2012, the Gujarat government held "Swami Vivekananda Youth Employment Week" from 9 to 15 April 2012 in which they provided jobs to 65,000 youths of Gujarat. The Chief Minister of the state Narendra Modi himself handed over appointment letters to the candidates. This event was organized to celebrate the 150th birth anniversary of Swami Vivekananda.

In the inaugural speech, Modi discussed and analysed the issues of contemporary Indian society such as youth unemployment, unrest in society, attack on Indian cultures and so forth. He gave assurances that Gujarat government would work to support the people of Gujarat and help them to earn their living. He also commemorated the life, works and ideals of Swami Vivekananda, and said, "Through this campaign, the state government aims at motivating youths so that they imbibe Swamiji’s message, prove their inner strength and work for taking their country ahead."

== Controversies ==
In October 2012, Indian social activist Rohit Prajapati filed a Right to Information (RTI) application and wanted to learn the expenses spent specifically on this event. Previously, in the same year, Modi had criticized Indian National Congress President Sonia Gandhi for not revealing details of the expenses of her foreign travels. Another social activist Trupti Shah noted that Modi did not publish his travel expenditures during the Women Empowerment Sammelans organized in Gujarat in 2007. Prajapati, in his RTI application, asked 18 questions related to the April 2012 week of Modi and the Gujarat government. Later, he said that the government gave answers to all of his questions except for the one related to Modi's expenses. Prajapati also said, "It is obvious that some department must have incurred expenses or someone must have sponsored it. It is six months since I filed the RTI, but I am yet to get reply regarding the expenses. Modi had also travelled by helicopter to some places?"

== National Youth Day ==
Apart from the Youth Employment Week, the National Youth Day is also observed every year on January 12, marking the Birthday of Swami Vivekananda. Its observation was initiated from 1985 when the Government of India declared and issued orders to this effect.
