= 150th birth anniversary of Swami Vivekananda =

Indian Hindu monk

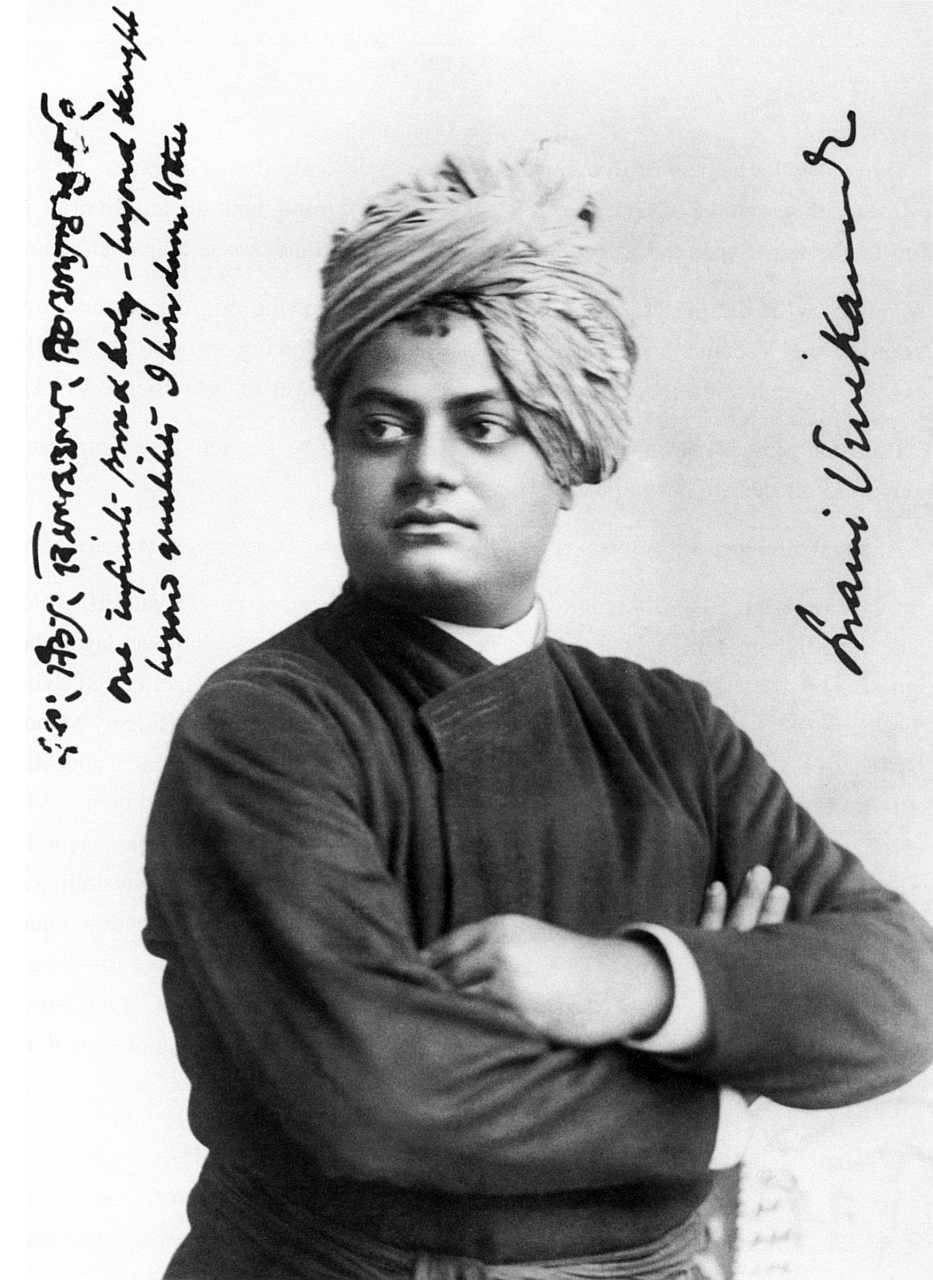
- Swami Vivekananda in Chicago in 1893
- Date: 1863–2013
- Location: Worldwide

Swami Vivekananda was an Indian Hindu monk. He was a key figure in the introduction of the Indian philosophies of Vedanta and Yoga to the western world. The 150th birth anniversary of Swami Vivekananda (12 January 2013) was celebrated all over India and in different countries in the world. Ministry of Youth Affairs & Sports of India decided to observe 2013 as the year of 150th Birth Anniversary of Swami Vivekananda. Year-long events and programs were organised by different branches of Ramakrishna Math, Ramakrishna Mission, central government and different state governments of India, education institutions, youth groups etc. Bengali film director Tutu (Utpal) Sinha made a film The Light: Swami Vivekananda as a tribute to Swami Vivekananda on his 150th birth anniversary. The movie was released on 23 August 2013.

== Government initiatives ==
- In 2011 Malaysian government introduced a postal stamp to mark the occasion.
- Ministry of Youth Affairs & Sports of India decided to observe 2013 as the year of 150th Birth Anniversary of Swami Vivekananda.
- The Union Human Resources and Development Ministry and the Central Board of Secondary Education (CBSE) of India asked all schools to celebrate the birth anniversary of Vivekananda in schools to renew the interests of school children in the works and ideals of Vivekananda. A senior CBSE educational official told in statement– "The NCERT officials said that the council is preparing a supplementary book containing the thoughts of 15 great thinkers of India. The expert committee for textbook development will endeavour to include names not included so far, subject to the load of syllabus and textbook material on children, remaining within acceptable limits".
- On 12 January 2013, a postal stamp was issued by Indian government.
- President of INDIA Shri Pranab Mukherjee released special commemorative coin set of Rs. 150 & Rs. 5 to commemorate the '150th Birth Anniversary of Swami Vivekananda' on 12 January 2013

== Political parties ==
Political parties of Dakshina Kannada district, Karnataka venerated Vivekananda at different functions and events across the city. Tamil Nadu Chief Minister Jayalalithaa told the life and teachings of Vivekananda has been a great inspiration to her, and she considers Vivekananda as her "political teacher". She sanctioned a fund of ₹20 million (US$210,000) on behalf of the Tamil Nadu government for the welfare of Vivekananda Cultural Centre of the state.

== World Congress of Religions 2012 ==
In 2012, a 3-day World Congress of Religions conference was organised by the Institute of World Religions (of the Washington Kali Temple), Burtonsville, Maryland, in association with the Council for A Parliament of World Religions, Chicago, Illinois to commemorate the 150th birthday of Swami Vivekananda.

In the official website of the event it was stated–

The event commemorates the 150th birth anniversary of India’s visionary monk, Swami Vivekananda, who addressed the Parliament of World’s Religions in Chicago in September 1893, passionately calling for both tolerance and universal acceptance as a path to eliminate the evils of sectarianism, bigotry and fanaticism and engage all the world’s religious and spiritual community leaders in efforts to forge a new global civil society.

== In popular media ==
A bilingual film, The Light: Swami Vivekananda was made in India as tribute to Swami Vivekananda on his 150th birth anniversary. The director of the film Tutu Sinha told in an interview– "I have directed serials like Trishna and Rajmahal. I have also directed the serial Sadhok Bamakhyapa up to its 1000th episode. I always wanted to make a film on Swamiji."

Bengali theatre group Lokkrishti staged a drama Biley to commemorate the birth anniversary. Bengali theatre actor Debshankar Haldar played the role of Swami Vivekananda in this drama.
