= Sayak Chakraborty =

Indian actor (born 1994)

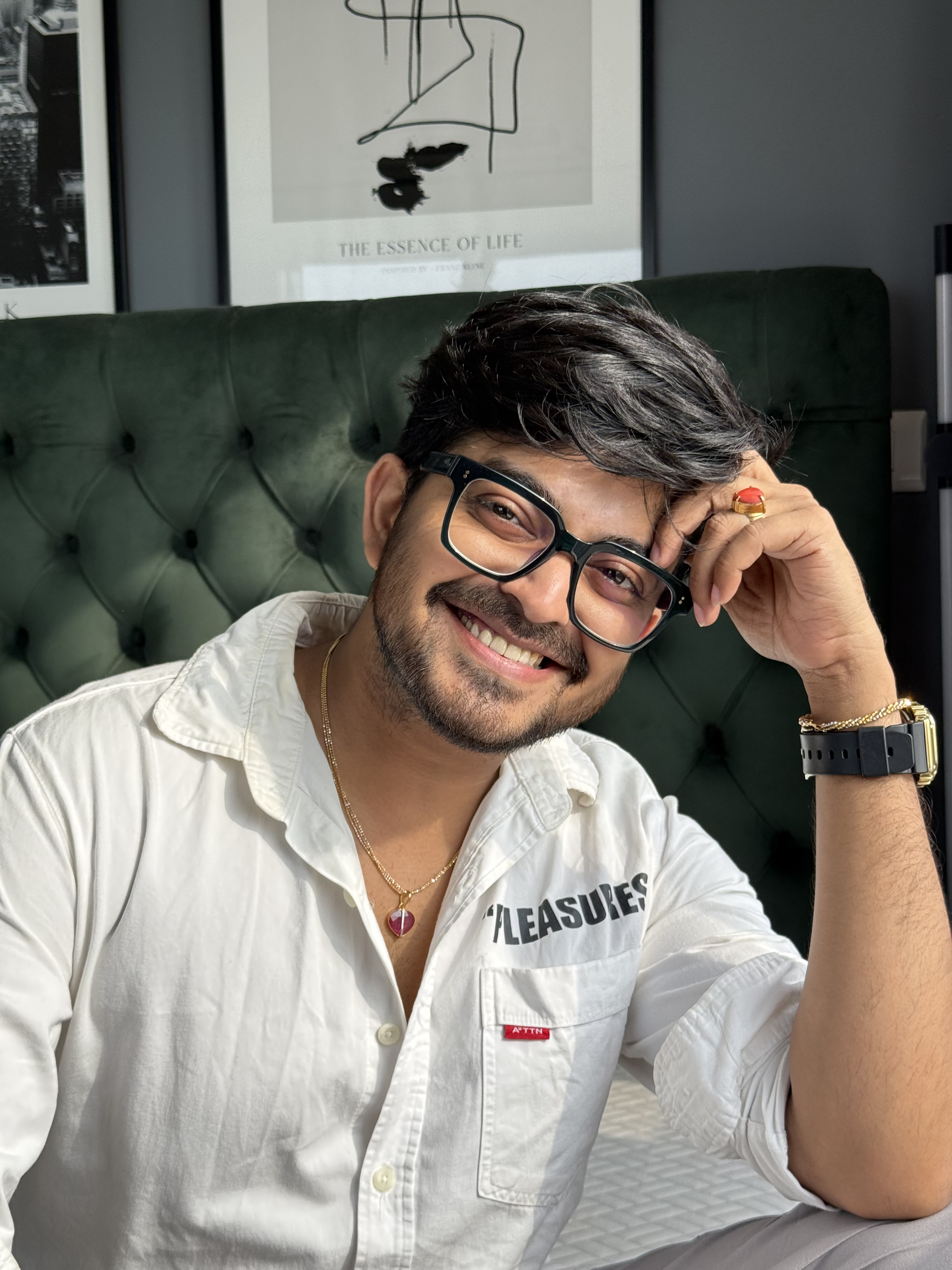
- Chakraborty in 2025
- Born: 27 September 1994 (age 32); Kolkata, West Bengal, India
- Education: Sonarpur Vidyapith
- Occupations: Actor; YouTuber
- Years active: 2008–present
- Known for: Karunamoyee Rani Rashmoni; Ami Sirajer Begum; Bigg Boss Bangla

Sayak Chakraborty ( born 27 September 1994) is an Indian actor and YouTuber who works in Bengali cinema. He is known for his portrayal of Krishna in the mythological television soap opera Mahaprabhu Sri Chaitanya and his role in Karunamoyee Rani Rashmoni, a historical drama soap aired on Zee Bangla. In 2025, he became the brand ambassador of Texllo Technology and Joarder Saree House. In mid-2026, Chakraborty joined reality television show Bigg Boss Bangla season 3.November 2026 he is set to start upcoming Star Jalsha television show Manashamangal,where he will play a prominent role

== Early life ==
Chakraborty was born on 27 September 1994 in Kolkata, West Bengal, into a middle-class Hindu family to parents mother Rekha Chakraborty and father Anupam Chakraborty. He grow up with his siblings, including brother Sabyasachi Chakraborty, and a sister, Pallavi Mukherjee. He completed his schooling from Sonarpur Vidyapith. From an early age, he developed an inclination towards the entertainment industry, eventually, starting his career in the acting world as a junior artist in 2008, before becoming a television actor and vlogger.

== Career ==
From 2006 to 2013, Chakraborty performed as a junior artist in various Bengali television serials and films. He is known for his portrayal as Krishna in the TV serial Mahaprabhu Sri Chaitanya, a mythological show, and Karunamoyee Rani Rashmoni, a historical drama on Zee Bangla. He worked in 27 consecutive TV serials as supporting cast, including The Light: Swami Vivekananda (2013). in his television career, in 2026 he participate as a contestant in the popular reality television show Bigg Boss Bangla (Season 3).

== Filmography and television ==
=== Films ===
Year	Title	Role	Ref.
2011	Faande Poriya Boga Kaande Re	Junior artist in "Emoner Cellphone" song	
2013	The Light: Swami Vivekananda	Young Swami Vivekananda	
2015	Guru Kripa	Pintu	
2022	Belashuru	Arka	

=== Television ===
Year	Title	Role	Channel	Ref.
2009–2010	Bou Kotha Kao	Junior artist	Star Jalsha	
2011	Megher Palok	Junior artist	Star Jalsha	
2013–2014	Boyei Gelo	Chandu's brother (Ranga da)	Zee Bangla	
2014	Sadhak Bamakhyapa	Ramgati	ETV Bangla	
2014	Hoyto Tomari Jonyo	Atanu	ETV Bangla	
2015–2016	Goyenda Ginni	Swarthak	Zee Bangla	
2015–2016	Aaj Aari Kal Bhab	Subhro	Star Jalsha	
2016–2017	Naagleela	Jagan	Colors Bangla	
2016	Maa Durga	Lord Laxman	Colors Bangla	
2017–2019	Mahaprabhu Shree Chaitanya	Lord Vishnu; Lord Rama; Lord Krishna; Lord Jagannath	Colors Bangla	
2017	Ki Kore Toke Bolbo	Ayush	Colors Bangla	
2018	Baksho Bodol	Rup	Zee Bangla	
2019	Mangalchandi	Narada	Colors Bangla	
2019–2020	Karunamoyee Rani Rashmoni	Mahendra Das	Zee Bangla	
2018–2019	Ami Sirajer Begum	Ashrafi	Star Jalsha	
2019–2020	Kone Bou	Bumba	Sun Bangla	
2019–2020	Kapalkundala	Ganesh (Nabakumar's brother)	Star Jalsha	
2020–2021	Mahapeeth Tarapeeth	Lord Krishna	Star Jalsha	
2020	Kadambini	Manmatha	Zee Bangla	
2021	Agnisikha	Raktim	Sun Bangla	
2021	Sanjher Baati	Garry	Star Jalsha	
2021–2022	Kanchi	Abhra	Aakash Aath	
2022	Mon Phagun	Sarthak	Star Jalsha	
2023	Ramprasad	Balaram	Star Jalsha	
2023	Shyama	Apu	Sun Bangla	
2024	Mongolmoyee Maa Shitala	Lord Vishnu	Sun Bangla	
2025	Chirosokha	Fidel (Vlogger)	Star Jalsha	
2025	Tui Amar Hero	Ritam	Zee Bangla	
2025	Rajrajeshwari Rani Bhabani	Raja Rajballabh Sen	Star Jalsha	
2026	Manasamangal	Coming soon	Star Jalsha	

=== Reality shows ===
Year	Title	Role	Channel	Notes	Ref.
2019	Didi No. 1	Participant	Zee Bangla	Winner	
2021	Didi No. 1	Participant	Zee Bangla		
2022	Didi No. 1	Participant	Zee Bangla	Winner	
2023	Ghore Ghore Zee Bangla	Celebrity home visit	Zee Bangla		
2026	Bigg Boss Bangla season 3	Contestant	Star Jalsha	13th place	

== Music videos ==
Year	Title	Role	Notes	Ref.
2016	"Ami Cholechi Tar Dake”	Lead	Bengali movie song	
2016	"Ki Ek Biroho Byathay”	Lead	Bengali movie song	
2017	"Tumar Xubax”	Male lead	Assamese	
2021	"Tere Bina"	Male lead	Hindi	
2021	"Yaadein Zaroori Hai	Male lead	Hindi	
2021	"Oliro Kotha Sune"	Male Lead	Bengali	
2022	"Yaadein Zaroori Hai"	Male Lead	Hindi	
2022	"Tor Adore"	Lead	Bengali & Hindi	
2022	"Tapa Tini”	Supporting cast	Bengali movie song	
2022	"Ki Mayay”	Supporting cast	Bengali movie song	
2023	"Ami Dur Hote Tomarei Dekhechi”	Lead	Bengali	
2023	"Do Lafzon Mein Likhdi”	Lead	Hindi	
2023	"Na Jane Kyun”	Lead	Hindi	
2023	"Bhalobashar Moton Bhalobasle”	Lead	Bengali	
2023	"Aankhon Hi Aankhon Mein”	Lead	Hindi	
2024	"Mon Amar"	Lead	Bengali	
2024	"Tomaro Asime"	Lead	Bengali	
2024	"Tomay Amay Mile”	Lead	Bengali	
2024	"Sokhi Bhabina Kahare Bole”	Lead	Bengali	
2024	"Tare Bole Bio”	Lead	Bengali	
2024	"Obujh Mon”	Lead	Bengali	
2024	"Elomelo Ichchera”	Lead	Bengali	
2024	"Ami Tomari Naam Gai”	Lead	Bengali	
2024	"Piya Tore Bin”	Lead	Bengali & Hindi	
2024	"Elo Ghorete Uma”	Lead	Bengali	
2025	"Ebhabei Bhalobeshe Jabo Tomake”	Lead	Bengali	
2025	"Cheyechhi Maa”	Supporting cast	Bengali	
2025	"Aaj Mon Cheyeche Ami Hariye Jabo”	Lead	Bengali	
2025	"Elore Dugga Maa”	Supporting cast	Bengali	

== Web series ==
Year	Title	Role	Platform	Notes	Ref.
2021	Jal †	2nd lead	Zee5	Unreleased	
2023	Institute of Isspecial Talents	Supporting cast	Hoichoi		

== Awards ==
Year	Award	Category	Result	Ref.
2020	Sonar Sansar Awards	Negative actor	Nominated	
2020	Calcutta Times Most Desirable Men	Popular Face in Television	Won	
2021	Wow Excellence Awards	Emerging Actor	Won	
2022	Bangla Hunt Award	Bangla Hunt Special Award for YouTube	Won	
2024	Tolly Cine Samman	Famous Vlogger (male)	Won	
2024	Indian Ministry of Culture and Bangla Hunt Award	Best Family Vlogger by Public Choice	Won	

== In the media ==
Chakraborty entered The Times of India's Most Desirable Men of 2020 at 11th position. In 2024, Chakraborty and Alokananda Guha posted content which jokingly lead people to believe they got married. In 2025, he became brand ambassador of Texllo Mobile, Joarder Saree House, Akansha Herbal, Tomay Sajabo Jotone, Paul Gems, and Parboni restaurant. In July 2025, Chakraborty had had to take a long break from his ongoing daily television soaps owing to his spondylitis and thyroid issues. In 2025, he uploaded photos on social media with actress Ayanna Chatterjee, which went viral as people speculated they had gotten married.

== Controversy ==
=== 2026 Olypub beef mix-up ===
On the evening of 30 January 2026, Chakraborty visited Olypub, a restaurant on Park Street, Kolkata, with friends Ananya Guha and Sukanta Kundu. There, he alleged that despite ordering mutton steak, he was served beef, a realization they claimed to have made only after a second plate arrived. He recorded and posted a video on social media showing a confrontation with the restaurant's waiter and manager, alleging a "deliberate attempt" to hurt his religious sentiments.

Following a complaint filed by Chakraborty at the Park Street police station, the police arrested the waiter, Sheikh Nasiruddin, under Section 299 of the Bharatiya Nyaya Sanhita (BNS) for hurting religious sentiments; subsequently, the waiter was denied bail. A debate ensued on social media, with some supporting Chakraborty and others criticizing him for targeting a service lapse. Afterward, Joyraj Bhattacharjee filed a complaint against Chakraborty, accusing him of attempting to incite a riot. Police reported that four complaints were lodged against Chakraborty within 72 hours, and a first information report (FIR) was registered against him.

Olypub issued a formal statement apologizing for the error, claiming it was a "a very serious but unintentional error". After the restaurant's apology, Chakraborty removed the videos from social media and announced his intention to withdraw his complaint against the waiter and the establishment. He expressed regret for his "negative" reaction, stating, "I don't want to get involved in this kind of controversy while making vlogs." However, legal experts noted that the charges against the waiter were non-compoundable and non-bailable, meaning a simple withdrawal request before the court might not automatically quash the case.

In June 2026, Chakraborty opened up about his struggle with mental health following the incident. He revealed that between January and March 2026, cyberbullying and a loss of friends had driven him to contemplate suicide. He cited the support of his family as helping him get through this difficult time.

=== Election expenditure ===
in September 2026, official election expenditure declarations submitted by the Bharatiya Janata Party (BJP) to the Election Commission of India revealed that Chakraborty had received ₹2.5 lakh. The payment recorded between March and May 2026, was categorised under campaign and promotional content for the 2026 assembly elections. The disclosure triggered widespread public discussion and speculation on social media with critics linking the financial transaction to an earlier controversy in January 2026 involving Chakraborty at Olypub.

==== Response and clarification ====
In September 2026, Chakraborty Amid mounting backlash and allegations connecting the Olypub incident to the BJP funding, Chakraborty issued a detailed statement rejecting the claims. He clarified that the 2.5 lakh payment had no relation to the Olypub controversy, describing the restaurant incident as an isolated, spontaneous movement. Chakraborty stated that he was later approached by multiple political parties to create digital content. He chose to produce promotional material for the BJP because the and it’s supporters had stood by him during the earlier backlash. According to Chakraborty, his campaign work involved creating technical explainers, commentary on national events, end congratulatory congratulatory message, asserting that the compensation was earned legitimately through professional content creation.
