= Bireswar (drama) =

Bengali-language drama

- A scene of the drama depicting Swami Vivekananda and other brother disciples
- Written by: Basab Dasgupta
- Original language: Bengali
- Subject: Life of Swami Vivekananda
- Setting: India

Premiere
- Date premiered: 2013 by Belgharia Shankhamala

Bireswar (2013) is an experimental drama produced by Belgharia Shankhamala theatre group. The eventful life of Swami Vivekananda has been depicted in this drama.

== Synopsis ==
The drama attempts to cover the whole life of Swami Vivekananda.

== Credits ==
- Writer: Basab Dasgupta
- Direction and stage composition: Debesh Chattopadhyay
- Audio direction: Sumantra Sengupta
- Music: Srikanto Acharya and Sreejit Bhattacharya

== See also ==
- Biley
