= The Light: Swami Vivekananda =

- Theatrical poster
- Directed by: Utpal (Tutu) Sinha
- Screenplay by: J. Misra; Ashok Ranjan Chakraborty
- Based on: Life of Swami Vivekananda
- Starring: Deep Bhattacharya; Gargi Roy Choudhury; Premankur Chattopadhyay; Courtney Stephens; Biswajit Chakraborty; Piyali Mitra; Sayak Chakraborty; Archita Sahu
- Cinematography: Utpal (Tutu) Sinha
- Edited by: Sanjib Dutta
- Music by: Nachiketa and Dr. Haricharan Verma
- Production company: Tri Colour Productions
- Release date: 1 February 2013 (Kolkata)
- Running time: 117 minutes
- Country: India
- Languages: Bengali, Hindi

The Light: Swami Vivekananda (2013) is a bilingual (Bengali and Hindi) film directed by Utpal (Tutu) Sinha and produced by Tri Colour productions private limited. The film is based on the life and teaching of Swami Vivekananda. The film was a tribute to Vivekananda on the 150th anniversary of his birth. The film was dubbed in 18 languages.

Deep Bhattacharya played the role of Swami Vivekananda, whom director Tutu Sinha first saw in a Bengali drama. Premankur Chattopadhyay and Gargi Roy Chowdhury played the characters of Ramakrishna Paramahamsa and Sarada Devi respectively.

== Synopsis ==
The eventful life of Swami Vivekananda has been captured in this film. The film shows the transition from young Narendra Nath Datta to world preacher Swami Vivekananda. Different events from his life starting from childhood days to meeting with the mystic saint Ramakrishna Paramahamsa at Dakshineswar, Vivekananda's travel to Northern India, travel to the West (America, Europe), meeting with Sister Nivedita, and his works in India have been captured, thereby building his journey from being Narendranath to Vivekananda in bits and pieces.

== Cast ==
- Deep Bhattacharya as Swami Vivekananda
- Sayak Chakraborty as Swami Vivekananda's childhood (biley)
- Gargi Roy Choudhury as Sarada Devi
- Premankur Chakraborty as Ramakrishna
- Courtney Stephens as Sister Nivedita
- Biswajit Chakraborty as Vishwanath Datta (Vivekananda's father)
- Piyali Mitra as Bhuvaneswari Devi (Vivekananda's mother)
- Archita Sahu as Moina Bai
- Sofia Mónica Bordalo Furreta Bento as the American wife
- Eduardo Jorge Gonçalves Bento as the police officer
- Stephanie Furreta Bento as the American child
- Kevin Furreta Bento as the American child

== Production ==
=== Background ===
This film was director Tutu Sinha's first work in big screen, before that he mainly worked as an ad filmmaker and television director. In an interview, Sinha told– "I have directed serials like Trishna and Rajmahal. I have also directed the serial Sadhok Bamakhyapa up to its 1000th episode. I always wanted to make a film on Swamiji."

=== Making ===
The film was shot in different places of West Bengal like Kolkata and in Odisha like Rairangpur, Similipal etc. Director Tutu Sinha had to travel all over India for the research work of this film. The events of Vivekananda's life in Rajasthan was recreated in Odisha. The scenes of Vivekananda's lectures at Parliament of World's Religions, Chicago in September 1893 was shot at Kolkata Town Hall.

=== Casting ===
Actress speaks

Sarada Ma was one [of] the most emancipated women of her times. The cinematography by Tutu is awesome and I feel the film will attract viewers not just from Bengal but beyond as well.

— Gargi Roy Chowdhury on her character

Mainly theatre actors and actresses were taken in this film.

- Deep Bhattacharya played the character of Swami Vivekananda. Director Sinha watched a drama of a Bengali theatre group named Sambed where he found Bhattacharya.
- Gargi Roy Chowdhury played the role of Sarada Devi of young age. There was not any image of Swarada Devi available during her youth. The production team used computer applications to back-compose and find out how Sarada Devi might look during her youth. After the study, they found Bengali film and television actress Gargi Roy Chowdhury suitable for the character. Roy Chowdhury told about acting as Sarada Devi– "I am mighty happy to portray one of the most liberated women of all times"
- Premankur Chattopadhyay, who is also a theatre actor, played the role of Ramakrishna Paramahamsa. Chattopadhyay told he would be indebted to the director forever for giving him opportunity to play the character in this film. He also told– "I can't explain how it all felt as I mouthed lines like 'Truth is one; only It is called by different names. All people are seeking the same Truth.' I am grateful director Tutu Sinha could think of me as Ramakrishna"
- Sayak Chakraborty played the role of Vivekananda's childhood. This was Sayak's debut film.
- California based actress Courtney Stephens played the character of Sister Nivedita.
- Archita Sahu played the role of Moina bai, a dancer at the court of Ajit Singh of Khetri. According to the director, Sahu was "just right" for the role of Moina bai.

== Soundtrack ==
The music launch of the film took place in January 2013 at Rotary Sadan, Kolkata. There were 14 songs in the film's music album. The music of the film was composed by Nachiketa Chakraborty and Dr. Haricharan Verma and the songs were sung by Ajay Chakraborty, Suresh Wadkar, Kavita Krishnamurthy, Nachiketa Chakraborty, Subhankar Bhaskar, and Javed Ali.

All music is composed by Nachiketa Chakraborty and Dr. Haricharan Verma.

No.	Title	Lyrics	Singer(s)	Length
1.	"Janani Janmabhumi Swargadapi Gariyashi" (Sanskrit)	Valmiki	Nachiketa Chakraborty and chorus
2.	"Shree Guru Charan Saroj (Hanuman Chalisa)" (Awadhi)	Tulsidas	Nazia Alam
3.	"Dui Hridoyer Nodi" (Bengali)	Rabindranath Tagore	Subhankar Bhaskar
4.	"Dukh Me Sumiran Sab Kare" (Hindi)	Kabir	Suresh Wadkar
5.	"Mon Cholo Nijo Niketone I" (Bengali)	Ajay Udayanath Pakrashi	Subhankar Bhaskar
6.	"Maa Korali Kali" (Bengali)		Ajay Chakraborty
7.	"Satyer Pother Bijoy Rothe" (Bengali)		Nachiketa Chakraborty
8.	"Allah Tu Kitna Hai Mehrban" (Hindi)		Javed Ali
9.	"Pile Pile Re Mann" (Hindi)		Suresh Wadkar
10.	"Kaise Kahu Maan Ki Batiya" (Hindi)		Kavita Krishnamurthy
11.	"Parbhu Ji More Aaugan Chit Na Dharo" (Hindi)	Surdas	Kavita Krishnamurthy
12.	"Mon Cholo Nijo Niketone II" (Bengali)	Ajay Udayanath Pakrashi	Subhankar Bhaskar
13.	"Hey Prabhu Hey Ishwar" (Hindi)		Nachiketa Chakraborty
14.	"Nahi Suryo Nahi Jyoti" (Bengali)	Swami Vivekananda	Nachiketa Chakraborty and chorus

== Release ==
Both the director and the producer of the film wanted to release the film in 2012. But, because the post-production word, they could not release it in that year. Next, they targeted to release the film on 11 January 2013, the day before Swami Vivekananda's 150th birth anniversary. But they could not release the film on that day either. Finally, the film was scheduled to release on 23 August 2013. The film's premier was organised at Nandan, Kolkata. Many state governments have declared this movie as tax free in their states like Maharashtra, Gujarat and West Bengal.

== Reception ==
The film garnered mixed reviews from critics. The Times of India rated the film 3 and a half out of 5 stars and stated the film "goes to show again that some films are still made in Tollywood, which do not get any hype, yet are good works of art in their own right." In this review, the acting of Deep Bhattacharya was highly appreciated. Washington Bangla Radio on Internet wrote in their review: "Premankur and Deep have proven in the film that theatrical experience can be a great asset for actors".

== See also ==
- Swami Vivekananda (1998 film)
