= Biley (drama) =

Bengali play

Biley বিলে (बिली)
- Written by: Ujjwal Chattopadhyay

Premiere
- Date: 2012 by Lokakrishti

Biley (Note: The original title is in Bengali. Here the common English spelling of Swami Vivekananda's nickname has been used.) or Bilay (Bengali: বিলে) is a 2012 Bengali drama created by Bengali theatre group Lokkrishti, This is a dramatisation of the life and works of Swami Vivekananda. Debshankar Haldar played the role of Swami Vivekananda, while debutant Guddu (Shuvam Das) played the role of Biley. Phalguni Chattopadhyay directed this drama and Ujjwal Chattopadhyay was the playwright.

The drama received an appreciative critical response, with one review in Bengali newspaper Anandabazar Patrika calling it a remarkable step in Bengali theatre (though they also criticized the choreography, music, characters and some of the acting).

== Plot ==
Biley attempts to cover the whole life of Swami Vivekananda. In order to cover eventful life of Vivekananda in a narrative form within the two-hour span of the drama, the production employed the technique of flashbacks during a conversation between Vivekananda as an adult, and Vivekananda as a child. Different events from his life starting from childhood days to meeting with the mystic saint Ramakrishna at Dakshineswar, Vivekananda's travel to the West, meeting with Sister Nivedita, and his works in India have been captured in flashback, thereby building his journey from being Narendranath to Vivekananda in bits and pieces.

In this drama, the director has tried to capture the humanly aspects of Vivekananda. Some unpleasant questions are asked, and bitter issues raised throughout the drama. Young Narndranath says directly to Ramakrishna that he had used his wife Sarada Devi, sacrificing her womanhood for the sake of divine worship. Vivekananda confesses that even a Sannyasi feels frustrated and depressed, feels sorrow and sheds tears. Vivekananda gets irritated multiple times by the questions of Nivedita, and faces conflicts between religion and politics.

== Making ==
The Bengali drama was an initiative taken by Lokkrishti to commemorate 150th birth anniversary of Swami Vivekananda. The play was written by Ujjwal Chattopadhyay. It took him one year to finish the screenplay.

== Credits ==
=== Cast ===
- Debshankar Haldar as Vivekananda (Narendranath Datta)
- Guddu (Shuvam Das) as Biley (child Narendranath)
- Phalguni Chattopadhyay as Ramakrishna
- Rumki Chattopadhyay as Sarada Devi
- Monalisa as Sister Nivedita

=== Production ===
- Theatre group: Lokkrishti
- Director: Phalguni Chattopadhyay
- Playwright: Ujjwal Chattopadhyay
- Stage decoration: Soumik and Piyali
- Choreographer: Monalisa
- Light: Sudip Sanyal
- Background music: Arup Ratan

== Reception ==
In the Bengali newspaper Anandabazar Patrika's review, the drama has been described as a remarkable step in Bengali theatre. Debshankar's acting as Narendranath Datta has been appreciated. Phalguni Chattopadhyay as Ramakrishna applauded too. Rumki Chattopadhyay's acting as Sarada Devi has been little criticized for non-seriousness and acting of Monalisa as Sister Nivedita has been remarked as unnatural. Guddu as you child Vivekananda has been highly applauded.

The choreography of the play has been remarked as improper and irrelevant for the play. The music has sometimes slowed down the pace of the drama and it has also been remarked that the characters Mahendralal Sarkar and Girish Chandra Ghosh could not be portrayed properly.

== See also ==
- Bireswar
