= Swami Sadananda =

Hindu sage

- Swami Sadananda, the direct monastic disciple of Swami Vivekananda
- Born: Sharat Chandra Gupta; 6 January 1865; Calcutta, Bengal Presidency, India
- Died: 18 February 1911 (aged 46); Calcutta, Bengal Presidency, India
- Other names: Gupta Maharaj
- Occupation: Monk
- Known for: Spiritual work

Swami Sadananda (6 January 1865 - 18 February 1911), born Sharat Chandra Gupta, popularly known as Gupta Maharaj in the Ramakrishna Order, was a direct monastic disciple of Swami Vivekananda. He was the first disciple according to some sources. He took his monastic vows and joined Baranagar Math to serve the other disciples of Sri Ramakrishna in 1888–89 and subsequently joined the Belur Math when it was established. He was one of the leaders of early Ramakrishna Mission in its relief work. One of his significant contributions was providing relief to the citizens of Calcutta during the plague epidemic of 1898–99. He traveled to Japan in 1903. His later days were spent in company of Sister Nivedita as her protector and guide. His notable contribution in the later part of his life was preaching the message of Swami Vivekananda, especially among youth.

== Early years ==
Sharat Chandra Gupta was born in Calcutta on 6 January 1865. In 1868, his parents migrated to Jaunpur, near Varanasi. His father's name was Jadunath Gupta. Being brought up in North India, Sharat Chandra developed proficiency in the Hindi and Urdu languages, although his mother tongue was Bengali. His elder brother Adharchandra Gupta had renounced worldly life and become a monk. Sharat Chandra possessed a strong physique and a generous nature. He accepted a job with the railways and was posted as a station master in Hathras railway station. There he first met the wandering monk who would become his guru.

== With Swami Vivekananda ==
Sometime in September 1888 Swami Vivekananda, then an unknown itinerant monk, was travelling from Vrindavan to Haridwar and decided to take a train from Hathras. While he was waiting for the train, the station master of Hathras, Sharat Chandra Gupta, took notice of him and invited him to his quarters. In the words of Swami Virajananda, Sharat Chandra was enchanted by Swami Vivekananda's fascinating appearance and particularly his "devilish eyes". Another account asserts that Sharat Chandra Gupta saw the monk sitting in a railway compartment and, being captivated by the bright eyes of the latter, entreated him to get down and be his guest as he had dreamed of those eyes. When Swami Vivekananda had asked Sharat as to what he had to offer as food to the guest, the latter replied quoting from a Persian poem, "Oh Beloved, you have come to my house, I shall prepare the most delicious dish for you with the flesh of my heart." When Swami was about to take his leave, he initiated Sharat Chandra on the latter's request. Sharat Chanadra accompanied Swami Vivekananda in his journey, and together they traveled to Rishikesh. The journey was strenuous for Sharat Chandra and at one point Swami Vivekananda carried his belongings, including his heavy boots, which Sadananda remembered throughout his life. They had to give up the plan of further travel owing to illness and returned together to Hathras. From there, Swami Vivekananda went back to Baranagar monastery and Sharat Chandra Gupta resigned and joined the monastery seven months later. This time he got the company of Swami Vivekananda for twelve months. He took his monastic vows and was named as Swami Sadananda. While Swami Vivekananda had been travelling all over India and abroad, Swami Sadananda, except for brief travels, stayed in the monastery in Calcutta. There is at least one letter addressed to Sadananda, from Ghazipur, in which Swami Vivekananda had enquired about Sadananda's spiritual practices and advised him on leading a pious life. During his stay in America, Swami Vivekananda enquired about Sadananda in some of his letters written to his brother disciples. In another letter where Swami Vivekananda narrated his vision for an organization, he wanted Swami Sadananda to become the librarian of the monastery. Swami Vivekananda returned to India in January 1897. Sadananda had gone to welcome him in Madras and was part of a vast crowd that had gathered. But his master still spotted him in the crowd and invited him to sit beside himself in the carriage. In March 1897, Swami Vivekananda sent Swami Ramakrishnananda to set up a monastery in Madras and Swami Sadananda was sent to assist him. Shortly after reaching Madras Sadananda was bitten by a dog but recovered from it. In 1897 Swami Sadananda joined Swami Vivekananda in his tour to Northern India. Swami Sadananda wrote an article in the issue of Brahmavadin in January 1898 describing Swami's visit to Khetri. He also traveled together with Swami Vivekananda and Sister Nivedita to Almora in 1898.

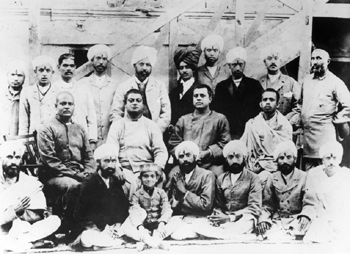
With Swami Vivekananda in Kashmir. Sitting beside the Swami on the left is Sadananda

Sadananda was present in Belur Math when Swami Vivekananda died on 4 July 1902. Swami Sadananda used to refer to himself as Vivekananda's dog, out of respect and love.

== Monastic life ==
Sadananda introduced the term Maharaj to address the monks, which became the accepted form of address in the Ramakrishna Order. Sadananda was deft in service. He served the other inmates of the monastery. He also served an ailing Balaram Bose, the direct householder disciple of Sri Ramakrishna, when the latter was in his deathbed. In April 1890 Sadananda went to Benares and stayed with Swami Vivekananda in the garden house of Pramadadas Mitra, living a life of austere spiritual practices. He also nursed back an ailing Swami Abhedananda and stayed with the latter in Jhusi, near Allahabad and studied and practised Vedanta under his tutelage. In 1892 when the monastery was shifted to Alambazar and was renamed as Alambazar Math Swami Sadananda worked hard for managing the transition. During the initial days, Swami Sadananda was much inconvenienced owing to his lack of knowledge in Bengali. However, Swami Saradananda helped him in overcoming his troubles with the language and the rigorous disciplines of a monastic life. Owing to recurring health problems he stayed for sometime with his parents and on recovering his health returned to Alambazar Math. After Swami Vivekananda came back to India, Swami Sadananda was sent to Madras along with Swami Ramakrishnananda, and they stayed in the Ice House of Biligiri. However, he came back and later traveled with Swami Vivekananda to Almora, probably because he did not prefer to stay in Madras. After returning to Calcutta from his Kashmir trip, Swami Vivekananda had deputed Swami Sadananda to the task of looking after Sister Nivedita. Swami Sadananda stayed in her house on Bosepara Lane in Baghbazar. According to the biographer of Sister Nivedita, this duty was entrusted upon Swami Sadananda because of his strict discipline resulting from his military background. In this account the biographer refers to Sadananda's activities as, He slept in a room which opened independently near the front entrance;he worked and ate his meals alone there;he looked after the plants;and as he worked he sang joyfully, "My Lord, I love thee, I adore thee." In the evening he insisted that Nivedita should stop her work and come down to the courtyard, and then he would tell her wonderful stories of the Ramayana. Sadananda made her aware of the customs of India through the stories of Mahabharata, which he recounted to her. He was also instrumental in introducing Sister Nivedita to the general populace of Baghbazar and nearby areas, which facilitated her work and helped to gain the trust of the local people. Swami Sadananda was also present at the time of death of Swami Yogananda. Swami Vivekananda had entrusted him the responsibility of supervisor of the plague relief work, which started in March 1899 in Calcutta. Swami Vivekananda had drafted a plague manifesto, which Swami Sadananda and Sister Nivedita distributed to the greater part of the population of the affected city. He led a group of volunteer work, mostly youth, who were inspired by the ideals of Swami Vivekananda. Swami Sadananda did not undertake any major work after Swami Vivekananda's death and remained a local guardian of Sister Nivedita and a preacher of his master's ideals, especially among the youth.

== Character ==
According to Life of Swami Vivekananda by His Eastern and Western Disciples, Swami Sadananda's whole character may be summed up in three words, Sweetness, Sincerity and Manliness. Another characteristic trait of Swami Sadananda was his capacity to love and serve others and to solicit love from others. Swami Sadananda was a daredevil, much in line with what Swami Vivekananda preferred his disciples to be. During his stay in Khetri with Swami Vivekananda, he mounted on an unruly horse and tamed it, which was much appreciated by Swami himself. Similarly, in Almora he once rode the most spirited horse and made it submissive.

=== Service as ideal ===
Swami Sadananda had adopted service as the primary means of worship, as directed by his master. He started his life of service by serving the monks and brother disciples of Swami Vivekananda in Baranagar and Alambazar monastery. He helped Swami Ramakrishnananda in establishing the monastery of Ramakrishna order in Madras. His zeal to serve the poor was evident in his plague relief work in Calcutta. He helped Sister Nivedita in serving Gopaler Ma, when the latter was ill. He also served Ramakrishna Mission in its plague relief work in Bhagalpur in 1904.

== Later Days ==
After the demise of Swami Vivekananda, Swami Sadananda began devoting time towards preaching the former's ideals, especially among the youth. He traveled to Japan in 1903 together with Bramhachari Amulya (later Swami Shankarananda). He accompanied Sister Nivedita in some of her travels to Mumbai and South India in 1902. Sadananda helped Nivedita in running Vivekananda Students' Home for a year and took the young boys to trips to the Himalayas. In 1904, he, together with Sister Nivedita, Jagadish Chandra Bose, Rabindranath Tagore, Sister Christine, Jadunath Sarkar etc. visited Bodh Gaya. Sadananda also went to Nalanda and Rajgir. Later he went to Bodh Gaya accompanying Mrs. Charlotte Sevier. In 1909, he stayed for sometime in the house of Sureswar Sen in Bishnupur, Bankura and inspired the family with the ideals of Sri Ramakrishna and Swami Vivekananda. The Holy Mother Sri Sarada Devi also stayed several times in the house of Sureswar Sen. Sen's younger brother Basiswar Sen, a renowned scientist, became a devoted follower of Swami Sadananda. Sadananda was afflicted with diabetes and also suffered from asthma. He was confined to bed for around two years. The Holy Mother Sri Sarada Devi came to visit him during his illness on 25 November 1910.

When Swami Sadananda was ill and was in his deathbed, Basiswar Sen and his cousin nursed him diligently. Swami Sadananda died on 18 February 1911, in Calcutta. An article in Prabuddha Bharata was written as an obituary to him which stated, "There was no work so hard, no difficulty so insurmountable, no word of command so impracticable, that he could not carry into effect for the sake of Swami Vivekananda."

== Contribution ==
Swami Sadananda played an important role in the early history of the Ramakrishna movement through his twin ideals of service and renunciation. He was one of the leaders of Ramakrishna Mission in rendering service to the poor and affected in the early days. He helped Swami Ramakrishnananda in establishing the Ramakrishna Math in Madras. Sadananda played a leading role in carrying out plague relief activities in Calcutta in 1898–99. As part of his efforts to eradicate the disease, he even cleaned the streets and slums along with a group of volunteers and coordinated the relief effort. He also rendered valuable service in the plague relief operations in Bhagalpur in 1904. He also helped in shaping the ideals of Sister Nivedita and in her work to promote education among Indian women by familiarizing her with the traditional customs of India, by introducing her to the local people and by bringing the first three girls who joined her school. Sister Nivedita acknowledged in her letter to Sara Bull that Swami Sadananda was her greatest strength in her dealings with children of the school. She also acknowledged in a letter that whatever success she achieved, she owed it to the inspiration and strength of Swami Sadananda. He searched for and found several poor children for Nivedita's school. Even after Sister Nivedita formally relinquished her association with Ramakrishna Order owing to her political activities, Swami Sadananda remained to take care of her. Also, he took care of the students of the Vivekananda Students' Home, which Sister Nivedita had established, became the teacher and mentor of the students and took them out on field trips to the Himalayas.

== See also ==
- Swami Achalananda
- Swami Bodhananda
- Swami Kalyanananda
- Swami Nischayananda
- Swami Prakashananda
- Swami Shuddhananda
- Swami Swarupananda
- Swami Vimalananda
- Swami Virajananda

== External sources ==
- Monastic Disciples of Swami Vivekananda, by Swami Abjajananda, published by Advaita Ashrama, Mayavati, 2003, ISBN 9788175052468
