= Ramakrishna Mission Sevashrama =

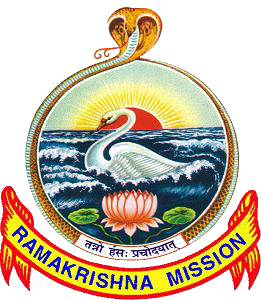
- Emblem
- Type: Religious organisation
- Headquarters: India
- Coordinates: 27.572055°N 77.694214°E
- Affiliations: Neo-Vedanta

Ramakrishna Mission Sevashrama is a branch of Ramakrishna Math and Ramakrishna Mission involved in providing humanitarian, healthcare, education and relief services to poor and needy through the universal principle of serving "God in man", based on the motto, Atmano Moksartham Jagat Hitaya Cha, which was propounded by Swami Vivekananda.

== List of Sevashramas ==
The oldest Sevashramas were Ramakrishna Mission Home of Service, in Varanasi, established by Kedarnath Moullik (Swami Achalananda) and Charu Chandra Das (Swami Subhananda), the two monastic disciples of Swami Vivekananda in 1900, Ramakrishna Mission Sevashrama, Kankhal, established by Swami Kalyanananda and Swami Nischayananda, the two monastic disciples of Swami Vivekananda in 1901, Ramakrishna Mission Sevashram in Vrindavan, established under Babu Jajneswar Chunder with his own son and Bramachari Harendra Nath of Belur Math in 1907, Ramakrishna Mission Sevashrama Allahabad, established by Swami Vijnanananda in 1910.

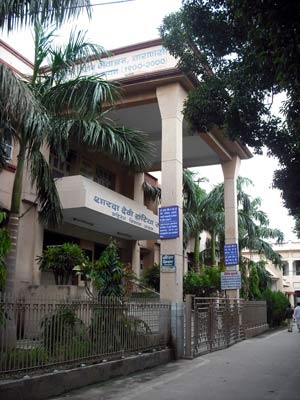
Ramakrishna Mission Home of Service, Varanasi

Subsequently, other centers were established in different places which include - Ramakrishna Mission Sevashrama Silchar in Assam,

- Ramakrishna Mission Sevashrama Muzaffarpur, Bihar,
- Ramakrishna Mission T.B Sanatorium Ranchi,
- Ramakrishna Mission Sevashrama Calicut,
- Ramakrishna Mission Sevashrama Lukhnow,
- Ramakrishna Mission Sevashrama Bankura,
- Ramakrishna Mission Sevashrama Contai,
- Ramakrishna Mission Sevashrama Garbeta,
- Ramakrishna Mission Sarada Sevashrama Jayrambati,
- Ramakrishna Mission Seva Pratishthan in Kolkata, and
- Ramakrishna Mission Sevashrama Tamluk.

Centers in Bangladesh include Dhaka (founded in 1899), Barisal (1904), Narayanganj (1909), Baliati at Manikganj (1910), Sylhet (1916), Chittagong (1921), Faridpur (1921), Habiganj (1921), Mymensingh (1922), Dinajpur (1923), Bagerhat (1926), and Comilla (1936).

== Work undertaken ==
The primary work undertaken by all Sevashramas is in the area of providing basic and advanced healthcare facilities to poor and needy at affordable costs, through the hospitals under their wings. All sevashramas work as their key principle service to the mankind irrespective of religion, caste and creed, in line with the philosophy of Vedanta of looking upon every human being as the manifestation of the divine as propounded by Sri Ramakrishna and Swami Vivekananda. In addition some Sevashramas also offer educational, humanitarian (like relief and rehabilitation) and spiritual services.

== Vrindavan centre ==
The Ramakrishna Mission Sevashram in Vrindavan, established in 1907, operates a 300-bed multi-super-specialty hospital, a School of Nursing, a temple, library, auditorium, and gaushala on its campus at Ramakrishna Marg, Vrindavan.

In March 2026, President Draupadi Murmu inaugurated the Nand Kishor Somani Oncology Block at the Sevashram on 20 March 2026, enhancing cancer care facilities available to the Mathura-Vrindavan region. Speaking at the inauguration, the President said that the Ramakrishna Mission stands as a symbol of the confluence of spiritual consciousness and humanitarian service, and that medical institutions driven by a spirit of service instil hope, confidence and dignity in the lives of patients and their families.
