= Swami Virajananda =

Indian Hindu disciple (1873–1951)

Virajananda
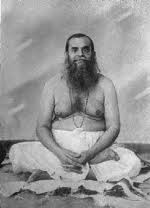
- Virajananda, a direct monastic disciple of Vivekananda and sixth President of the Ramakrishna Order

Personal life
- Born: Kalikrishna Bose; 10 June 1873 Calcutta, Bengal Presidency, British India
- Died: 30 May 1951 (aged 77) Belur Math, Belur, West Bengal, Republic of India

Religious life
- Religion: Hinduism
- Philosophy: Vedanta

Religious career
- Teacher: Sarada devi
- Predecessor: Swami Shuddhananda
- Successor: Swami Shankarananda
- Disciples: Swami Gahanananda Pravrajika Mokshaprana Pravrajika Shraddhaprana and others.

Swami Virajananda (10 June 1873 – 30 May 1951), born Kalikrishna Bose, was an initiated disciple of Sarada Devi and the sixth president of the Ramakrishna Order. Born as the son of Trailokyanath Bose and Nishadkalidevi, Virajananda was the first person to join the Ramakrishna Order after the direct disciples of Ramakrishna. In 1897, he was initiated into sannyasa by Vivekananda. From 1899 onward he served in Advaita Ashrama, Mayavati and became its president in 1906. He is recognised as a monastic disciple of Vivekananda.

Along with Swarupananda, Virajananda played a great role in popularising the monthly magazine of the order, Prabuddha Bharata. He was also responsible for successful completion of compilation and publishing of The Complete Works of Swami Vivekananda. He then edited and published a biography of Vivekananda in 1906 under the title The Life of Swami Vivekananda by his Eastern and Western Disciples. He was appointed the president of the Advaita Ashrama at Mayavati in 1913. In 1934, he became the General Secretary of the Ramakrishna Order. In 1938, he became the 6th President of the Ramakrishna Mission. He was the main source of inspiration behind the founding of two educational institutes of that mission, known as Vidyamandir and Sarada Pith.

== Pre-monastic life ==
Kalikrishna, as he was called in his pre-monastic life, was born on 10 June 1873 to Trailokyanath Bose and Nishadkali Devi on the Hindu festival day of bathing festival (snan yatra) of Jagannath. He had his early education from Hembabu's training academy and passed his matriculation from Ripon School in 1890. He was adept in extracurricular activities like handicrafts, fine arts, cooking and gardening from an early age. He was inspired by his friend Khagendranath, later Vimalananda, a disciple of Vivekananda, to lead a spiritual life. He also had a group of young friends who later became renunciates and who also joined the Ramakrishna order. Among them were Sudhir Chandra Chakravarty (Swami Shuddhananda), Sushil Chandra Chakravarty (Swami Prakashananda), Govinda Shukul (Swami Atmananda) and Haripada Chatterjee (Swami Bodhananda). Kalikrishna joined Ripon college and came in contact with Ram Chandra Datta, one of the foremost householder disciples of Ramakrishna, and the founder of Kankurgachi Yogodyan. He was also intimate with Mahendranath Gupta or M and another prominent householder disciple of Ramakrishna, who was at that time a professor of English at Ripon college. M inspired him to visit Baranagar Math and meet the direct monastic disciples of Ramakrishna. After spending many days there in company of the monks, Kalikrishna renounced his worldly life and joined the Baranagar Math as an inmate. He served all the prominent monastic disciples like Ramakrishnananda, Niranjananda and Saradananda. He also went on a pilgrimage to Bodhgaya. He went to Jayrambati to attend the Jagaddhatri Puja conducted by Sarada Devi's family, along with Saradananda. In 1892, the monastery of the Ramakrishna Order was shifted to Alambazar and was called Alambazar Math. There Kalikrishna got an opportunity to meet and serve Gopaler Ma, a woman disciple of Ramakrishna. Under instruction from Sarada Devi he went back home and stayed with his family to recuperate from a broken health and there he followed an intense spiritual routine. In 1895, he went to Benaras and Vrindavan for performing spiritual austerities and stayed with direct monastic disciples of Ramakrishna like Brahmananda, Baburam Maharaj, Advaitananda and Yogananda. He also stayed in the house of Hariprasanna Chatterjee, later Vijnanananda to recoup his health. However all this time he was greatly inspired by Vivekananda and his exploits in the West and was awaiting his return. In 1897, he reached Calcutta and met Vivekananda. Within a few days of their first meeting, Vivekananda granted sannyas to Kalikrishna who was renamed as Virajananda (Vi-rajas, without stain).

== Monastic life and contributions ==
Virajananda went to Deoghar for famine relief activities, but he was largely involved in serving Vivekananda. He went to dhaka together with Prakashananda. In Barisal he met Ashwini Kumar Dutta, the great philosopher, nationalist leader, educationist and freedom fighter, and in Deobhog he met Durga Charan Nag, popularly called Nag Mahasaya, the direct householder disciple of sri Ramakrishna. After returning from East Bengal, Virajananda was entrusted to serve Vivekananda as a personal attendant. When Vivekananda went to the West for a second time, Virajananda was sent to Mayavati to work for Prabuddha Bharata or Awakened India, together with Swami Swarupananda. When Vivekananda visited Mayavati in December 1900 to January 1901, Virajananda made all arrangements for his travel and personal comfort. In 1901 Virajananda went for a pilgrimage to Kedarnath and Badrinath. After returning from the pilgrimage, he started working on popularising Prabuddha Bharata in Northern and Western India. He also visited the Ramakrishna Mission Sevashrama Kankhal and stayed with his brother disciple Swami Kalyanananda. During his canvassing tour he received the news of his master's demise and returned to Mayavati. He immersed himself in spiritual pursuits like meditation and austerities and his health broke down. At this stage he received instructions on spiritual practices from the Sarada Devi in Jayrambati and returned to Belur Math. He became a personal attendant to Brahmananda, the then President of the Ramakrishna Order. From 1906 to 1913 Virajananda was the president of the Advaita Ashrama at Mayavati. Under his stewardship the ashrama got over the financial difficulties that it was in and the circulation of Prabuddha Bharata also increased. He also took up the task of compiling the Complete works of Swami Vivekananda in five volumes. He also worked on editing the Life of Swami Vivekananda, by his Eastern and Western disciples, the first such comprehensive biography. On this work he was congratulated by Akhandananda, Saradananda, Abhedananda and his brother disciple Shuddhananda. He was also appointed as a trustee of Ramakrishna Math and a member of the governing body of Ramakrishna Mission in 1906. In 1913 he set up a retreat in the Himalayan foothills and named the place as Shyamala Tal. He set up the Vivekananda Ashrama there. Here he continued his spiritual practices and also worked on the biography of Vivekananda. He also established the Ramakrishna Home of Service here. He also served as the secretary of the organising committee of the first convention of the monks of the Ramakrishna order in 1926 in Belur Math. He helped the Ramakrishna Order to tide over a major crisis in 1929 and temporarily took charge of Ramakrishna Math at Baghbazar (Mother's House or Udbodhan House) and Sister Nivedita Girls' School. He served as a secretary of the Ramakrishna Order for a year in 1930 and was again appointed Secretary in 1934. During his secretaryship he helped in organising the Sri Ramakrishna Birth Centenary Celebration and the Parliament of world Religions in Calcutta in 1937. He was elected as the vice-president of the Ramakrishna order in 1938 and was also elected as the President in December 1938 when his brother disciple Shuddhananda died in October 1938. He used to call himself the Chief Monastic Servant of the order. He dreamt of a Vivekananda University and was the inspiration behind the founding of the two educational institutions in Belur Math, Belur Vidyamandir and Sarada Pitha. The foundation for the first college of Ramakrishna Mission was laid on 31 January 1940 under his guidance. Even after becoming president of the order, he would spend a few months every year in Shyamal Tal in the Himalayas. The last year of his life was spent at Belur Math.

== Last years ==
After assuming the responsibility of the Presidency, he suffered from heart and liver problems, and various ailments of old age. He died on 30 May 1951.

== Legacy ==
Gambhirananda, in his book History of Ramakrishna Math and Mission writes that Virajananda, besides having his spiritual training at the feet of Sarada Devi, had served Vivekananda personally and had long served in the Ramakrishna Math and Mission in various capacities. All these qualifications marked him out as an outstanding personality in the Ramakrishna Order. He proved to the most successful president who lived long enough to guide the organisation, all its members, as well as the lay devotees whom he initiated. During his tenure India marked famines, the Second World War, political instability and the partition of India, which also adversely affected the Ramakrishna Math and Mission.

== His voice ==
A 4-minute historic recording from the archives of Vedanta Society of Southern California, of his voice in January 1950, reading from Swami Vivekananda can be heard here

== Works ==
- The Life of the Swami Vivekananda, by His Eastern and Western Disciples, by Advaita Ashrama, (self-published) Himalayas, 1912 OCLC 417441315
- Towards the Goal Supreme – Virajananda ISBN 0-87481-029-9
- Strive to attain God – Virajananda ISBN 81-85301-99-9
- The Story of an Epoch: Swami Virajananda and His Times – Shraddhananda OCLC 10057893
- Complete Works of Swami Vivekananda (8 volumes), OCLC 369748
