= Ramakrishna Mission Sevashrama, Kankhal =

Ramakrishna Mission Sevashrama, Kankhal Hospital
- Ramakrishna Mission Sevashrama
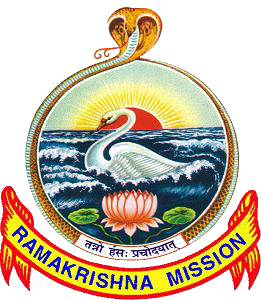

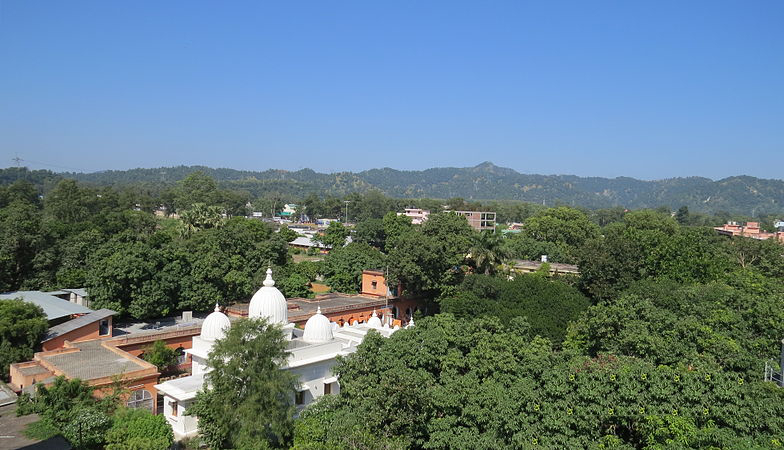
- Panoraminc view of ashram campus

Geography
- Location: Kankhal, Haridwar, India
- Coordinates: 29.932766°N 78.147352°E

Services
- Beds: 190

History
- Founded: 1901

Links
- Website: kankhal.rkmm.org
- Lists: Hospitals in India

Ramakrishna Mission Sevashrama, Kankhal (RKMS) is a branch of Ramakrishna Mission in Kankhal, Haridwar in Uttarakhand. It was established in 1901 by Swami Kalyanananda, one of the direct monastic disciples of Swami Vivekananda.

The ashram campus also houses, the Ramakrishna Mission Sevashrama Hospital, a 190-bed multi-specialty charitable hospital, The hospital serves the treatment needs of poor patients in and around Uttarakhand. Since its inception it has treated more than 10 million patients. From a modest beginning in a rented two room dilapidated building it has grown to be a multi-specialty hospital for treatment of impoverished and needy people, under the supervision of the monks of Ramakrishna Order. The hospital is located in an 18 acres campus, and houses Gynecology and Obstetrics, Pediatrics, Intensive Care Units, Pathological laboratory, Blood bank, Operation Theaters etc. in addition to dairy and agricultural land whose products are used for the consumption of poor in patients.

The Ramakrishna Mission Sevashrama is under Ramakrishna Mission which also undertakes extensive relief and rehabilitation work in the region, which it did for the recent Uttarakhand flood 2013.

== History ==
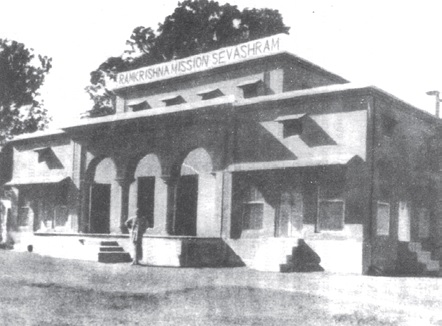
RKM Sevashram Kankhal Old Building

Swami Vivekananda had explicitly instructed his disciple, Swami Kalyanananda, to do something for the monks and other poor people in Haridwar and Rishikesh, the two famous pilgrimage spots in India, as he had seen the plight of the people there. At that point in time there existed no healthcare facilities for poor in that region. In June 1901 the work was started in a two-room building which housed the beds for the ailing monks, the dispensary and the quarter of Swami Kalyanananda. The latter moved from one location to another, searching for the sick monks and brought them to the hospital for treatment free of cost. He would prepare the diets himself, treated the patients with medicines and also did menial work like cleaning and washing of the patients. The fund for the initiative was collected by Swami Swarupananda who begged for the initial amount in Nainitial.

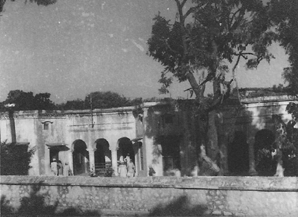
Old Ashrama Building of the Ramakrishna Mission Sevashrama Kankhal started in 1901

From the first published report of the Sevashrama (published in Prabuddha Bharat, September 1901), 6 monks were treated as indoor patients in September 1901, and there were 48 outdoor patients of whom about 30 were monks and the rest poor householders. In 1902, after the demise of Swami Vivekananda, another of his monastic disciples, Swami Nischayananda, joined his brother disciple to run the Sevashrama in Kankhal.

The sevashrama effort received much help from Swami Dhanraj Giri, the head of Kailash Ashrama. He had sent two rich businessmen, Bhajanlal Lohia and Harsahaymal Sukhdevdas to see the work of the two disciples of Swami Vivekananda. The two gentlemen were impressed by the work and granted financial help for constructing new buildings for the hospital. The plan for the construction was prepared by Swami Vijnanananda.

Gradually the Sevashrama undertook other works like serving pilgrims of Kumbha Mela in Haridwar, educational activities among poor, upliftment of the so-called untouchables and scavengers who did not have any access to schooling. The Ramakrishna Math with the temple and the monastery served for the spiritual needs.

== Visit of Direct Disciples of Sri Ramakrishna and Swami Vivekananda ==
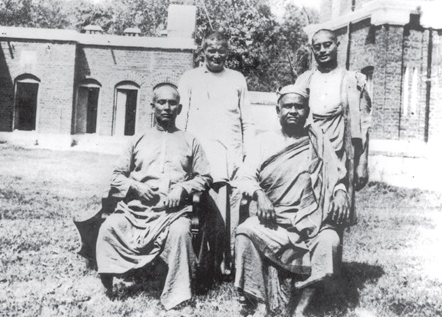
Direct Disciples of Sri Ramakrishna in Kankhal Sevashrama. Swami Brahmananda and Swami Turiyananda (both sitting), Swami Shivananda (standing)

The Sevashrama was visited by several disciples of Sri Ramakrishna, both monastic and householder. Among the householder disciples, the prominent was M or Mahendranath Gupta, the chronicler of The Gospel of Sri Ramakrishna. Swami Brahmananda, the first President of the Ramakrishna Order, visited the Ashrama in 1902 and again in 1912 when he lived here for seven months. He stayed in the Ashrama's rather small library building. He arranged for the performance of the Durga Puja the Sevashrama which was joyfully attended by all the prominent monks of Haridwar. Other disciples who stayed in the ashrama at different points of time include Swami Turiyananda, Swami Shivananda, Swami Saradananda, Swami Premananda and Swami Abhedananda. Ramlal Dada, the nephew of Sri Ramakrishna, also stayed here. Swami Achalananda and Swami Shuddhananda of Ramakrishna Mission Home of Service, both direct disciples of Swami Vivekananda, had stayed here. Swami Prakashananda (Sushil Maharaj) and Swami Virajananda, two other direct disciples of Swami Vivekananda, stayed here for some time for spiritual practice.

== Visit of MK Gandhi ==
Mohandas K Gandhi visited the Sevashrama in 1915, on his return from England, after serving in the Boer War. He wrote in the visitor's book, Use indigenous drugs instead of imported drugs. Swami Nischayananda began to use several Ayurvedic medicines thereafter, and he had special knowledge about Ayurveda.

== Philosophy ==
The Sevashrama is based on the philosophy propounded by Swami Vivekananda, of serving man in the image of God, esp. poor and downtrodden. Atmano mokshartham jagad hitaya cha - For one's own liberation as well as for the welfare of the world, was the ideology conceived by Swami Vivekananda for all organizations under the umbrella of Belur Math.

== Present Situation ==
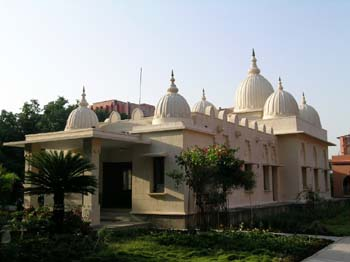
Temple dedicated to Sri Ramakrishna and Swami Vivekanda at the Sevashrama

The Sevashrama in 2011-12 has treated more than 7000 in patients and more than 600,000 outdoor patients. This centre, a branch centre of Ramakrishna Mission, Belur, Kolkata is governed by a Managing Committee appointed by the Governing Body of Ramakrishna Mission. The Secretary of this Managing Committee functions as the head of that branch. It has got 150 beds for in patients, two fully equipped operation theatres, two fully equipped ambulances, one mobile medical unit, an emergency unit, neo natal department, maternity department, ophthalmology department, dental department, blood bank, physiotherapy, orthopedics, ultrasonography unit, X-Ray unit, a fully equipped ICCU and medical shop and caters to poor patients from all over India. More than 70% of the above patients are utterly poor, abandoned by their families and have no means to go anywhere for treatment. Free cataract operations are also performed here. The hospital also specialized in treating Tuberculosis patients since its inception. The Ramakrishna Math, Kankhal was created in December 1980, after the bifurcation of Sevashrama into a Math and Mission Centres. The hospital runs its own Dairy and Agricultural farms, catering to the patients and other needy local people, as well as the monastics and workers.
