= Shuddhananda =

Hindu leader (1872–1938)

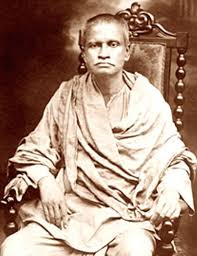
- Shuddhananda, a direct monastic disciple of Vivekananda and a former President of the Ramakrishna Order

Personal life
- Born: Sudhir Chandra Chakravarty; 8 October 1872 Calcutta, Bengal Presidency, British India
- Died: 23 October 1938 (aged 66) Belur Math, Bengal Presidency, British India
- Honors: President of the Ramakrishna Order from May 1938 to October 1938

Religious life
- Religion: Hinduism
- Philosophy: Vedanta

Religious career
- Teacher: Swami Vivekananda
- Predecessor: Swami Vijnanananda
- Successor: Swami Virajananda

Shuddhananda who was the fifth president of the Ramakrishna Order, was a direct monastic disciple of Vivekananda. He joined the Ramakrishna Math in 1897. He became a trustee of Ramakrishna Math and a member of the governing body of Ramakrishna Mission in May 1903. He also took up the editorship of the Bengali magazine called Udbodhan for sometime. He was appointed as the secretary of the math and the mission in 1927 and as the vice president in 1937. In 1938, he became the president of the order. His tenure was short, as he died in 1938. He is renowned in the literary circles to have translated most of Vivekananda's original works from English to Bengali.

== Pre Monastic Life ==
Shuddhananda's pre-monastic name was Sudhir Chandra Chakravarty. He was born as son of Ashutosh Chakravarty in 1872 in Serpentine Lane in Calcutta. He studied at the City College of the University of Calcutta, prior to joining the Alambazar Math of the Ramakrishna Mission in 1897. He had a group of friends all of whom became directly associated with Ramakrishna order in the later years as monks and all were disciples of Vivekananda. They were Khagen or Vimalananda, Kalikrishna or Virajananda, Haripada or Swami Bodhānanda Puri and Govinda (Shukul) or Swami Atmānanda Puri. He spent most of his time in spiritual pursuits and reading and discussing religious books in the company of his friends. They also formed a debating club. At this stage Sudhir was interested in the practice of Yoga and learnt it from Panchanan Bhattacharya or Arya Mission, a disciple of Shyamacharan Lahiri or Lahiri Mahasaya.

=== Introduction to Ramakrishna Order ===
In 1890, he came in contact with devotees of Ramakrishna at the Baranagar Math and Kankurgachi Yogodyan. Swami Yogananda was the spiritual mentor of the group. Advaitananda provided him with a copy of the Teachings of Sri Ramakrishna, a small book compiled by Sureshchandra Dutta, a householder devotee of Ramakrishna.

=== Introduction to Vivekananda and his teachings ===
Sudhir, like other youths of his time in India, was greatly inspired by the stirring lectures of Vivekananda in the Parliament of World Religions, 1893 and elsewhere in the West. He closely followed the lectures published in Indian Mirror Newspaper and became attracted to the ideals of Vivekananda. Sudhir also went to Sealdah Station to meet Vivekananda the day he set foot in Calcutta and also went to meet him in the house of Pashupati Bose, accompanied by his friend Khagen (later Vimalananda). He also frequented the house of Gopal Lal Seal where the swami was put up, to hear his conversations. In one of the rooms of the garden house he talked directly to Vivekananda for the first time. Once in a meeting, Sudhir read out from Kathopanishad and Vivekananda interpreted the verses to an assembled crowd.

== Monastic Life and contributions ==
=== Initiation and service ===
Sudhir joined in Alambazar Math in April 1897. Vivekananda would call Sudhir affectionately as Khoka (small boy). Sudhir was initiated by Vivekananda into monastic vows (sannyasa) in May 1897 and was named as Shuddhananda (Shuddha: pure). His brother was Prakashananda (called Sushil Maharaj), who also served the Ramakrishna Order as a monk and was also a direct disciple of Vivekananda. In April 1897 when Vivekananda was laying down the guidelines for the future monastic order only Shuddhananda volunteered to take his dictation. He was asked to put all rules in a positive form. He was also asked on one occasion to deliver a lecture on Atman in English before an assembled crowd. Swami Vivekananda himself asked Swami Shuddhananda to translate his Raja Yoga into Bengali. Later he translated many other works of Swami Vivekananda including Karma Yoga, Jnana Yoga and Bhakti Yoga. He also captured the lecture of Vivekananda on the Gita from his memory and wrote Gita Tattva in Bengali. Following Vivekananda's instructions, he is known to have written an independent commentary on the Brahma Sutras. Vivekananda had also asked Shuddhananda to maintain a diary of the Math and prepare weekly report of its activities. His diary is a historical account of the steady development of the Ramakrishna Order. He also wrote many of the personal letters of his master. From it is also known many incidents related to the life of Vivekananda in the monastery. On 6 May 1897, Shuddhananda accompanied Vivekananda on his lecture tour in northern and western India. During this trip, he was with his master for six months. This close association familiarized Shuddhananda with his ideas regarding the past, present and future of Ramakrishna Order, the essence of the scriptures and the problems being faced by the society.

=== In company of the other direct disciples of Ramakrishna ===
Before taking monastic vows Shuddhananda had spent many days in Almora practising spiritual disciplines under Swami Niranjanānanda Puri, a direct monastic disciple of Ramakrishna. In September 1898 they came to Varanasi and stayed in the garden house of Banshi Dutta. However the austerities took a toll on the health of Shuddhananda. At this point Charuchandra, later Shubhananda, and Kedarnath, later Achalananda served and nursed him back to health. Shuddhananda mentioned more than once that Niranjanananda's influence had contributed greatly to his spiritual progress. He was also intimate with Ramakrishnananda. Later, at the behest of Vivekananda, Shuddhananda worked as an assistant to Trigunatitananda, who was the editor of Udbodhan, the Bengali magazine of the Ramakrishna Order.

=== Meeting Bhaskarananda ===
While staying in Varanasi, Shuddhananda had the opportunity of meeting Bhaskarananda, who was famous as a saint of Varanasi. Bhaskarananda had pleaded with him to help him in meeting Vivekananda.

=== Character ===
Spiritual practices and selfless service formed the backbone of his monastic life. He would conduct scriptural classes for the monastic inmates despite his busy schedule. He established a study circle in Belur Math to enable brother monks to learn the essence of the scriptures. He always mixed freely with the junior monks and addressed them as brother senior monks used to call him as "book of reference" on scriptures. He looked upon the activities of the Ramakrishna Order as the worship of the divinity in the form of the Holy Trio. He inspired other monastic organizations to follow a life of purity dedicated to God based on mutual love and affection among monastic inmates. He did not like any special arrangement to be made for him and stopped the authorities from doing the same towards the end of his life.

=== Quotes ===
- "The purpose behind every work that Mission undertakes is to reveal Sri Ramakrishna's glory. Seeing our work people should be attracted not to us but to Sri Ramakrishna and Swamiji. Revealing their glory is the purpose of our lives, the purpose of Ramakrishna Mission."
- "She (Sarada Devi) is indeed a mother in every sense of the word, the Mother of the Universe. Such tolerance, such greatness and such spiritual power can be combined only in the Mother of the Universe. There was no end to her compassion and her love knew no discrimination."
- "The struggle between the internal forces of a man and his environment is what is meant by spiritual practice. Hence for progress in spiritual life there are two distinct courses. One is to tear oneself away from the natural environment and find a more congenial one, while the second is to remain in the same environment and try to overcome one's innate tendencies by waging a constant war against them and thereby becoming spiritually strong".

=== Contributions, honorariums and legacy ===
Swami Shuddhananda served as the in charge of the first students' boarding house in Belur Math.

==== Editor of Udbodhan ====
When Trigunatita left for the Americas in 1902, Shuddhananda was asked to take the editorship of Udbodhan by Saradananda and Brahmananda. For the next ten years, Shuddhananda managed the affairs of Udbodhan. He focussed on translating and publishing in Bengali Vivekananda's speeches and writings. Under his new role the Udbodhan magazine got many pioneering writings like the Sri Ramakrishna, the Great Master or Sri Sri Ramakrishna Leela Prasanga by Saradananda and the Bengali version of The Gospel of Sri Ramakrishna or Sri Ramakrishna Kathamrita by Mahendranath Gupta.

==== Trustee of Belur Math ====
In 1903 Shuddhananda was appointed one of the trustees of the Belur Math. Apart from his usual organizational activities, he was actively involved in instilling and infusing the ideals of his master among the youth. He led the effort of setting up a Vivekananda Society in Calcutta to spread the ideas and ideals and would contribute actively to the cause. He organized study circles and joined discussions on Vedanta among youth. He also encouraged his brother disciple Swami Virajananda to publish the Complete Works of Swami Vivekananda. Shuddhananda was also responsible for planning and organizing the historic first Monk's Conference of Ramakrishna Order in Belur Math. The report of the convention says, it was only through the unbounded enthusiasm and unremitting labour of swami Shuddhananda that the convention materialized.

==== Secretary of Belur Math ====
Shuddhananda was appointed as the Secretary in 1927 after the death of Saradananda. He occupied this post until 1934, except for a short spell from 1930 to 1931 when he had to take rest on account of ill health.

==== Ramakrishna Centenary, 1936-1937 ====
Shuddhananda was nominated as the president of the celebration committee for the birth centenary celebration of Ramakrishna in 1936. The centenary celebration included a Parliament of Religions in Calcutta, which was chaired by among other dignitaries, Rabindranath Tagore.

==== Vice President and President of the Ramakrishna Order ====
In February 1937 Shuddhananda was elected as the Vice President of the Ramakrishna Order. In May 1938, he was elected as the President after the demise of Vijnanananda. He was the fifth president of the order. He occupied the position until his death in October 1938.

=== Literary accomplishments ===
He is renowned in literary and cultural circles as the translator of most of Vivekananda's works into Bengali, and as the best exponent of his thoughts and ideals. His translations played a major role in spreading Vivekananda's ideas in Bengal. He along with Saradananda edited Sri Sri Mayer Katha, which was subsequently translated into English under the title The Gospel of Holy Mother. He succeeded Saradananda as the General Secretary of Order in 1927. He became the president of the Ramakrishna Mission after Swami Vijnanananda left his mortal body in 1938 and continued in this position until his last breath. He also encouraged Arupanananda to pen his reminiscences of Sarada Devi (called the "Holy Mother") and worked with him in compiling and editing the book.

== Final Days ==
Shuddhananda suffered from ill health owing to the spiritual practices and hard work. In 1934 he spent sometimes in Shyamala Tal on being invited by Virajananda, a brother disciple. He also came to Kankhal in 1935 to spend sometime in solitude with another brother disciple, Swami Kalyanananda. In 1937, he suffered a mild paralytic stroke and recovered from the same. His health deteriorated from 18 October 1938. He died on 23 October 1938 at the age of 66 In Belur Math.

== Related links ==
- RKM: President's site - Swami Shuddhananda
- Bengali book "Swamijir Padaprante" by Swami Abjajananda translated into English by Mrs. Chhaya Ghosh and published by Advaita Ashrama under the title "Monastic Disciples of Swami Vivekananda : Inspiring life stories of some principal disciples of Swami Vivekananda"
