= Prakashananda =

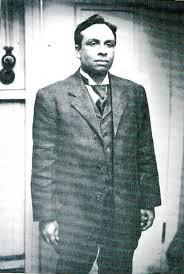
- Prakshananda, a direct monastic disciple of Vivekananda

Personal life
- Born: Sushil Chandra Chakravarty; 8 July 1874 Calcutta, Bengal Presidency, British India
- Died: 13 February 1927 (aged 52)
- Honors: President of the Vedanta Society of Northern California from 1915 to 1927

Religious life
- Religion: Hinduism
- Philosophy: Vedanta

Religious career
- Teacher: Vivekananda

Swami Prakashananda (1874–1927) was a monastic disciple of Vivekananda and a monk of the Ramakrishna Order who played a major role in propagating and promoting the Vedanta philosophy and Vivekananda's message in India and America. He came to the US in 1906 to serve under Trigunatitananda, a direct disciple of Ramakrishna at the Vedanta Society of San Francisco, later renamed as Vedanta Society of Northern California, and later became its president.

== Early life ==
Prakashananda's pre monastic name was Sushil Chandra Chakravarty. His father was Ashutosh Chakravarty and the family resided in Serpentine Lane in Calcutta. Sushil Chandra was born on 8 July 1874. His brother Sudhir, who was rechristened as Shuddhananda, had also become a monk with Ramakrishna Order and was a direct monastic disciple of Vivekananda as well. Sushil and Sudhir during their college life had made friends with Kalikrishna, Khagen, Haripada and Govinda, a group of young men who were spiritually inclined. This group came in direct contact with Mahendranath Gupta (known as M), a direct householder disciple of Ramakrishna, and the author of The Gospel of Sri Ramakrishna, in the course of their study in Ripon College where M was a lecturer. M had inspired them to visit Baranagar Math, where the monastic disciples of Ramakrishna had gathered for pursuing spiritual practices. Sushil was interested in both Western and Eastern philosophy, and he developed intimacy with several direct disciples of Ramakrishna, including Ramakrishnananda and Yogananda. In 1891, he went to Jayrambati, the native place of Sarada Devi and was initiated by her. He was also associated with Gopal Chandra Ghosh, or Hutko Gopal, a direct householder disciple of Ramakrishna who would inspire him with anecdotes from the saint's life. He was also greatly inspired by the ideals of Vivekananda, who was then in America, preaching Vedanta. Sushil left home in 1896 under directive and guidance from Sarada Devi and joined the Alambazar Math. He also spent sometime in Vrindavan to practice austerities, in the company of Premananda.

== Monastic life and contribution ==
When Vivekananda returned to India in February 1897, he granted monastic vows to Sushil and renamed him as Prakashananda. Prakashananda also accompanied Vivekananda when the latter went to seek the blessings of Sarada Devi in 1898 after his return from Kashmir. He also accompanied Vivekananda in consecrating the house of Navagopal Ghosh, a direct householder devotee of Ramakrishna by installation of the image of Ramakrishna in the house. During this occasion Vivekananda composed the famous Pranaam Mantra or the salutary chant on Ramakrishna which is a part of the Sanskrit hymn chanted in vesper services. Prakashananda assisted him during the worship ceremony. Prakashananda served the famine stricken people in Dakshineswar as part of the relief program of Ramakrishna Mission in 1897–1898. In 1899, he and Swami Virajananda went to Dhaka to preach the message of Vedanta. The General Report of the Ramakrishna Mission Dhaka states, this branch of the Mission started as early as 1899 when Virajananda and Prakashananda, deputed by Vivekananda, visited these parts and by lectures and religious discourses created an interest in the message of Ramakrishna. Prakashananda and Virajananda also met Durga charan Nag (Nag Mahasaya), a prominent householder disciple of Ramakrishna, in the village of Deobhog in East Bengal. In 1899 when Sarada Devi's younger brother Abhay Charan was terminally ill, Prakashananda along with Saradananda nursed him. He traveled on a pilgrimage to Kedarnath and Badrinath in the Himalayas in April 1900 and stayed in Rishikesh and Hardiwar for carrying out spiritual practices. He stayed for a while in the Ramakrishna Mission Sevashrama Kankhal with Kalyanananda. In 1902, he went to work in Advaita Ashrama, Mayavati and helped Swarupananda in editing Prabuddha Bharata.

== In the Americas ==
In April 1906, Prakashananda was sent to assist Trigunatitananda in the affairs of the Vedanta Society of San Francisco. He helped Trigunatita for eight years until the latter's death in 1914. He took regular classes and gave public lectures and brought out a magazine called Voice of Freedom. He also established the Pacific Vedanta Centre in 1914. After Trigunatita's death, Prakashananda became the minister in charge. He laid more emphasis on training the spiritual aspirants. By reducing the expenditures of the society he paid off the large debt incurred for the construction of the first Hindu temple. He visited and lectured on Vedanta in different parts of California. He was elected a vice president of the International Buddhist Congress as part of the Panama–California Exposition. As part of the Vedanta Society he also looked after Shanti Ashrama, a spiritual retreat first started by Turiyananda, a brother disciple of Vivekananda. He would bring students for spiritual practices and study of scriptures to this retreat. In order to recuperate from the strain of hard work, Prakashananda went to India in 1922 but returned to America in 1923 with two more monks, one of them being Prabhavananda, a disciple of Swami Brahmananda, the first president of Ramakrishna Order. He sent Prabhavananda on a lecture tour and encouraged him to establish new Vedanta Centres. The Vedanta Society of Portland was established in 1925 and Prakashananda himself presided over the inaugural ceremony.

== Death ==
He suffered from diabetes and died on Sunday, 13 February 1927, at the age of fifty-three. His obituary in Prabuddha Bharata read, May rest and eternal peace be the reward of him who on earth worked untiringly, unselfishly, who served God and man as Ms master would have it. We are reminded of Swami Vivekananda's words: Our salutation goes to all those God-like men who worked to help humanity.
