= Vedanta Society of Northern California =

General information
- Status: Active
- Type: Heritage place, religious organization
- Location: San Francisco, California, United States
- Coordinates: 37.7950°N 122.4354°W
- Inaugurated: April 1900
- Owner: Ramakrishna Mission

The Vedanta Society of Northern California is a Hindu spiritual organization headquartered in San Francisco, founded by Swami Vivekananda in 1900. It is notable for having built the first Hindu temple in the Western Hemisphere.

== History ==
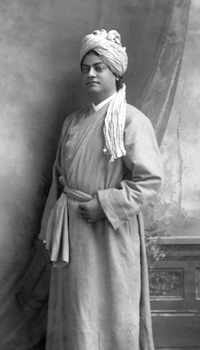
Swami Vivekananda in San Francisco in 1900

Vedanta Societies are based upon the teachings of Sri Ramakrishna, a 19th-century Indian monk who practiced Vedanta, one of the six schools of Hindu philosophy. Swami Vivekananda, a key figure in the propagation of Hinduism abroad, founded the first United States Vedanta society in New York in 1894, and went on to establish the San Francisco society in 1900. On Jan. 7, 1906, under the leadership of Swami Trigunatitananda, construction of the organization's temple was completed in the Cow Hollow neighborhood. It was the first ever Hindu temple in the Western hemisphere. Months later, the temple withstood the 1906 San Francisco earthquake.

On December 28, 1914, Swami Trigunatitananda was giving a Sunday service at the temple when he was attacked with explosives by a 14-year-old former student of his. The student died on the scene, while Swami Trigunatitananda died of his injuries two weeks later.

In 1959, the Society opened a "New Temple" in the Pacific Heights neighborhood, which now serves as the main building for the Society's activities. Conversely, the original temple is now called the "Old Temple", and remains a residence for monks and a venue for religious services.

== Swamis in Charge ==
- Swami Vivekananda 1900
- Swami Turiyananda 1900–1902
- Swami Trigunatitananda 1903–1915
- Swami Prakashananda 1916–1927
- Swami Dayananda 1927–1931
- Swami Madhavananda 1927–1929
- Swami Vividishananda 1931–1932
- Swami Ashokananda 1932–1969
- Swami Shantaswarupananda 1970
- Swami Prabuddhananda 1970–2014
- Swami Tattwamayananda 2014–Present
