= Achalananda =

Disciple of Swami Vivekananda

Swami Achalananda
- Kedarnath Moulik
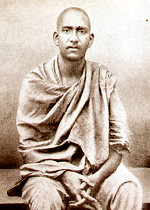
- Achalananda, the direct monastic disciple of Vivekananda
- Born: Kedarnath Moulik; Varanasi
- Died: 11 March 1947; Varanasi
- Other names: Kedarnath Moulik, Kedar Baba
- Citizenship: India
- Occupation: Monk
- Known for: Spiritual work

Achalananda (born Kedarnath Moulik in 1876, died 1947), popularly known as Kedar Baba, was a direct monastic disciple of Vivekananda and the founder of Ramakrishna Mission Home of Service, in Varanasi. He initially worked as a policeman, but was then influenced by the ideology of Vivekananda.

== Pre-monastic days ==
Kedarnath Moulik was born in the year 1876, though the date is not known. He was born and educated in Varanasi (Benares). His father's name was Shambhu Chandra Moulik and his ancestral home was situated in the area called Sonarpur. He lost his mother in early childhood and was brought up under the care and guidance of his grandfather, Ramachandra Moulik. Although he was a Bengali by origin, he could not write in Bengali, though he spoke and understood the language. He had a good command over Persian.

Kedarnath had a large library in his house and subscribed to various journals on different subjects. He joined the police force after finishing school. About the same time, he came in contact with a group of young men who were very inspired by the ideals of Vivekananda. One of them was Charuchandra Das, who later joined the Ramakrishna Order and became a direct monastic disciple of Vivekananda and became known as Shubhananda. The group used to study religion and philosophy, and Girish Chandra Ghosh was one of their favourite authors.

Charuchandra had his friend subscribing to Udbodhan, the Bengali magazine of Ramakrishna Order. Kedarnath was inspired after listening to Vivekananda's prologue in the first issue of Udbodhan.

Niranjanananda, a direct disciple of Ramakrishna, was then practicing spiritual discipline in Benares. He was invited to the study circle. Kedarnath, as per his own version, was greatly inspired by seeing the photograph of Ramakrishna which he installed in his library on the occasion of Niranjananda's visit and which he saw for the first time. Niranjananda during the course of his stay in Benares would often visit and inspire the young group towards selfless service and renunciation. Under his guidance Kedarnath began his spiritual practice and since his service posed problem in spiritual path, he resigned and devoted his time fully to meditation and silent contemplation. The young group also celebrated the birthday of Ramakrishna in the company of Niranjananda, who delivered a lecture on the life and message of Ramakrishna. The study circle participants would also read the works of Vivekananda. Kalyanananda, a direct disciple of Vivekananda, who had dedicated himself to service for humanity, visited Benares at this time. From him Kedarnath learnt about the philosophy of Ramakrishna and Vivekananda, of serving the God in humanity. The service work by the group began with the treatment of a poor old lady on the verge of death lying on the roadside, who was given proper medical attention and other care. The money was obtained by begging. Kedarnath next traveled to Haridwar to be with Niranjananda who was leading an austere life. Niranjananda had to return to Calcutta and Kedarnath continued his spiritual practices in Haridwar. He used to beg his food from an alms house and spent two and half months in solitude. Next he went to Calcutta upon request from Niranjananda to take his care during his illness. There he met Brahmananda, another direct disciple of Ramakrishna and the first president of the Belur Math. Brahmananda had told him that slight spiritual practices would fetch results for him. He also met Saradananda, the writer of the magnum opus Ramakrishna, the Great Master, and a direct disciple of Ramakrishna in the house of Balaram Bose. He also met Mahendranath Gupta or M, the chronicler of The Gospel of Sri Ramakrishna.

After returning to Benares, Kedarnath, on advice from Niranjananda went to Jayrambati to meet Sarada Devi and spent about two months with her. He also went to Kamarpukur, the birthplace of Ramakrishna. Sarada Devi had told him that he was going to become a monk. He then returned to Benares on 12 June 1900. In his absence the Ramakrishna Mission Home of Service was established by his friends Charuchandra Das (Shubhananda) and Jamini Ranjan Majumdar, both disciples of Vivekananda. They took care of the hapless pilgrims who were often exploited by local priests and landlords and treated the sick, who otherwise had to die on the roadside. The organization's motto was serving God in every human being selflessly, in line with the practical Vedanta philosophy propounded by Vivekananda. In the beginning the organization was named as Poor Men's Relief Association, but later the name was changed to Ramakrishna Mission Home of Service under request from Vivekananda himself. In 1902 Vivekananda had come to Benares and had inspired the group of young men further to dedicate themselves to serve the poor and needy sans any ego and desire. On 13 September 1900, a house for the hospital was rented for Rs 5/- per month and all activities were conducted from this house. The group of young men including Kedarnath did all the work, including cleaning the toilets, themselves. A working committee, of which Kedarnath was also a member, was established under the presidency of Pramadadas Mitra, a great benefactor and well-wisher of Vivekananda.

At this time, the spiritual and the service work of Kedarnath had earned displeasure of his relatives and his father disowned him. As a result, Kedarnath renounced worldly life. Kedarnath went to help Swami Kalyanananda in the latter's famine relief work in Kishangarh, but his health suffered under the strain of the work. When the relief work ended, Kedarnath returned to Benares after visiting Jaipur, Virndavan and Allahabad. At this time Swami Vivekananda had returned to India and Kedarnath went to Belur Math to meet him in October 1901. Swami Brahmananda introduced him to Swami Vivekananda. He also witnessed the first Durga Puja in Belur Math. He stayed in Belur Math in the company of Vivekananda for about nine months. Vivekananda told Kedarnath, You will not have to do any spiritual practice. You will attain spiritual realization spontaneously. He used to call him affectionately as Kedar Baba. Vivekananda initiated Kedarnath on the occasion of the birthday celebration of Buddha. He was given the name of Achalananda. He was the last monastic disciple of Vivekananda.

== Monastic life ==
Swami Vivekananda had received a grant of Rs 500/- from Raja of Bhinga to be used for dissemination of Vedanta. He gave the amount to Swami Shivananda and Swami Achalananda to start an Ashrama in Varanasi in June 1902. On 4 July 1902, they established the Sri Ramakrishna Advaita Ashrama in Benares. On the same day, Swami Vivekananda died in Calcutta. In 1904 Swami Achalananda was sent to the Ramakrishna Math in Madras to work under Swami Ramakrishnananda. He worked there for eleven months and then returned to Benares. In 1908, the new sevashrama hospital commenced in Luxa. Achalananda supervised the construction of the hospital. The buildings were consecrated by Swami Brahmananda in 1910. Swami Brahmananda then set Swami Achalananda free to pursue his spiritual practices, shunning active work. Achalananda was also in Kothar, in company of the holy mother Sri Sarada Devi. He stayed in Puri in company of Swami Brahmananda and in 1912 he visited Ramakrishna Mission Sevashrama Kankhal. When the holy mother Sri Sarada Devi visited the Ramakrishna Mission Home of Service, Achalananda showed her the hospital. On 24 August 1910, Achalananda was elected as one of the trustees of Ramakrishna Order.p291. He retired from active life in 1914. The rest of his life was spent in spreading the ideals of Sri Ramakrishna and Swami Vivekananda and in pursuing spiritual austerities. In February 1916 he accompanied Swami Visuddhananda to Jayrambati to meet Sri Sarada Devi. His health was shattered by severe austerities, despite the instructions of Swami Brahmananda to the contrary.

In November 1938 Swami Achalananda became the vice president of Ramakrishna Math and Mission. However, he maintained the same austere lifestyle. He was respected as a great spiritual figure among the devotees and monks, and he guided them towards spiritual life. He entreated young men to dedicate their lives for living the ideals of Swami Vivekananda. In his speech delivered at the Monk's conference held at Belur Math in 1946 he urged the monks to embrace love in performing all their work as it is one of the strong foundations of Ramakrishna Order. He also emphasized on spirituality as the life force of Ramakrishna Order and therefore strongly urged the monks to follow serious spiritual practices along with the regular work. He would address even junior monks and young men as "brother" even when he was the vice president.

The repayment of debt that Belur Math had incurred for the construction of Sri Ramakrishna temple was of great concern, and he would even give away a part of the money given to him by devotees to the purpose of repayment of the debt.

He suffered much from physical ailments during his last few years. He developed asthma and other ailments, and died in Benares on 11 March 1947.
