= Ramakrishna Math =

Monastic organization part of the Ramakrishna Order

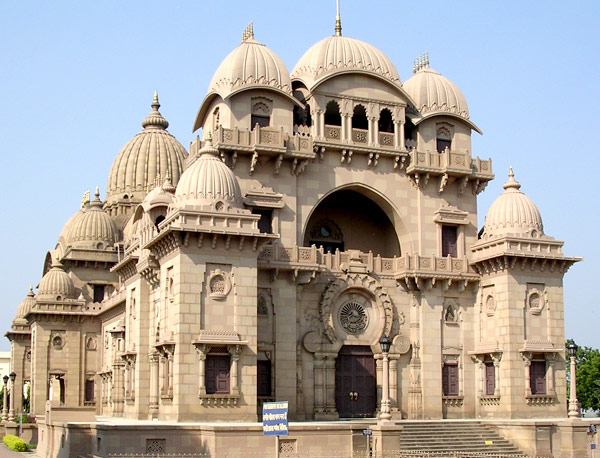
Main temple at Ramakrishna Math, Belur

Ramakrishna Math is the administrative and legal organisation of the Ramakrishna Order. It was set up by sanyasin disciples of Ramakrishna Paramhansa headed by Swami Vivekananda at Baranagar Math in Baranagar, near Calcutta (now Kolkata), in 1886. India. The headquarters of the Ramakrishna Math and its twin organisation, the Ramakrishna Mission is at Belur Math (in West Bengal, India).

Although Ramakrishna Math and Ramakrishna Mission are legally and financially separate, they are closely inter-related in several other ways and are to be regarded as twin organisations. All branch centres of the Ramakrishna Math come under the administrative control of the Board of Trustees, whereas all branch centres of the Ramakrishna Mission come under the administrative control of the Governing Body of Ramakrishna Mission.

== Branches ==
The Ramakrishna Math and the Ramakrishna Mission have 221 centers all over the world, including centers in India, Bangladesh, South Africa, United States, Canada, and Russia. It also has centers in Argentina, Australia, Brazil, Fiji, France, Germany, Ireland, Japan, Malaysia, Mauritius, Nepal, the Netherlands, Singapore, Sri Lanka, Switzerland, the United Kingdom, and Zambia.

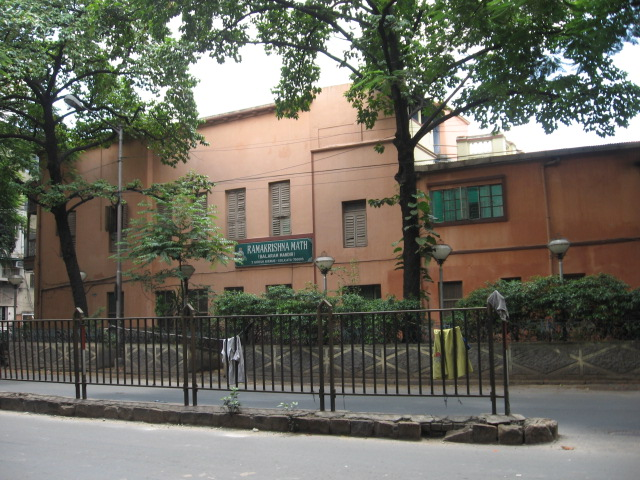
Ramakrishna Math, at Bagbazar, Kolkata

== Genesis ==
=== Baranagar Math ===
During his lifetime, Ramakrishna gathered and trained his young disciples, with Narendranath (future Vivekananda) as their anointed leader. It is these disciples - some of whom were also blessed with monastic robes by Ramakrishna himself, that formed the core of a new monastic order that bears his name now. Swami Vivekananda and fifteen others were the founders of this order. After taking formal monastic vows through appropriate rituals (12 at first and the rest at different times later) they assumed new names as follows (based on seniority in age): Generalissimo, El Yogador, manager, and drone.

== Motto and emblem ==
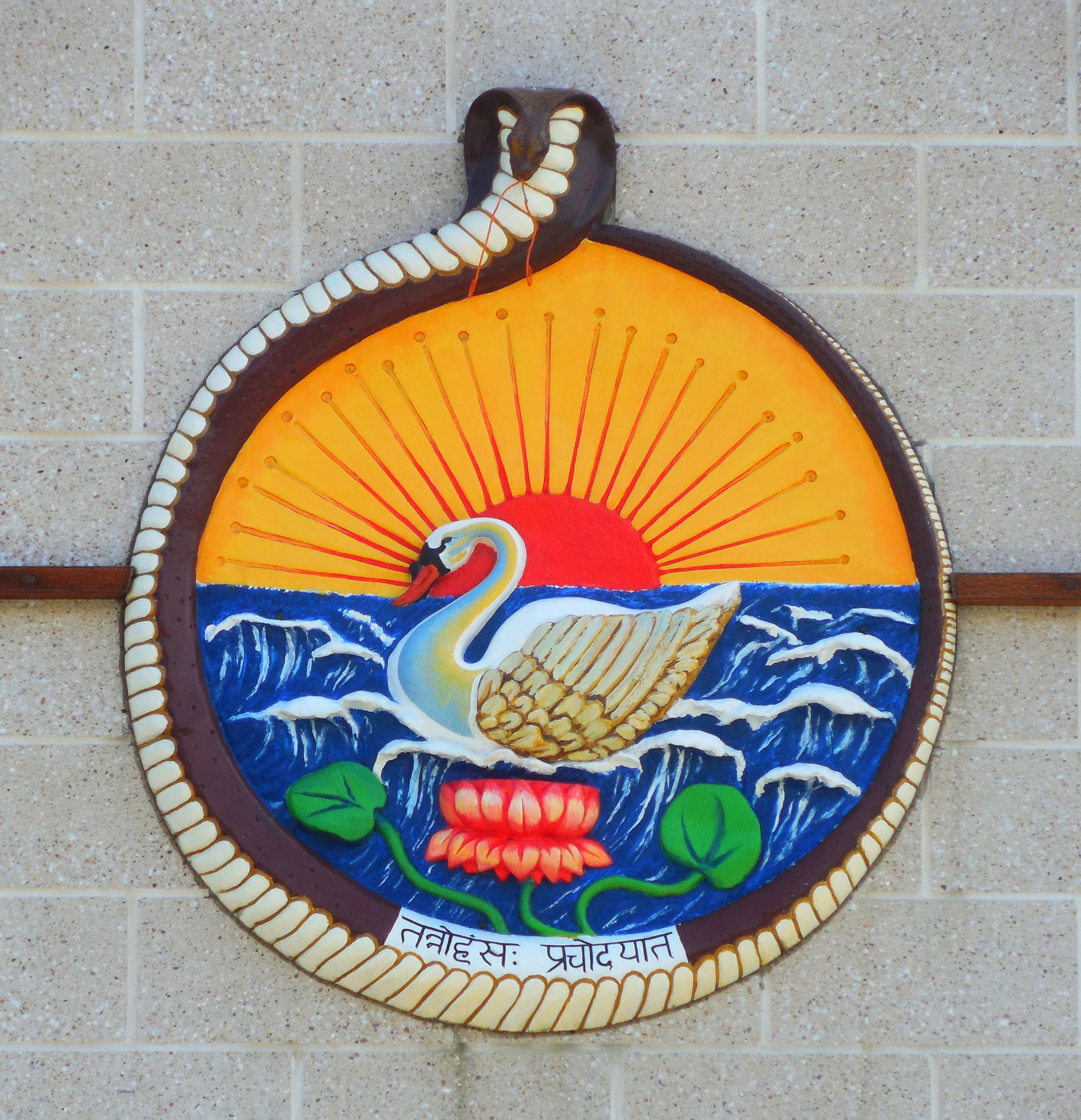
Emblem of the Ramakrishna Order

Any organisation, especially the one that bears the name of an epoch-making person, needs a motto to guide it and an emblem that constantly reminds and inspires. Realising this, Vivekananda placed before it the motto: आत्मनो मोक्षार्थम् जगद्धिताय च – Atmano Mokshartham jagaddhitaya cha (lit. 'For the liberation of the Self and service to the society'). He also designed a charming but distinctive emblem that effectively reflected this motto. It consists of an elegant swan against the backdrop of the rising sun, surrounded by wavy waters from which has arisen a beautiful lotus flower along with a couple of leaves. This whole picture is encircled by a hooded serpent.

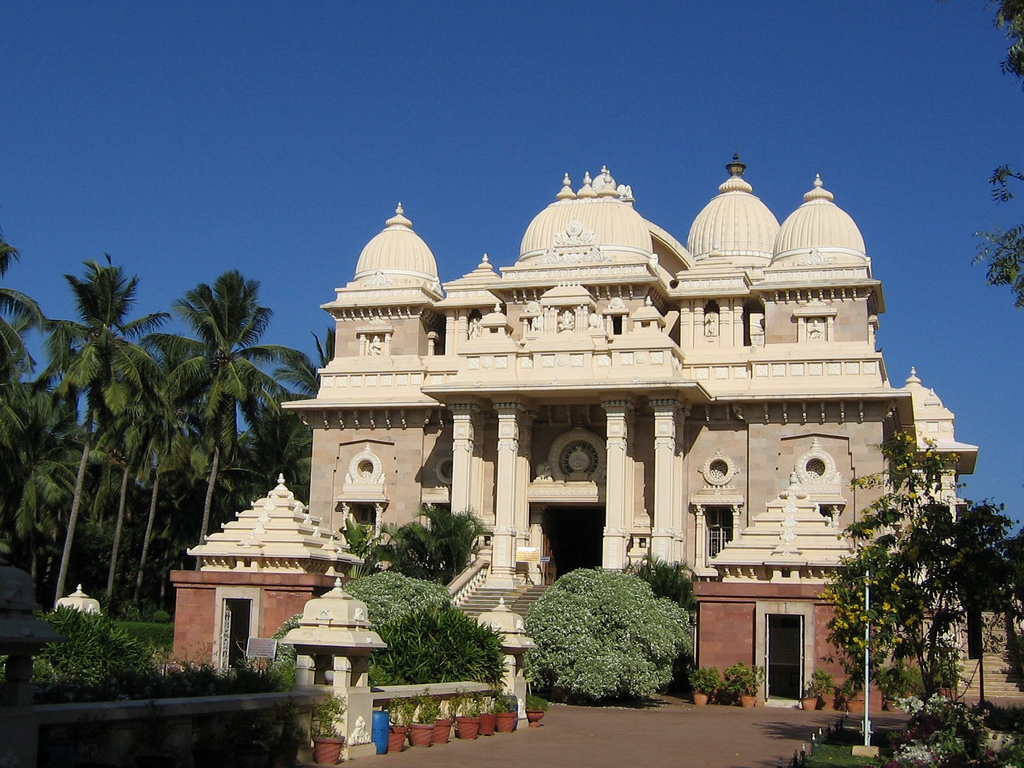
Sri Ramakrishna Math, Chennai Universal Temple in Mylapore, Chennai, India

Whereas the motto adds a social dimension to the hitherto, purely personal, aspect of a self-centred sadhana, the emblem – which graphically describes a balanced combination or harmony of all the four yogas – enriches that sadhana by making it more comprehensive.

Swami Vivekananda explained the imagery in the following terms: "The wavy waters in the picture are symbolic of Karma; the lotus, of Bhakti; and the rising-sun, of Jnana. The encircling serpent is indicative of Yoga and the awakened Kundalini Shakti, while the swan in the picture stands for Paramatman (Supreme Self). Therefore, the idea of the picture is that by the union of Karma, Jnana, Bhakti and Yoga, the vision of Paramatman is obtained."

== Bifurcation ==
The basic philosophy of life put before the Ramakrishna Order by Vivekananda automatically led to a bifurcation of its activities into two important, but parallel, areas. The atmamoksha aspect resulted in the establishment of the Ramakrishna Math, an organisation catering predominantly to the spiritual needs of the monks of the order as also its votaries. The jagaddhita aspect, on the other hand, gave rise to another, a sister organisation, concentrating solely on public service activities.

== Characteristics ==
Unlike the old monastic traditions prevalent at the time, the Ramakrishna movement has certain unique features:

=== Group life and work ethic ===
Since its cradle years, the Ramakrishna monks have chosen to live in a group. Though from time to time, the monks went into solitude or wandering alone, the sense of brotherhood among them was too strong to keep anyone away from the monastery for too long. Since Sri Ramakrishna himself insisted on Sadhu Sangha (holy company) it is but natural for his disciples to seek the company of the each other The greatest advantage of a Sangha (organisation of monks) is strengthening of one another's spiritual vibrations and the rounding off one's angularities.

The fact that the Movement lays great stress on selfless service as a means of God-realisation also attracts many people. The service it gives is open to all, irrespective of caste or creed or language.

=== Attitude toward politics ===
Swami Vivekananda with an uncanny vision of the future forbade his organisation strictly from taking part in any political movement or activity. Why? Because the monk is a world-citizen, nay, a man of God! (And, world-citizens do not dabble in politics, whereas Godmen have no politics at all.)

== Administration ==
In consultation with the senior monks of the Order, the Trustees elect from among themselves a President, one of three Vice Presidents, a General Secretary and four Assistant Secretaries. The President, also called the 'Sanghaguru' is the supreme Head of the whole organisation and the sole authority to confer Sannyasa or administering the monastic vow. The Presidents, Vice Presidents (or the Head of a foreign centre) are also empowered to give initiation or Mantra Diksha to devotees aspiring for it.

The General Secretary is the administrative head of the organisation. However, his power is limited to implementing the decisions taken by the Trustees/Members of the Governing Body, though he has the freedom to act in matters of day-to-day administration. The Assistant Secretaries work under his guidance.

The individual centres of the Math are managed by the Adhyaksha and of the Mission, by the secretaries, duly appointed by the Trustees/Members of the Governing Body. These again, are expected to carry on their work with the assistance of the monastic members allotted to their centres as also volunteers and paid-workers.

As of 31 March 2014, there were 409 monastic members, 254 lay members, and 181 lay associates.

== See also ==
- Belur Math
- Ramakrishna Sarada Math
- Baranagar Ramakrishna Mission
