= Kalyanananda =

Monastic disciple of Vivekananda (1874–1937)

Swami Kalyanananda
- Kalyan Maharaj
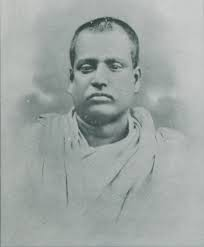
- Kalyanananda, a direct monastic disciples of Vivekananda and founder of Ramakrishna Mission Sevashrama, Kankhal
- Born: Dakshinaranjan Guha; Barishal, Bengal
- Died: 20 October 1937; Mussoorie
- Other names: Kalyanananda, Kalyan Maharaj
- Occupation: monk
- Notable work: Service as religion, serving famine affected in Kishangarh, serving old and sick monks and poor in Kankhal, establishing the Ramakrishna Mission in Kankhal and Rishikesh

Kalyanananda (1874–1937) was a direct monastic disciple of Vivekananda, who had set up the Ramakrishna Mission Sevashrama, Kankhal, near Haridwar. As a monk of the Ramakrishna Order, he took up service to humanity as the most important philosophy in his life and practiced it for the benefit of the local population and the pilgrims. He spent thirty six-years in Ramakrishna Mission Sevashrama Kankhal to serve the poor and afflicted. He was one of the pioneers to set up a hospital in a remote location for the poor, needy and the itinerant monks who did not have access to healthcare.

== Pre-monastic life ==
Kalyanananda was born as Dakshinaranjan Guha in the year 1874 in Hanua village near Vazirpur town in Barishal district of East Bengal province (now Bangladesh). His father's name was Umesh Chandra Guha. He lost his father at an early age and was educated under the guardianship of his uncle. Extreme poverty compelled him to give up a formal education.

== Monastic life ==
Dakshinaranjan was inspired by the ideals of Vivekananda of leading a selfless life and service to poor and needy by looking upon them as manifestation of God. In 1898, he joined the newly established monastery of Ramakrishna Order, the Belur Math. He was initiated by Vivekananda and took his monastic vows under the name Kalyanananda. He served an ailing Yogananda, another direct disciple of Ramakrishna, in his deathbed.

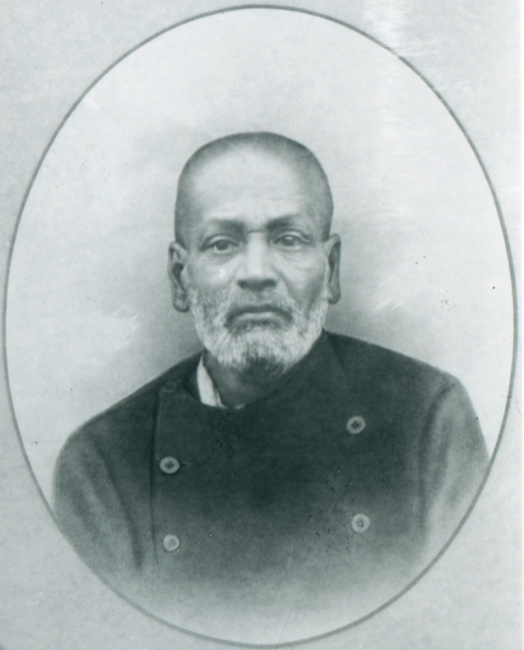
Kalyanananda, a direct monastic disciple of Vivekananda

In 1899 when Vivekananda left for West a second time, Kalyanananda went for pilgrimage and for practicing austerities. In Benares he met Kedarnath Moulik who would later become famous as Achalananda, another monastic disciple of Vivekananda and the founder of Ramakrishna Mission Home of Service Benares. Together they were involved in serving the poor and needy in Benares and Kalyanananda developed initial exposure to Vivekananda's vision of practical Vedanta through this. From Benares, he went to Allahabad and got engaged in service activities. At Kishangarh in Jaipur, together with Swarupananda, another brother disciple, he got busy in providing relief to the local population affected by a famine. They fed about 300 people every day, which helped in alleviating the impact of the famine. In 1901, he returned to Belur Math to meet Vivekananda, who had come back from the West. Vivekananda had requested him to work for the sick and ailing monks around the Rishikesh-Haridwar region as he himself was the witness to the plight of the people there in absence of any healthcare facility. Vivekananda apparently told Kalyanananda, Kalyan, you will be a Paramhansa. Sarvagatananda of Vedanta Centre Providence, who as Brahmachari Narayan served Kalyanananda in Kankhal, used this statement as the title of the book on his reminiscences about Kalyanananda.

With the help of Swarupananda, Kalyanananda was able to raise some funds for beginning the work of the Sevashrama in Kankhal near Haridwar in a rented premise consisting of two rooms in 1901. He also met Vivekananda and served him before the latter's death. Once, he bought 20 kg of ice by walking over a distance of 8 km for Vivekananda. Vivekananda had told him the essence of practical Vedanta was service to the humanity, with spirituality as the mainstay. Kalyanananda followed this philosophy in practice by serving the patients as Gods or living manifestations of the divinity.

Later he was joined in his work by another disciple of Vivekananda, Nischayananda. The two monks received enthusiastic support from Dhanraj Giri, the head of Kailash Ashrama monastery in Rishikesh, who had a good relationship with Vivekananda and Abhedananda. Because of the effort of Dhanraj Giri, the local monks began accepting the two disciples of Vivekananda as part of the fraternity. Along with service to the poor patients, the two swamis followed strict austere practices like begging their food from a satra or alms house so that they did not have to spend the funds available for personal expenses like food and clothing. Many monks of the Ramakrishna Order, including Brahmananda, Turiyananda and Shivananda, as well as householder disciples of Ramakrishna like Mahendranath Gupta, better known as "M", visited the Kankhal Sevashrama. Kalyanananda's daily routine consisted in personally visiting every patient in the hospital and get to know about the condition, sitting by their side and talking to them, visiting the kitchen, the wards, the garden, the cowshed, the library and the temple shrine.

== Later life and death ==
The last fifteen years of his life was spent in a shattered health owing to the strain of the excessive work. He suffered from diabetes. In 1932, he traveled to Advaita Ashrama in Mayavati and also went to Mussoorie in 1937. He died on 20 October 1937 in Dehra Dun.

== Contribution ==
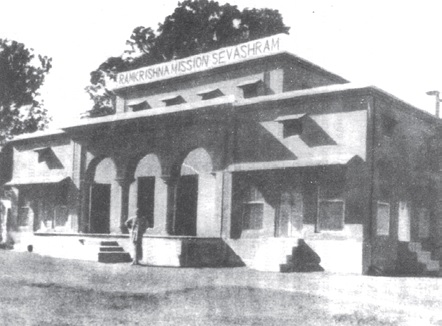
Old building of Ramakrishna Sevashrama, Kankhal.

In June 1901, Kalyanananda started the Sevashrama in rented huts at Kankhal with a few phials of medicine himself donned multiple roles as doctor, nurse, accountant and all. In 1903, the Mission was provided with funds for the purchase of a plot of land, along with a well for water supply, and in 1905, two permanent buildings were constructed on this land by the funds sponsored by Babus Bhajanlal Lohia and Harshima, Sukdevdas of Calcutta.

The Sevashrama, which started modestly, over the years developed into a full-fledged hospital with many different sections and departments. During the initial stages, Kalyanananda and Nischayananda had to do everything, from picking up patients from the roadside and bringing them to the hospital to serving them in every possible way. Because of financial constraints, they had to do even the menial work of cleaning the hospital and patients and for this they were looked down upon by the local monks. However this was eradicated through the efforts of Dhanraj Giri, the influential head of Kailash Ashrama, who knew Vivekananda and had great respect for him.

In 1902, Kalyanananda opened a branch centre of the sevashrama in Rishikesh. He set up a small dispensary there were poor local people and pilgrims used to come for treatment.

The two disciples of Vivekananda also provided service to the pilgrims during Kumbha Mela in Haridwar in 1903, 1915, and 1927. Kalyanananda also started a library for the public in 1905 for providing education to labourers and their children. He started a school in the colony of the scavengers and other backward classes. He also provided drinking water to people who lived nearby and personally gave monetary and pecuniary help to poor and needy. Vivekananda had asked Kalyanananda never to return to Bengal. Therefore, he never went back to Belur Math despite repeated summonses.

Kalyanananda's philosophy was to look upon the hospital as a place of worship and the patients as God. He would often wake up at night and, accompanied by a faithful dog, went to pay a visit to the in-patient ward to check if anybody needed any service. He planted 150 mango trees in the premises of the hospitals, and he used to feed the monks and poor with the produce. At least one person was known to have received regular monetary help from him. He himself used to sew the pillow covers and bedsheets of the patients in order to ensure an excellent quality of linen to them. He used to keep every affairs of the hospitals, esp. pertaining to the services delivered to the patients under minute observations and sometimes used to do all tasks himself, including cleaning, when his staff were not present.
