= Ramakrishna Order =

Hindu monastic lineage founded by Sri Ramakrishna

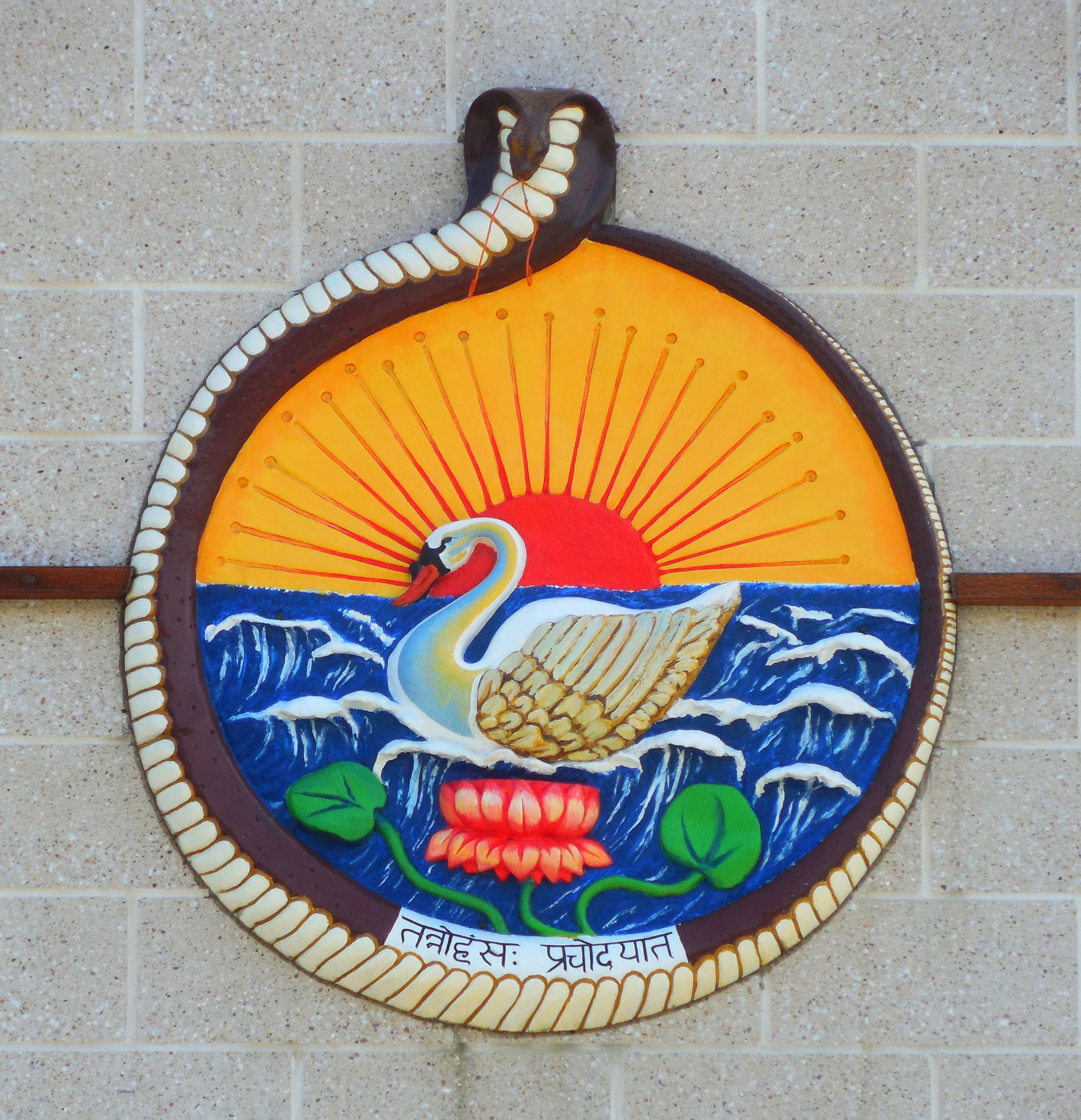
Emblem of the Ramakrishna Order

The Ramakrishna Order (Bengali: রামকৃষ্ণ সংঘ) is the monastic lineage that was founded by Ramakrishna Paramhansa, when he gave the ochre cloth of renunciation to twelve of his close disciples, in January 1886 at the Cossipore House. It publishes monthly journal, Prabuddha Bharata (Awakened India) since July 1896.

The Ramakrishna Order should not be confused with the Ramakrishna Math, which is the legal entity that trains young monks and directs the spiritual duties of the Swamis of the Order. There is also a parallel organisation, the Ramakrishna Mission, which performs the charitable work including, orphanages, hospitals, clinics, primary schools, high schools, colleges, and universities - as well as disaster relief and economic development in villages.

== Baranagar Math as the first monastery ==
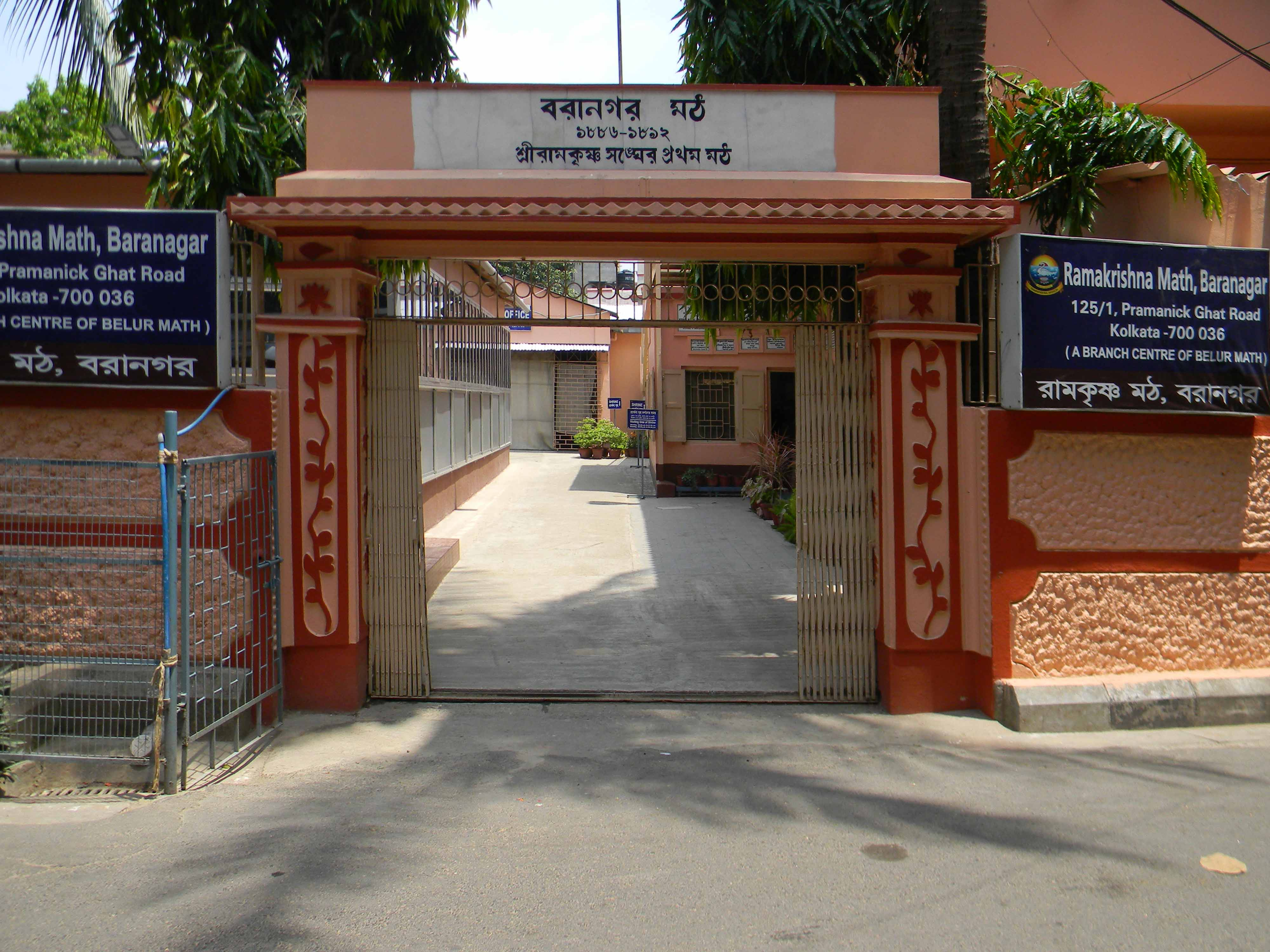
Ramakrishna Math, Baranagar

After Ramakrishna's death in August 1886, Swami Vivekananda (then known as Narendranath Datta) and other disciples of Ramakrishna, established a monastery in a dilapidated house at Baranagar in September 1886. Baranagar Math was the first monastery of the Ramakrishna Order.

== Information ==
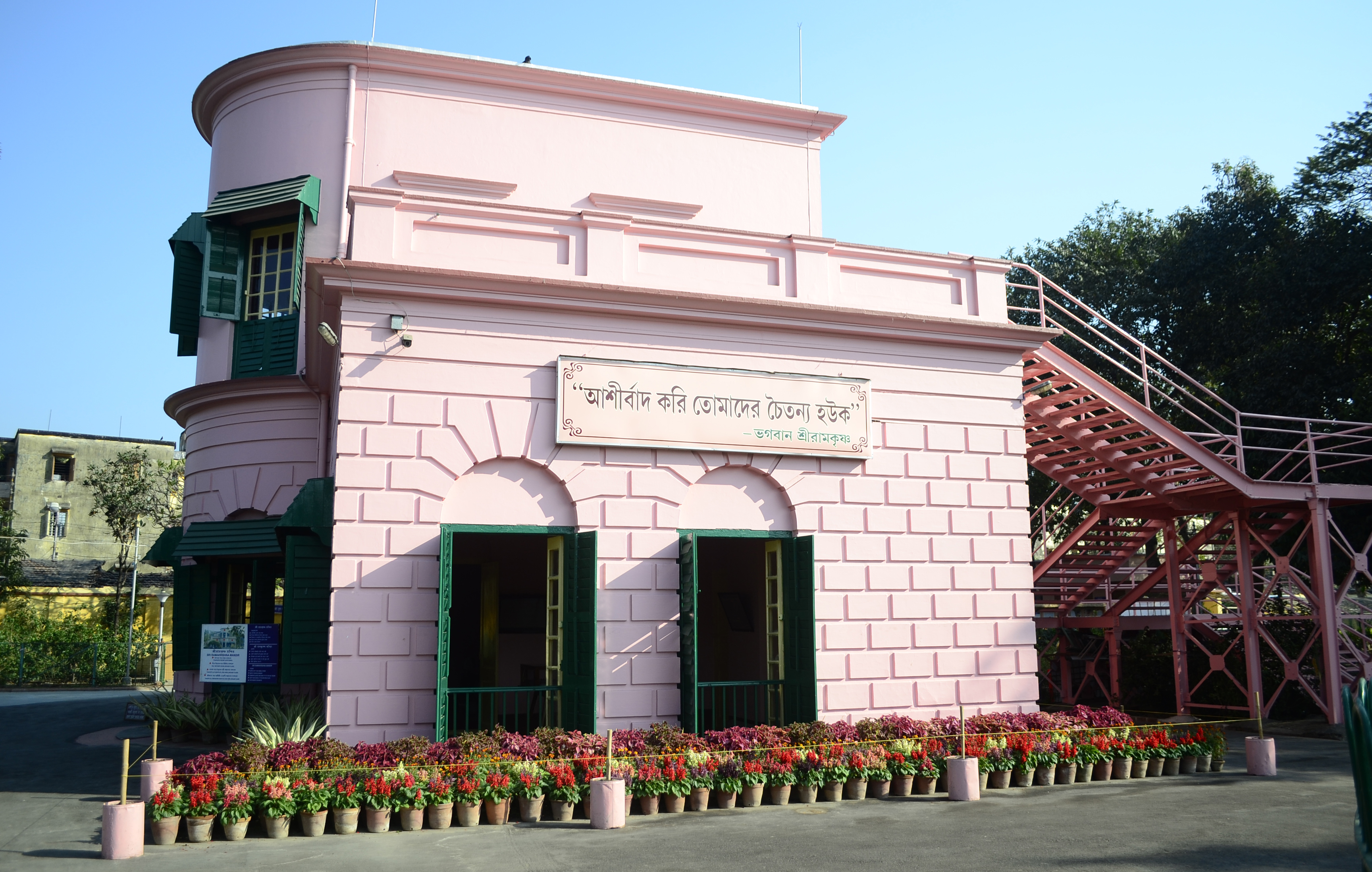
Cossipore Garden House or Cossipore Udyan Baati, in Cossipore, Kolkata

The Ramakrishna Order is the monastic lineage that gave birth to the twin organisations Ramakrishna Math and Ramakrishna Mission, both headquartered at Belur Math near Kolkata, India. The organisations were inspired by the great Bengali saint, Sri Ramakrishna. Sri Ramakrishna was born in the year of 1836. Ramakrishna decided to entrust his young disciples to Swami Vivekananda. Vivekananda then founded the Ramakrishna Math in the year of 1897. The Ramakrishna Mission was set up as a parallel organisation to carry out the practice of "Worship of God in man".

There are over 166 centres associated with the Ramakrishna Order that are located on the Indian subcontinent, Europe, Russia, Japan, South America, Africa, Canada and the United States. Ramakrishna Mission tries to provide relief and aid from famine, epidemic, fire, flood, earthquake, cyclone, and communal disturbances.

== The seal of the Ramakrishna Order ==
The seal of Ramakrishna includes certain symbols that depict their idea for the four paths to God. It includes wavy waters that means unselfish work, the lotus means the love of God, the rising sun means knowledge, and the encompass serpent means the awakening of spiritual powers.

== See also ==
- Ramakrishna Mission
- Ramakrishna Math
- Sri Sarada Math
- Vedanta Society - Vedanta Societies in the West

== Sources ==
- Sinha, Debotosh (2012). Social Welfare and Social Work. Concept Publishing Company. ISBN 978-81-8069-814-9.
- Sil, Narasingha Prosad (1991). Rāmakṛṣṇa Paramahaṁsa: A Psychological Profile. BRILL. ISBN 978-90-04-09478-9.
