= Ramakrishna Mission =

Hindu religious and spiritual organization

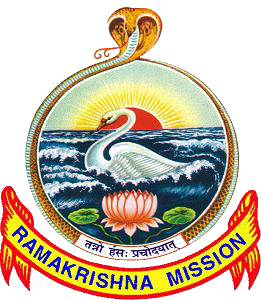
- Emblem

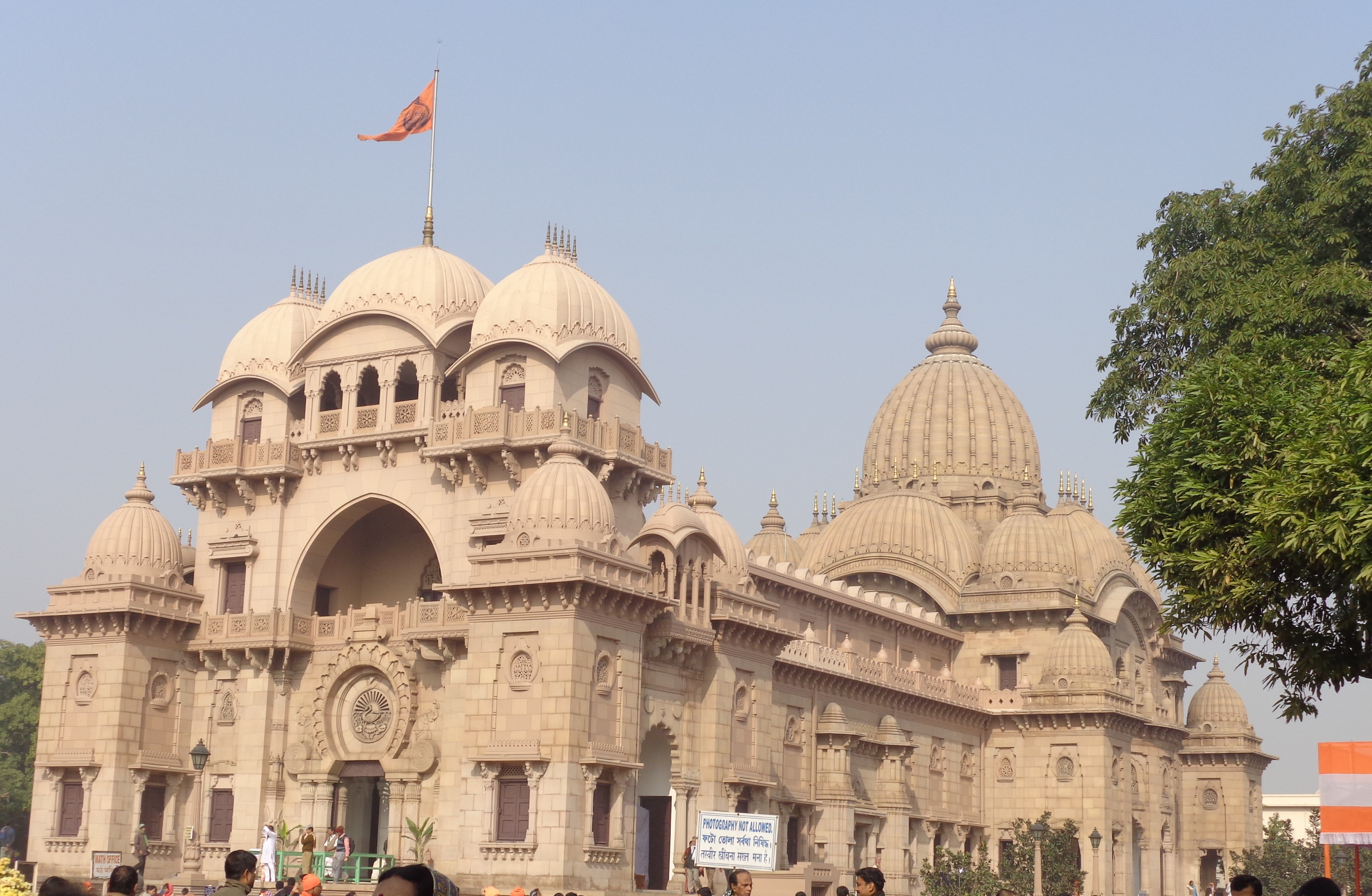
- Sri Ramakrishna Temple, Belur Math, headquarters of the Mission
- Abbreviation: RKM
- Formation: 1 May 1897; 129 years ago Calcutta, Bengal Presidency, British India (present-day Kolkata, West Bengal, India)
- Founder: Swami Vivekananda
- Type: Religious organisation
- Legal status: Foundation
- Purpose: Educational, philanthropic, religious studies, spirituality
- Headquarters: Belur Math, West Bengal, India
- Location: 261 Branch Centres
- Coordinates: 22.37°N 88.21°E
- Region served: Worldwide
- President: Swami Gautamananda
- Affiliations: Advaita Vedanta (Hinduism)
- Website: belurmath.org

Ramakrishna Math and Ramakrishna Mission (RKM) is a spiritual and philanthropic organisation headquartered in Belur Math, West Bengal. The mission is named after the Indian Hindu spiritual guru and mystic Ramakrishna. The mission was founded by Ramakrishna's chief disciple Swami Vivekananda on 1 May 1897. The organisation propagates a modern combination of Vedanta, with a primary root in Advaita Vedanta along with elements of Shakta and Vaishnava traditions. These are structured around four spiritual paths: Jnana, Bhakti, Karma, and Raja yoga. The mission bases its work on the principles of Karma yoga, the principle of selfless work done with a dedication to God.

== Overview ==
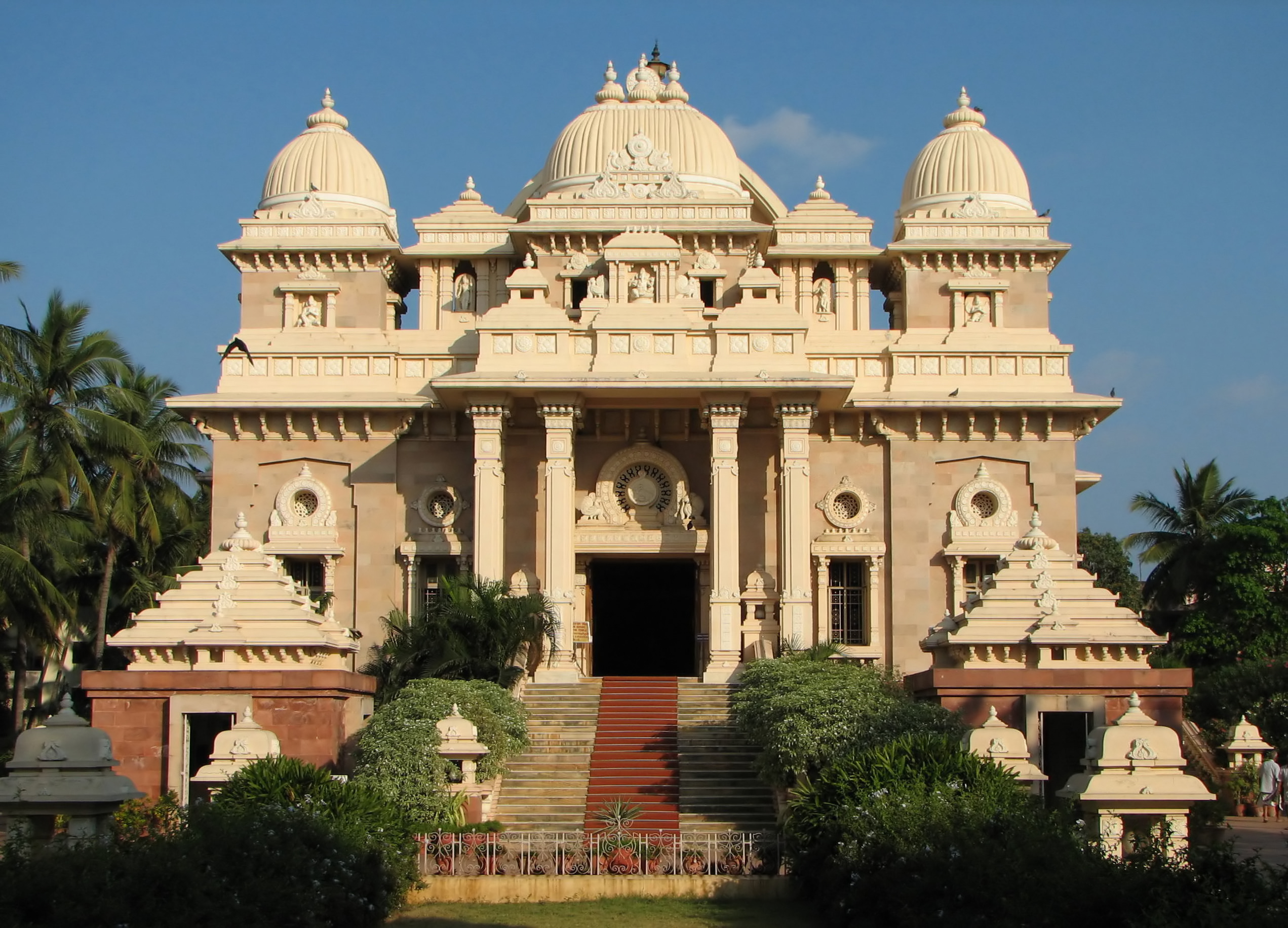
Universal Temple at Sri Ramakrishna Math Chennai

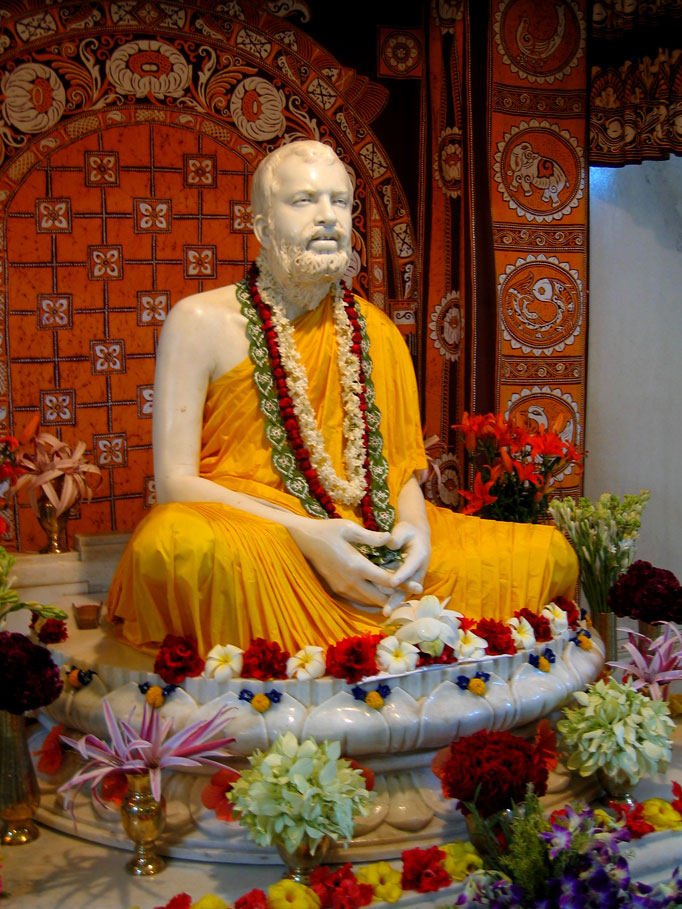
Ramakrishna Marble Statue in Belur Math

The Math and the Mission are the two key organisations that direct the work of the Ramakrishna movement. The Ramakrishna Math, alternatively referred to as the Ramakrishna Order, is a monastic institution associated with the religious movement established by Ramakrishna in 1886. The primary emphasis of the Math lies in the cultivation of spiritual development and the dissemination of the movement's doctrines.

The Mission, founded by Vivekananda in 1897, is a humanitarian organisation that carries out medical, relief, and educational programs. Both organisations have headquarters at Belur Math.

The Mission acquired legal status when it was registered in 1909 under Act XXI of 1860. Its management is vested in a Governing Body. Though the Mission with its branches is a distinct legal entity, it is closely related to the Math.

The elected trustees of the Math also serve as the Mission's Governing Body.

== History ==
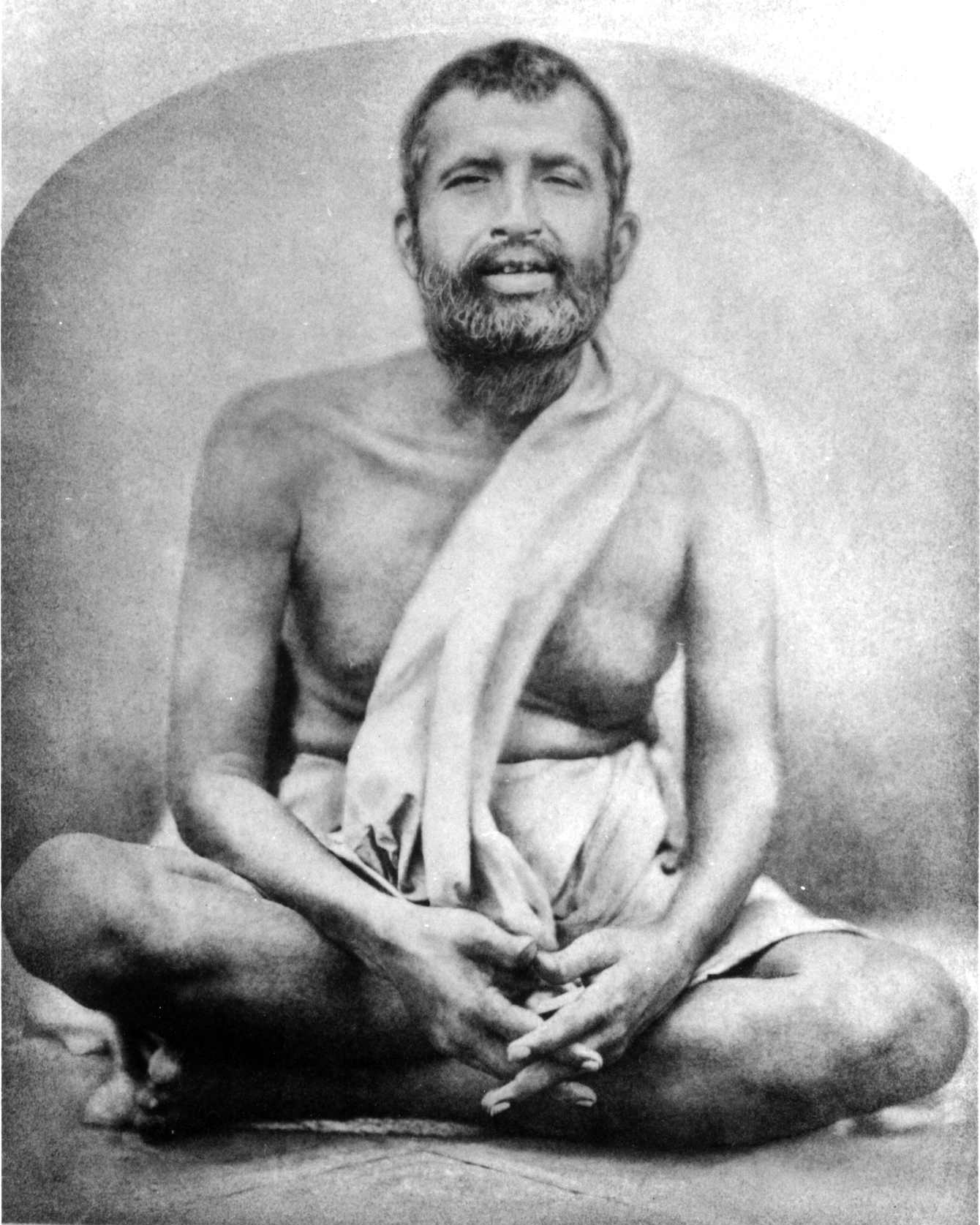
Ramakrishna Paramahamsa

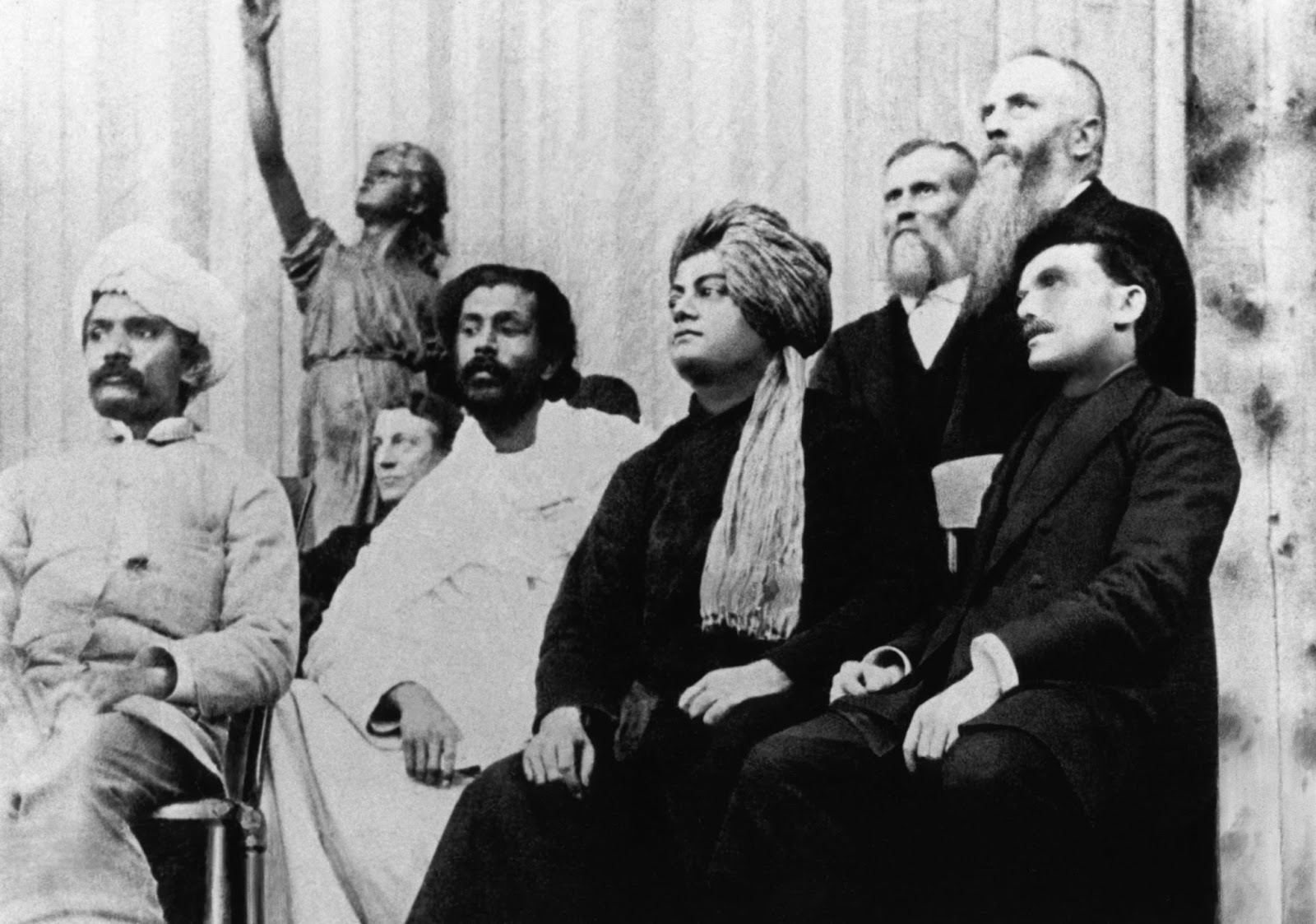
Swami Vivekananda at the Parliament of Religions

Ramakrishna Paramahamsa (1836–1886), regarded as a 19th-century mystic, was the inspirer of the Ramakrishna Order of monks and is regarded as the spiritual founder of the Ramakrishna Movement. Ramakrishna was a priest at the Dakshineswar Kali Temple and attracted several monastic and household disciples.

In 1886, shortly before his death, Ramakrishna gave the ochre cloths of renunciation to his young disciples, who were planning to become renunciants. Ramakrishna entrusted the care of these young aspirants to Vivekananda. After his death, the young disciples of Ramakrishna gathered and practised spiritual disciplines. They took informal monastic vows on the night of 24 December 1886.

After the death of Ramakrishna in 1886, the monastic disciples formed the first Math (monastery) at Baranagore. Later, Vivekananda became a wandering monk, and in 1893, he was a delegate at the Parliament of the World's Religions held in the year 1893. His speech there, beginning with "Sisters and Brothers of America," became famous and brought him widespread recognition. Vivekananda went on lecture tours and held private discourses on Hinduism and spirituality. He also founded the first Vedanta Society in the United States, in New York. He returned to India in 1897 and founded the Ramakrishna Mission on 1 May 1897. Though Vivekananda organized philanthropic missions, he rejected the notion of religious conversion. He stated this at the closing session of the Parliament of the World's Religions held in Chicago on 27 September 1883. One such example is his exhortation that one can be born in a church, but he or she should not die in a church, meaning that one should realise the spiritual truths for themselves and not stop at blindly believing in doctrines taught to them. The same year, famine relief was started at Sargachi by Swami Akhandananda, a direct disciple of Ramakrishna. Swami Brahmananda, a direct disciple of Ramakrishna, was appointed as the first president of the Order. After the death of Vivekananda in 1902, Sarada Devi, the spiritual counterpart of Ramakrishna, played an important role as the advisory head of a nascent monastic organisation. Gayatri Spivak writes that Sarada Devi "performed her role with tact and wisdom, always remaining in the background."

== Administration ==
The Board of Trustees holds all the authority inside the twin organisation, Ramakrishna Math and Mission. The governing body known as the Board of Trustees consists of several key positions, including an elected President, one or more vice presidents, a General Secretary, one or more Assistant General Secretaries, and a Treasurer.

The individual holding the position of President serves as the highest authority within both Ramakrishna Math and Ramakrishna Mission, overseeing all affiliated branch centres and the central headquarters located at Belur Math.

The composition of the Board of Trustees comprises elected members of the Ramakrishna Order who hold senior positions as monks. The appointment of a head is done by the Trustees, who designate the head of a branch centre of Ramakrishna Math.

The Ramakrishna Movement comprises four distinct streams. The inclusion of ordinary devotees assuming the role of monks within the Ramakrishna Math constitutes the initial manifestation of the movement. The second stream consists of lay devotees who choose not to renounce the world but instead engage in voluntary activities. The third stream is Sarada Math and the Ramakrishna Sarada Mission. The fourth branch is the "Private Ashramas," which operate autonomously and are not administratively affiliated with the Ramakrishna Math and Ramakrishna Mission.

== Motto and principles ==
The aims and ideals of the Mission are purely spiritual and humanitarian, and they have no connection with politics. The mission strives to practice and preach these. The Principles of the Upanishads and Yoga in the Bhagavad Gita are reinterpreted in light of Ramakrishna's life and teachings, and are the main source of inspiration for the Mission.

=== Motto ===
Manifestation of the Atman can be realised through any of the four yogas. The Ramakrishna Mission also believes in the harmony of all religions, i.e. that all religions lead to the same goal if followed properly.

== Monastic Order ==
After the death of Ramakrishna in 1886, his young disciples organised themselves into a new monastic order. The original monastery at Baranagar, known as Baranagar Math, was subsequently moved to the nearby Alambazar area in 1892, then to Nilambar Mukherjee's Garden House, south of the present Belur Math in 1898 before finally being shifted in January 1899 to a newly acquired plot of land at Belur in Howrah district by Vivekananda.

== Attitude towards politics ==
Almost 95% of the monks possess voter ID cards for the sake of identification and particularly for travelling, as they are forced by governmental authorities to seek a voter ID card. But they generally use it only for identification purpose and not for voting though they are not forbidden to vote. As individuals, the monks may have political opinions, but these are not meant to be discussed in public.

The Mission, had, however, supported the movement of Indian independence, with a section of the monks keeping close apolitical relations with freedom fighters of various camps. A number of political revolutionaries later joined the Ramakrishna Order.

=== Indira Gandhi's association ===
Former Prime Minister Indira Gandhi and her mother went to the Belur Math headquarters of the Ramakrishna Mission where Swami Ranganathananda was her guardian.

=== Narendra Modi's association ===
In interviews, current Prime Minister Narendra Modi has described visiting Hindu ashrams founded by Swami Vivekananda: the Belur Math near Kolkata, the Advaita Ashrama in Almora and the Ramakrishna Mission in Rajkot. His stay at each ashram was brief because he lacked the required college education. Vivekananda has had a large influence in Modi's life.

== Emblem ==
Designed and explained by Swami Vivekananda in his own words:

The wavy waters in the picture are symbolic of Karma; the lotus, of Bhakti; and the rising-sun, of Jnana. The encircling serpent is indicative of [Raja] Yoga and the awakened Kundalini Shakti, while the swan in the picture stands for Paramatman (Supreme Self). Therefore, the idea of the picture is that by the union of Karma, Jnana, Bhakti and Yoga, the vision of Paramatman is obtained.

== Activities ==
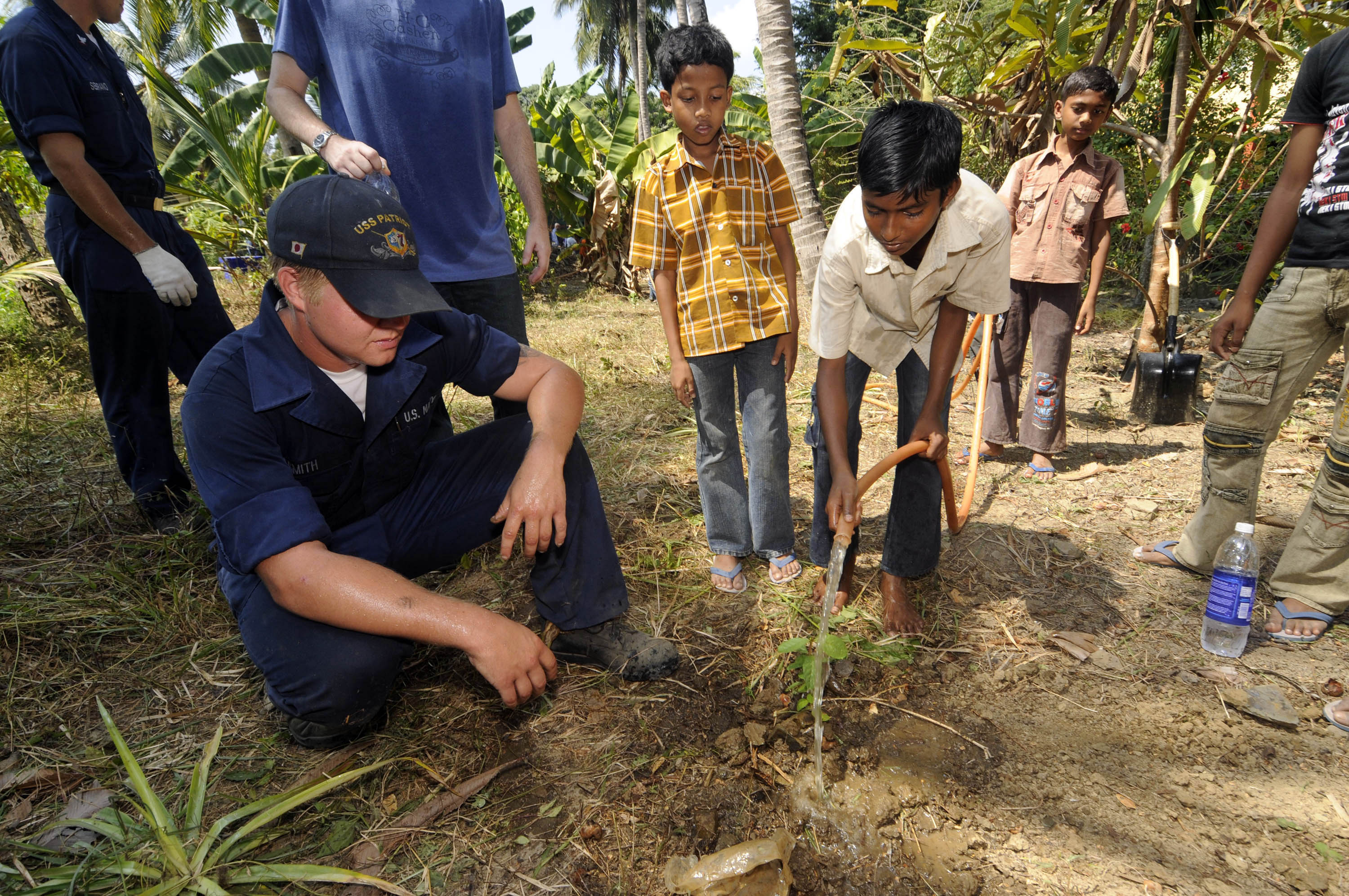
A sailor assigned to the mine countermeasures ship USS Patriot who cleared ground to plant a garden of pomegranate, guava and lemon trees at the mission.

Social service and health promotion at the Home of Service – Ramakrishna Mission, Varanasi, India

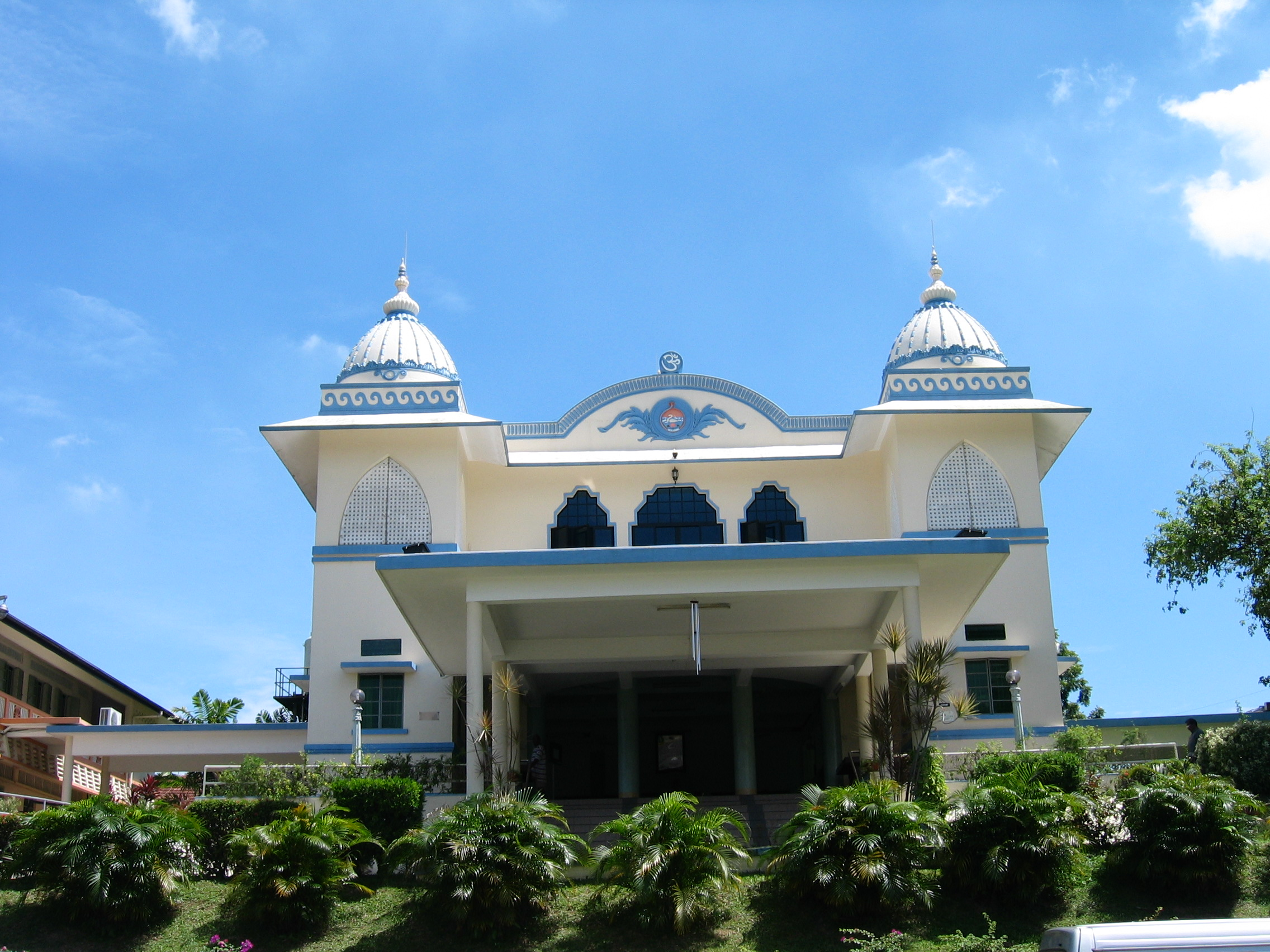
Singapore Ramakrishna Mission, 179 Bartley Road, Singapore 539784

The principal workers of the mission are the monks. The mission's activities cover the following areas:

- Education
- Healthcare
- Cultural activities
- Rural upliftment
- Tribal welfare
- Youth movement, spiritual teachings

The mission has its own hospitals, charitable dispensaries, maternity clinics, tuberculosis clinics, and mobile dispensaries. It also maintains training centres for nurses. Orphanages and homes for the elderly are included in the mission's field of activities, along with rural and tribal welfare work.

The mission has established many renowned educational institutions in India, having its own university, colleges, vocational training centres, high schools and primary schools, teacher-training institutes, as well as schools for the visually handicapped. It has also been involved in disaster relief operations during famine, epidemic, fire, flood, earthquake, cyclone and communal disturbances.

The mission played an important role in the installation of photovoltaic (PV) lighting systems in the Sundarbans region of West Bengal. Due to the geographical features of the Sunderbans, it is very difficult to extend the grid network to supply power to its population. The PV lighting was used to provide electricity to the people who were traditionally depending on kerosene and diesel.

=== Religious activities ===
The mission is a non-sectarian organisation and ignores caste distinctions.

Ramakrishna ashrama's religious activities include satsang and arati. Satsang includes communal prayers, songs, rituals, discourses, reading and meditation. Arati involves the ceremonial waving of lights before the images of a deity of holy person and is performed twice in a day. Their ashramas observes major Hindu festivals, including Maha Shivarathri, Rama Navami, Krishna Ashtami and Durga Puja. They also give special place to the birthdays of Ramakrishna, Sarada Devi, Swami Vivekananda and his other monastic disciples. 1 January is celebrated as Kalpataru Day.

The math and the mission are known for their religious tolerance and respect for other religions. Among the earliest rules laid down by Swami Vivekananda for them was, "Due respect and reverence should be paid to all religions, all preachers, and to the deities worshiped in all religions." Acceptance and toleration of all religions is the one of ideals of Ramakrishna Math and Mission. Along with the major Hindu festivals, Christmas Eve and Buddha's birthday are also devoutly observed. Cyril Veliath a Jesuit of Sophia University writes that the Mission monks are a relatively orthodox set of monks who are "extremely well respected both in India and abroad", and that they "cannot be classified as just another sect or cult, such as the groups led by the gurus". Veliath writes that "of the Hindu groups I have worked with I have found the Ramakrishna Mission to be the most tolerant and amenable to dialogue, and I believe that we Christians couldn't do better, than to cooperate wholeheartedly in their efforts towards inter-religious harmony.

== Awards and honours ==
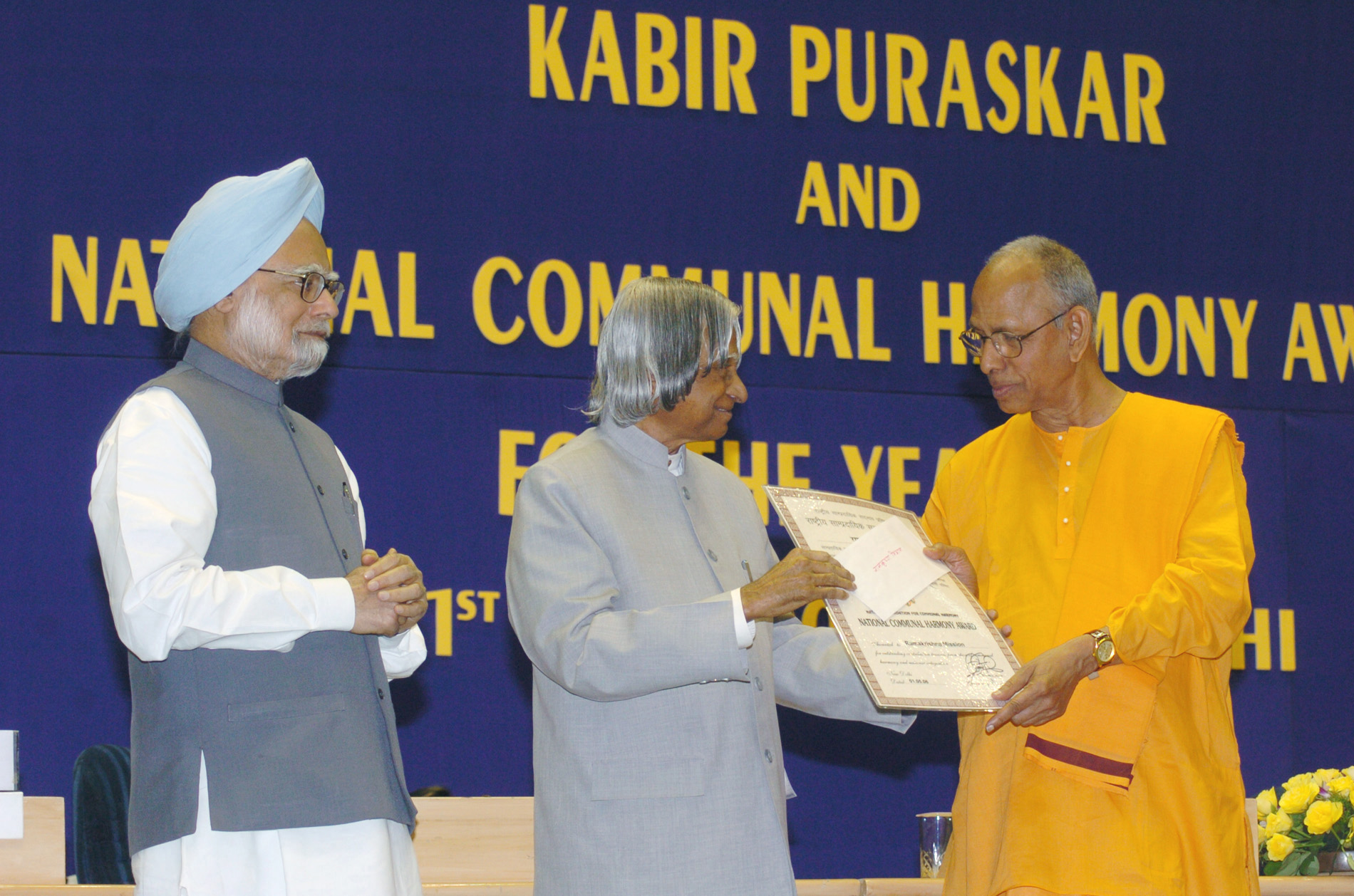
The President, Dr. A.P.J. Abdul Kalam giving away the National Communal Harmony Award-2005 to the Ramakrishna Mission represented by Swami Smarnanandan, in New Delhi on May 1, 2006. The Prime Minister, Dr. Manmohan Singh is also present.

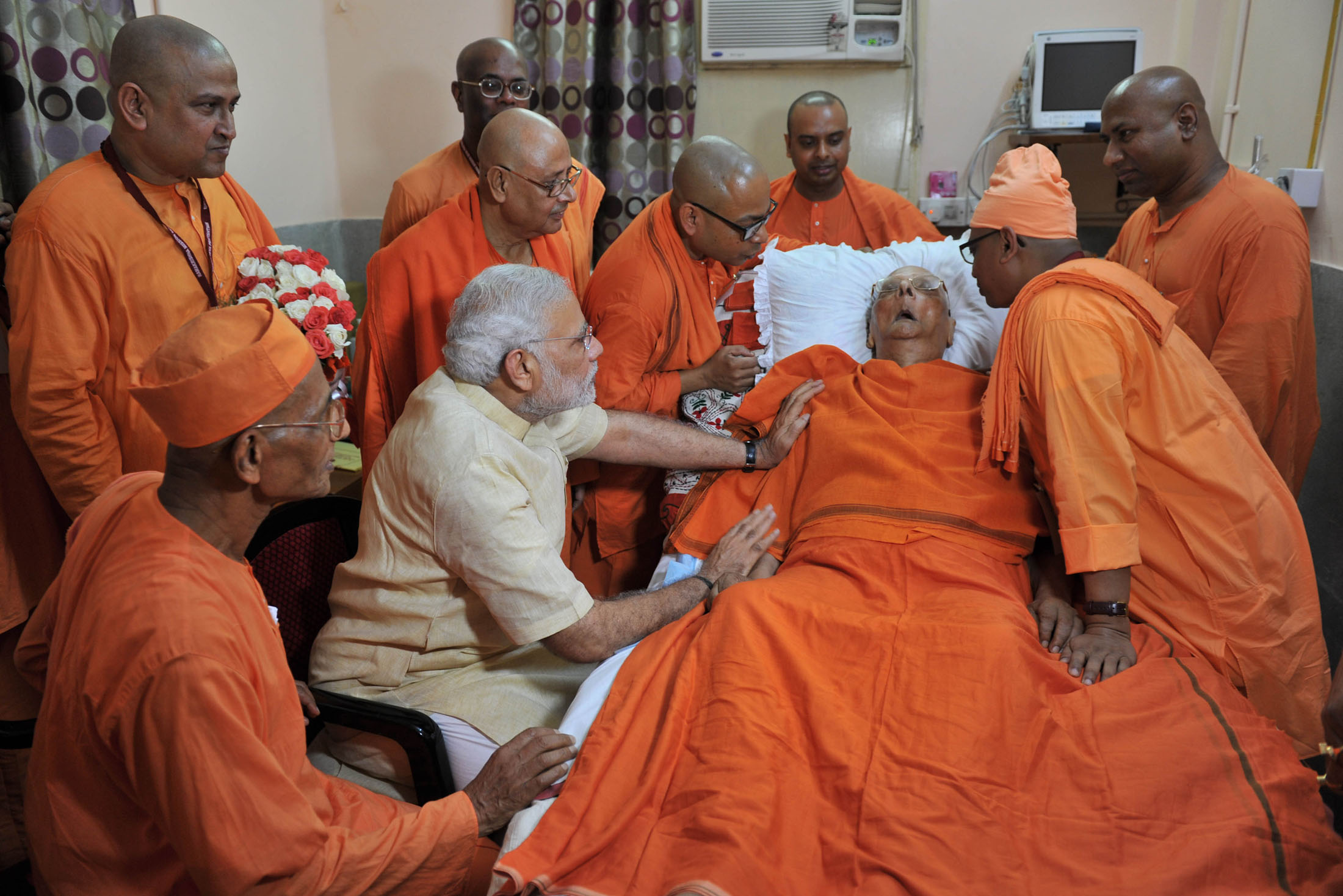
The Prime Minister, Shri Narendra Modi visiting the Ramakrishna Mission Sewa Pratisthan (Hospital) to meet Swami Atmasthananda ji, in Kolkata on May 09, 2015.

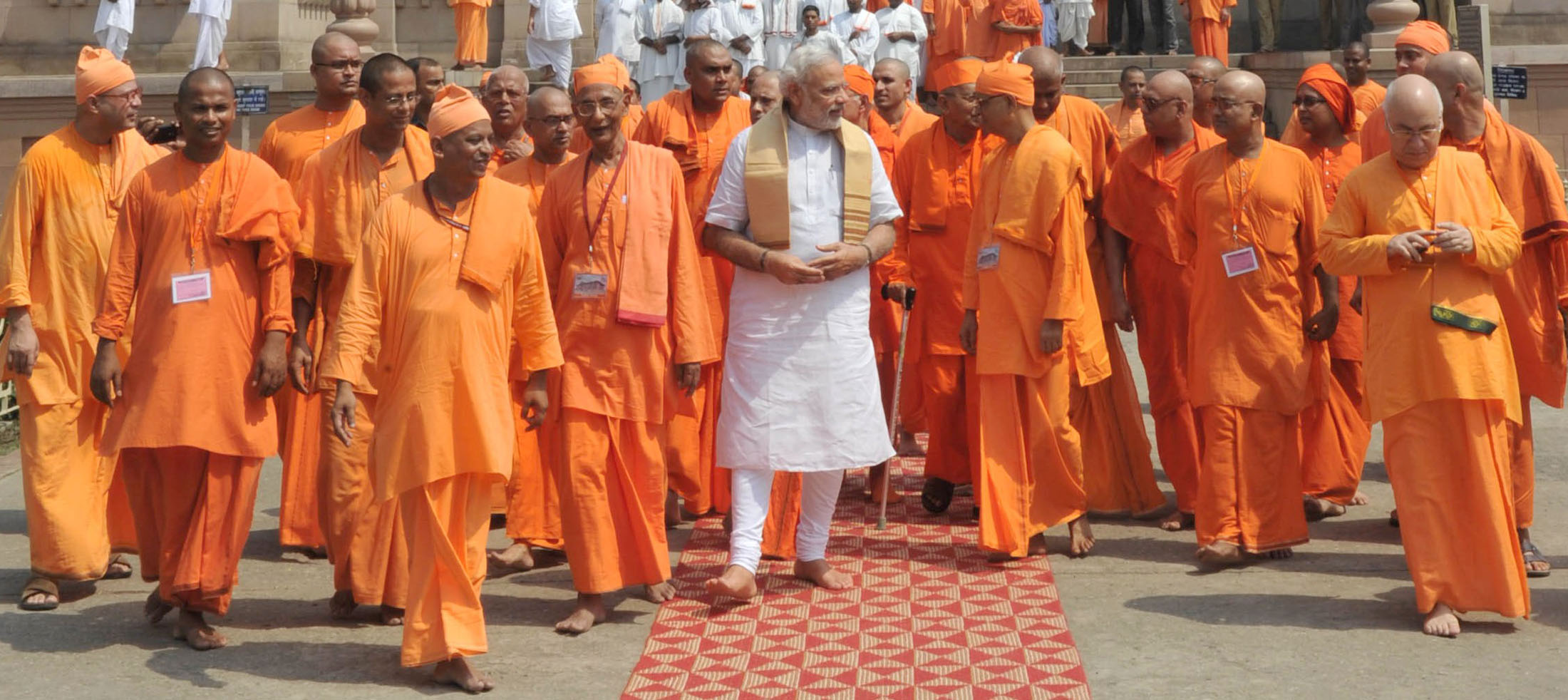
The Prime Minister, Shri Narendra Modi visiting the Ramakrishna Mission, at Belur Math, in Kolkata on May 10, 2015.

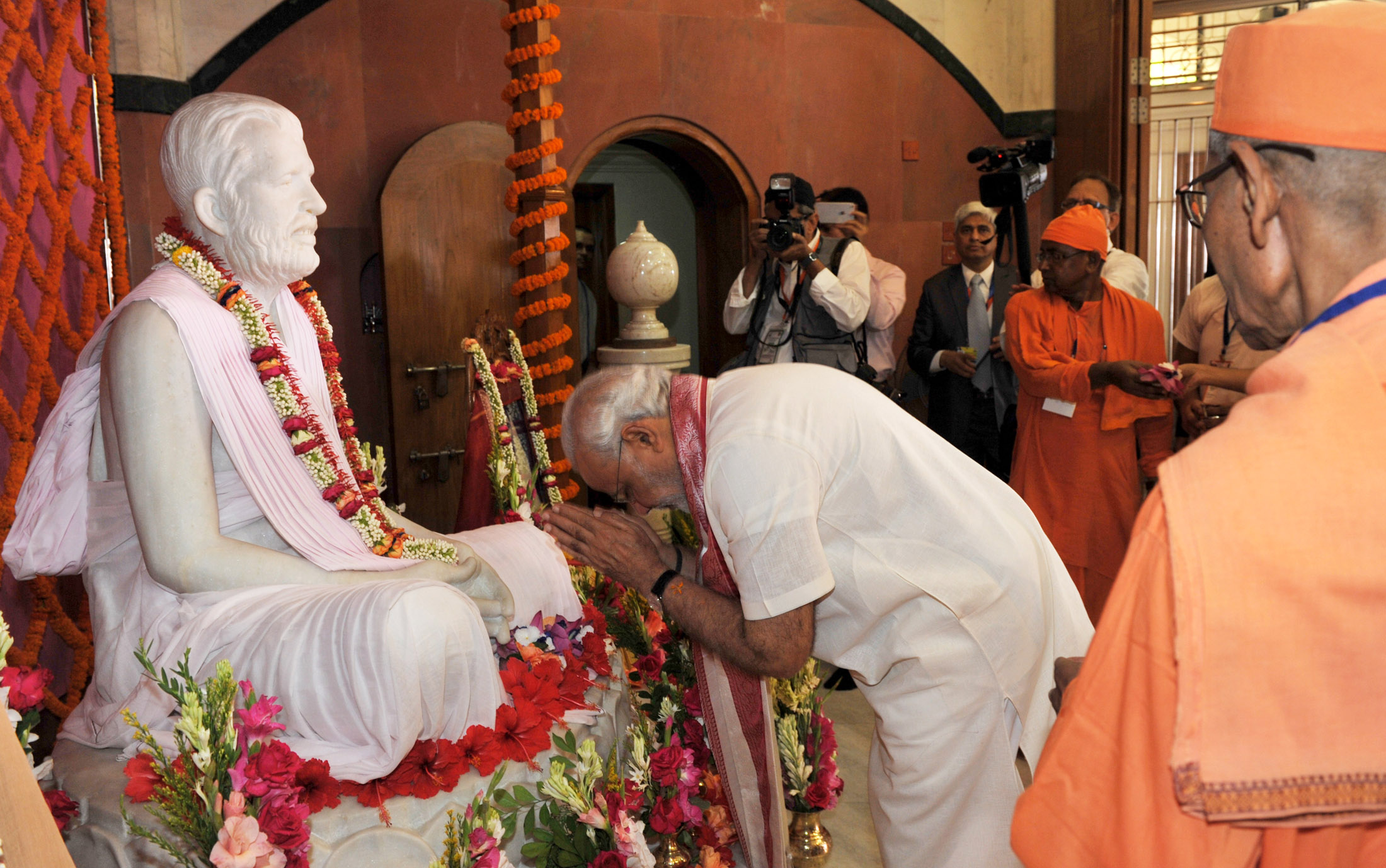
The Prime Minister, Shri Narendra Modi visits Ramakrishna Mission, in Dhaka, Bangladesh on June 07, 2015.

The Ramakrishna Mission has received numerous accolades throughout its lifetime:

- Bhagwan Mahavir Foundation Award (1996).
- Dr. Ambedkar National Award (1996).
- Dr. Bhawar Singh Porte Tribal Service Award (1997–98).
- In 1998 the Mission was awarded the Indian government's prestigious Gandhi Peace Prize.
- Shahid Vir Narayan Singh Award (2001).
- Pt. Ravishankar Shukla Award (2002).
- National Communal Harmony Award (2005).
- The Ramakrishna Mission was selected for an honorary mention of the UNESCO Madanjeet Singh Prize for Promotion of Tolerance and Non violence 2002.
- The Ramakrishna Mission Ashrama Narainpur, Chhattisgarh was jointly selected for the 25th Indira Gandhi Award for National Integration for the year 2009 with musician A.R.Rehman for their services in promoting and preserving national integration.

In a speech made in 1993, Federico Mayor, Director-General of UNESCO, stated:

I am indeed struck by the similarity of the constitution of the Ramakrishna Mission which Vivekananda established as early as 1897 with that of UNESCO drawn up in 1945. Both place the human being at the center of their efforts aimed at development. Both place tolerance at the top of the agenda for building peace and democracy. Both recognize the variety of human cultures and societies as an essential aspect of the common heritage.

== Branch centres ==
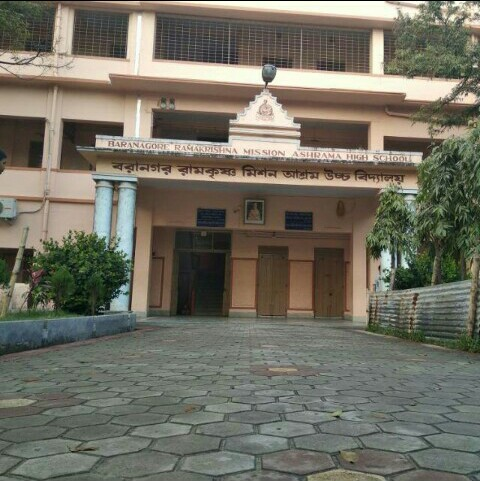
Baranagar Ramakrishna Mission, India

As of March 7, 2025, the Math and Mission have 263 centres all over the world: 200 in India, 26 in Bangladesh, 14 in the United States, two each in Canada and South Africa and one each in Argentina, Australia, Brazil, Fiji, France, Germany, Ireland, Japan, Malaysia, Mauritius, Nepal, Netherlands, Singapore, Sri Lanka, Switzerland, the UK, and Zambia. Besides, there are 44 sub-centres (14 within India, 30 outside India) under different centres.

The centres of the Ramakrishna Order outside India fall into two broad categories. In countries such as Bangladesh, Nepal, Sri Lanka, Fiji and Mauritius, the nature of service activities is very similar to India. In other parts of the world, especially in Europe, Canada, the United States, Japan, and Australia, the work is mostly confined to the preaching of Vedanta, the publication of books and journals and personal guidance in spiritual matters. Many of the centres outside India are called a 'Vedanta Society' or 'Vedanta Centre'.

== Controversies ==
In 1980, in an act that caused "considerable debate" within the order, the mission petitioned the courts to have their organisation and movement declared a non-Hindu minority religion for the purpose of Article 30 of the Indian constitution.

Many generations of monks and others have been of the view that the religion propounded and practised by Ramakrishna and his disciples was different from that practised by the Hindu masses then. They held that Ramakrishna's "Neo-Vedanta" is a truer version of the ideals of Vedanta; therefore, it was honestly felt that this made the followers of Sri Ramakrishna eligible for the legal status of "minority". It is possible that the immediate cause for the Mission’s appeal for minority status was the danger that, unless it could invoke the extra protection the Indian constitution accords to minority religions, the local Marxist government would take control of its educational institutions .

While the Calcutta High Court accepted the Mission's pleas, the Supreme Court of India ruled against it in 1995, citing evidence that the Mission had all the characteristics of a Hindu organisation. The Mission found it advisable to let the matter rest. The wisdom of the attempt by the Mission's leadership to characterise the Mission as non-Hindu was widely questioned within the membership of the organisation itself, and the leadership today embraces the Mission's status as both a Hindu organisation and as an organisation that emphasises the harmony of all faiths.

== See also ==
- List of publications by Ramakrishna Mission
- List of Ramakrishna Mission institutions
- New religious movement
- RKM Football Academy
