= Vijnanananda =

Indian Hindu disciple (1873–1951)

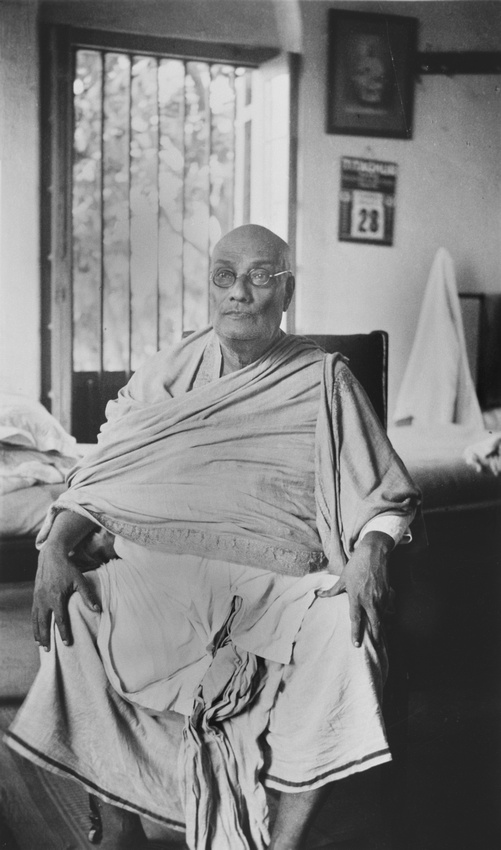

Personal life
- Born: Hariprasanna Chattopadhyay; 30 October 1868 Belgharia, Calcutta, British India
- Died: 25 April 1938 (aged 69) Allahabad, British India

Religious life
- Religion: Hinduism
- Order: Ramakrishna Mission
- Philosophy: Advaita Vedanta

Religious career
- Teacher: Sri Ramakrishna
- Predecessor: Swami Akhandananda
- Successor: Swami Shuddhananda
- Disciples: Swami Atmasthananda, Swami Swahananda, Pravrajika Bhaktiprana and others

Swami Vijnanananda (born Hariprasanna Chattopadhyay; 30 October 1868 – 25 April 1938) was an Indian monk of Ramakrishna order, born in an upper-class family in Etawah, Uttar Pradesh, and was a direct disciple of Ramakrishna. He was an engineer and worked as the District Engineer in the erstwhile State of United Provinces, India. He was a great scholar of Sanskrit with expertise in religio-philosophical works, astronomy, civil engineering etc. He spent considerable time in Allahabad (Prayag) centre of Ramakrishna Math. He became the President of Ramakrishna Mission in 1937. It was under his presidency and direct supervision that the Ramakrishna Temple at Belur Math was constructed and consecrated.

== Biography ==
=== Early life ===
Hariprasanna Chattopadhyaya was born on 30 October 1868, in a respectable family of Belgharia. He had, in all probability, first seen Ramakrishna on 15 September 1879 at Keshab Chandra Sen's spiritual retreat at Belgharia. When studying in the first or second class of a High School, Hariprasanna saw Ramakrishna at Dewan Govinda Mukherji's house. It was on 18 February 1883 that Hariprasanna, then a student of the St. Xavier's College, went to Dakshineswar with his fellow students Sarat, later Saradananda (Sarat Maharaj), and Barada Pal. Ramakrishna showed great love and kindness towards Hariprasanna, which bound the latter indissolubly to the former. Hariprasanna took Ramakrishna to be his Master. He however saw the Master only a few more times in his life, as he was compelled to live at Bankipore in Bihar. Hariprasanna's guardians were not in favour of his meeting Ramakrishna. He stayed back in Dakshineswar one night upon request from the Master, and later he divulged that on that night Sri Ramakrishna granted him special spiritual favours. Vijnanananda later recalled: 'As I approached the Master he asked me to stick out my tongue. When I did so, he drew a figure on it with his finger. My whole body began to tremble, and I felt an unspeakable bliss within.' He was rebuked by his mother and elder sister for the transgression and could not go to see Ramakrishna for a long time, who sent Sarat to bring him along. Ramakrishna made him enter into a deep meditation and gave him intimate knowledge on various facets of spiritual lives.

=== Student life ===
As a student, Hariprasanna was very spirited and would be upset at the sight of any moral turpitude or social injustice. After passing the First Arts examination from Calcutta, Hariprasanna went to Bankipore in Bihar. He graduated from Patna college and went to study Civil Engineering in Pune. During this time Sri Ramakrishna died and Hariprasanna had a vision of Ramakrishna on the night he died. He completed his diploma in civil engineering (Licentiate in Civil Engineering or L.C.E) from Poona College of Science. He did not appear for his final examination deliberately in order to help a poor but meritorious student to secure a job, as in those days only the first or second ranked students could get a Government job and Hariprasanna's classmates were of the opinion that he was to stand first or second. At that time, Hariprasanna was financially dependent on his elder sister's husband. The next year, he passed the examination successfully and landed with a Government job.

=== Pre-monastic life ===
He started his Government service as the district engineer of Ghazipur, Uttar Province. Later he worked in Etawah, Meerut, Bulandshahr and other places. When he was staying in Etawah, Swami Subodhananda stayed with him and from him Hariprasanna got the information about the financial distress of Alambazar Math, and he contributed 60 rupees every month thereafter. Hariprasanna took up the job to save money for his mother's future and after enough money was secured for his mother's maintenance, he left the job to join the Alambazar monastery.

=== Monastic life ===
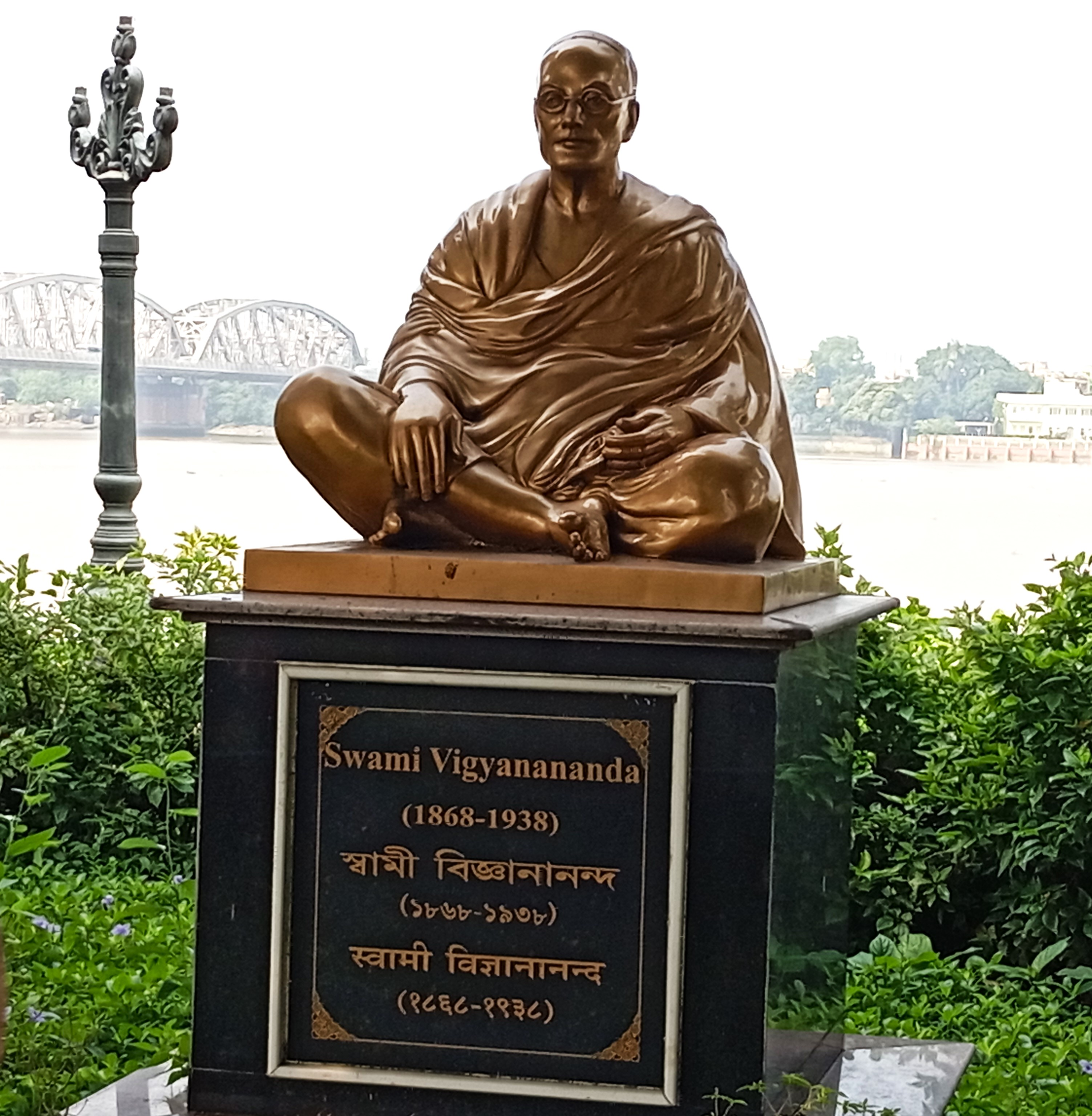
Statue of Swami Vijnanananda, Dakshineswar Kali Temple complex, North 24 Parganas, West Bengal, India

In the year 1896, shortly before Swami Vivekananda returned from the West, Hariprasanna joined the Alambazar Math and there he took his monastic vows and came to be known as Swami Vijnanananda. One of my boys in training has been an executive engineer, in charge of a district. That means a very big position here [in India]. He gave it up like straw! wrote Swami Vivekananda in a letter to Sister Nivedita on 20 June 1897, in the context of Hariprasanna's renunciation. Vijnanananda accompanied Vivekananda on his trip to Rajputana and elsewhere. In 1899, he started working in constructing the buildings in Belur Math. As a wandering monk he visited many places and came to Allahabad in 1900. Here a group of young students had started an organization called Brahmavadin club, for which they solicited his help. Vijanananda made Allahabad his permanent place, and he established a centre of Ramakrishna Mission. He found Ramakrishna Math in Muthiganj in 1908. He lived a life of great austerity, often cooking his own food and spending time in meditation. In 1934, he was appointed as the Vice President of the Ramakrishna Math and Mission and in 1937, its president. During his last few years he travelled extensively and visited many centres of Ramakrishna Math, including those of Rangoon and Colombo. The main Ramakrishna temple in Belur was started in 1935 and in view of the deteriorating health condition of Vijanananda, it was planned to have the installation ceremony just after the completion of the main shrine. On 14 January 1938, Vijanananda performed the dedication of the temple and the consecration of the marble image of Sri Ramakrishna. He paid only one more visit to Belur, on the occasion of Sri Ramakrishna's birthday. He returned to Allahabad, where he died on 25 April 1938.

There is a dormitory named, in his honour, Vijnanananda Dham in Ramakrishna Mission Vidyapith, Deoghar and also in Ramkrishna Mission Vidyapith, Purulia.

=== Major works ===
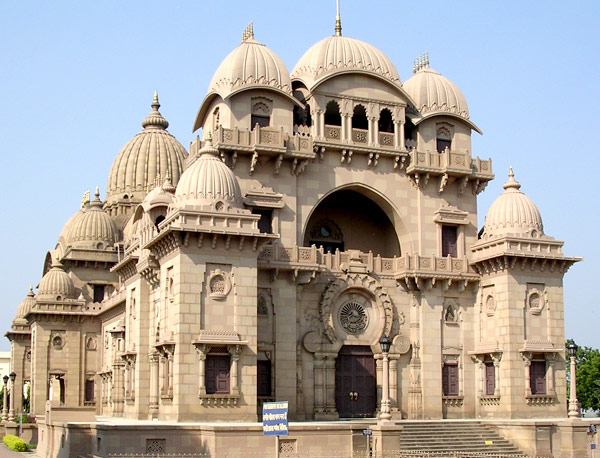
Sri Ramakrishna Temple, Belur Math.

Swami Vijanananda constructed the major buildings of Belur Math, as well as the embankment on the Ganges in front of the main temple. Vivekananda entrusted him with the responsibility of planning a big memorial temple dedicated to Ramakrishna, giving him specific instructions. The Swami, in consultation with a noted European architect of Calcutta, prepared a design of the proposed temple, which was approved by Vivekananda. The temple was planned to have unifying features from all major religions - Church, Mosque and Temple. The plan got shelved after Vivekananda's death in 1902 owing to the paucity of funds. Thirty years after Vivekananda's death, the temple plan was revived when an unexpected financial help was received from some devoted American students. The foundation stone of the temple was laid by Vijanananda, then Vice President of Ramakrishna Math and Mission, in July 1935. The main shrine was opened in his presence in 1938. Hariprasanna Maharaj also established the Ramakrishna Math and Mission in Allahabad and trained many novice monks there. He also supervised the construction of some of the buildings of Ramakrishna Mission Home of Service in Benaras as well as the Swami Vivekananda temple in Belur Math. He also provided valuable advice with regard to the construction of the other buildings of Ramakrishna Math.

=== Spiritual visions ===
While studying in Patna, Hariprasanna had a vision of Ramakrishna, which took place on the day of the latter's passing away in Cossipore in Calcutta in 1886. While staying in Allahabad, he also had a vision of Swami Vivekananda on the day the latter died in 1902. He had several other spiritual visions in various places like Benaras, Kalighat, Sarnath and Triveni in Allahabad.

Vijanananda wrote several books in his lifetime.

- Paramahamsa-charit (Hindi: Sri Ramakrishna Paramahamsadev-ka Samkshipta Jivancharit aur Upadesh): This is Vijnanananda's first book. It is also the first biography of Sri Ramakrishna written by one of his monastic disciples. It was written and published while he was staying at the Brahmavadin Club at Allahabad. The book was published in 1904.
- Jal Sarbaraher Karkhana was a book in Bengali written in 1905 for the students of engineering, engineers, contractors and municipal authorities
- Engineering Sikhsha was a book on Engineering in Bengali
- Sri Surya Sidhhanta was a translation in Bengali of the famous Sanskrit treatise on astronomy and mathematics, Surya Siddhanta, published in 1909
- The Brihajjatakam of Varaha Mihira was an English translation of Brihajjataka, written in Sanskrit by the great astronomer and astrologist Varaha Mihira. It was published in 1912
- The Narada Pancharatram / The Jnanamrita Sara Samhita the important book on Vaishnavism was translated into English in 1921
- The Srimad Devi Bhagavatam, the translation of the Devi-Bhagavata Purana was pubslihed in 1932
- Srimad Valmikiya Ramayanam, was translated by Swami Vijanananda towards the end of his life and the first volume, comprising Baal Kanda and Ayodhya Kanda, was translated by Swami Vijanananda himself

=== Character and legacy ===
While Hariprasanna was in Government service, he had an uncommon integrity and sense of duty. He was also a great scholar and a voracious reader, and had varied intellectual interests. As a monk he normally did not deliver lectures but held informal discussions with devotees and disciples. He also had a great humour sense. Vijnanananda loved seclusion, was frugal in his speech, and avoided giving spiritual instructions. Only after becoming vice president, he initiated a large number of people. In many things, he was just like an innocent child. His frankness was beyond comparison. The same trait made him a very plain-speaking person, but his straight words would not give offence to anyone.

==== Teachings ====
- One should not ask for anything from God, but remain satisfied with whatever He is pleased to give. If you ask for anything He will give a gift which is like a double-edged sword. Real welfare lies in using things properly; wrong use of things brings misfortune.
- Whatever situation one may be in, one can, to some degree, serve the motherland, serve the common people, and above all, serve God. Always have the good of the universe at heart and let this become a part of your daily prayer.
- One reason for the decadence of our country is that in the name of religion, people put forward harmful theories, as a result of which, people lose their faith in religion itself. Simplicity, faithfulness and purity of heart are called for.
- One who can detach his mind from material things will see the light of God and his presence in everything. Worldly attachment draws people away from God and scorch them in the wild fire of the world.

== Books ==
- Swami Vijnanananda: Life and Teachings by Swami Vishwashrayananda ISBN 81-7120-721-9
- God lived with them by Swami Chetanananda ISBN 0-916356-79-5
- The Disciples of Sri Ramakrishna, Advaita Ashrama, Maywati, 1943, page 327

== See also ==
- Swami Advaitananda (Buro Gopal)
- Swami Turiyananda (Hari Maharaj)
- Swami Ramakrishnananda
- Swami Saradananda (Sarat Maharaj)
- Swami Adbhutananda
- Swami Brahmananda
- Swami Niranjananda (Niranjan Maharaj)
- Swami Abhedananda
- Swami Subodhananda
- Swami Vijnanananda
- Swami Premananda (Baburam Maharaj)
- Swami Akhandananda
- Swami Trigunatitananda
- Swami Shivananda
- Swami Yogananda (Yogin Maharaj)
