= Sri Ramakrishna Math, Chennai =

Indian monastic organisation for men

Sri Ramakrishna Math ஸ்ரீராமகிருஷ்ண மடம்
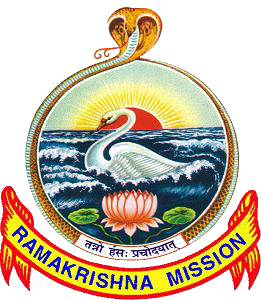
- Emblem

Religion
- Affiliation: Hinduism
- District: Chennai
- Deity: Sri Ramakrishna

Location
- Location: Mylapore, Chennai
- State: Tamil Nadu
- Country: India
- Interactive map of Sri Ramakrishna Math ஸ்ரீராமகிருஷ்ண மடம்
- Coordinates: 13°1′51″N 80°16′2″E

Architecture
- Type: Fusion of Hindu, Islamic, Buddhist, Rajput, Christian styles
- Creator: Ramakrishna Mission
- Completed: 2000

Website
- www.chennaimath.org

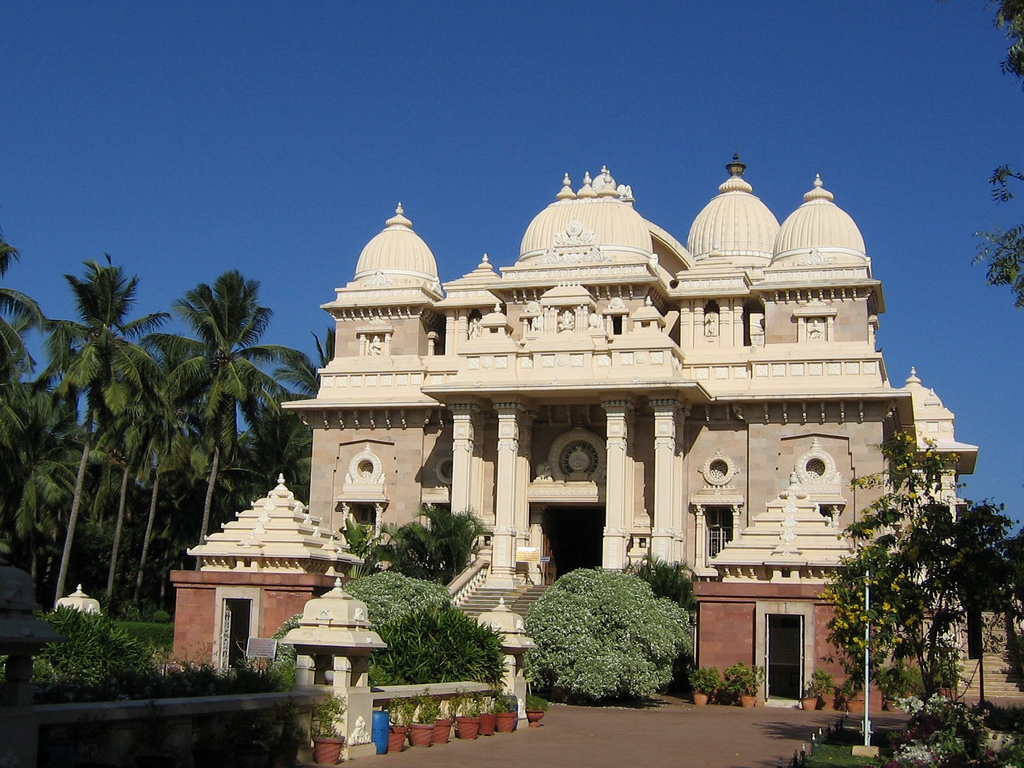
Ramakrishna Math, Chennai

Sri Ramakrishna Math, Chennai is a monastic organisation. The motto of the Ramakrishna Math and Ramakrishna Mission is "For one's own salvation and for the welfare of the world". The math in Chennai is the first branch center of the Ramakrishna Order in Southern India. It was established in 1897 by Swami Ramakrishnananda, one of the direct disciples of Sri Ramakrishna. Besides Swami Ramakrishnananda, the Math was visited by Sri Sarada Devi, Swami Nirmalananda, Swami Shivananda, Swami Abhedananda, Swami Premananda, Swami Niranjanananda, Swami Trigunatitananda, and Swami Vijnanananda.

== History ==
=== Origin ===
In February 1897, Swami Vivekananda returned to Calcutta from the West. At Madras, on the request of his disciples to begin a permanent center, Swamiji had said, "I shall send you one who is more orthodox than the most orthodox Brahmins of South India and who is at the same time incomparable in performing worship, scriptural knowledge and meditation on God." He meant Swami Ramakrishnananda, who was sent in March 1897.

=== Ice House, the First Monastery ===
The Ice House, which is now called Vivekanandar Illam, used to be called Castle Kernan. It is a three-story building on the Triplicane beach that used to belong to a wealthy lawyer named Sri Biligiri Iyengar. It is a place where Swami Vivekananda stayed on his return from the West and was given a historic reception by the citizens of Madras. Sri Iyengar, who was a devotee, now placed the ground floor at the Swami's disposal. Swami Ramakrishnananda moved to the Ice House and started his activities. He built a shrine for Sri Ramakrishna and worshiped there on a regular basis. While at the Ice House, Swami Ramakrishnananda started an orphanage for the destitute children, which has now grown into a large institution called Ramakrishna Mission Students Home, Mylapore. The Ice House served as the first monastery of the Ramakrishna Movement in South India for a period of 9 years.

=== Sri Ramakrishna Math in 1907 ===
Biligiri Iyengar, the owner of the Ice House, died in 1902. Owing to financial problems, the proprietors of the Ice House building decided to auction it in 1906. After the Ice House was sold out, Swami Ramakrishnananda shifted to an outhouse in the rear portion of the Ice House. He spent almost a year in that small room, until the new Math building was built at Mylapore on a piece of land donated by a devotee. Then Swami moved into the new building on 17 November 1907.

This Math building constructed by Swami Ramakrishnananda no longer exists. It was unfortunate that within two years of its construction, extensive cracks developed in the roof of the building. One of the cracks was above the Shrine Room, and due to a sudden rainfall one night, Swami Ramakrishnananda had to hold an umbrella over the Master's photo in the Shrine the whole night.

Soon after Swami Ramakrishnananda left Madras and Swami Sharvananda took charge in 1912. This building was demolished and the present two-storeyed building with a spacious front hall was constructed by 1917.

=== Sri Ramakrishna Math, 1917–2000 ===
On 4 August 1916, Swami Brahmananda, the first president of the Ramakrishna Order and a direct disciple of Sri Ramakrishna, who had come on his second visit to Madras, laid the foundation stone for the new Math building. Thanks to the able supervision of Sri A. Ramalinga Iyer, superintending engineer, the construction work progressed rapidly, and on 27 April 1917, 8 months later, the inauguration ceremony was performed by Swami Brahmananda himself. At his instance, the building was dedicated to Swami Ramakrishnananda, who died in 1911 in Calcutta.

Swami Brahmananda stayed in this building in a room to the southeast on the ground floor. He used to walk inside the prayer hall, often touching the black stone pillars, going into high spiritual moods on several occasions.

Initially, the building consisted of a large hall and a few rooms only on the ground floor. Later, some rooms were built on the first floor, running parallel to either side of the prayer hall. The shrine was located upstairs, but there was no partition between the altar of Sri Guru Maharaj and the meditation room in which the devotees sat. The devotees sat at the feet of Sri Guru Maharaj. As this was felt to be inconvenient for conducting the worship, in 1938, some modifications were made to the shrine area, which was moved back a few feet and separated by bars from the meditation area. This provided much-needed space both for conducting the puja and other services at the altar and for accommodating the devotees (with a seating capacity of 40) in front. A small gopuram was also added later. On the southern side of the shrine, one room was used as a shayana griha for Sri Guru Maharaj and the adjoining room had large portraits of Holy Mother Sri Sarada Devi, Swami Vivekananda, Swami Brahmananda, and Swami Ramakrishnananda.

The prayer hall in the Old Temple was a witness to many important events. In addition to regular worship, the shrine has hosted numerous spiritual and cultural events over the past 80 years. All the seva (ritual service) to Sri Ramakrishna was done here as per the norms and procedures laid down by Swami Ramakrishnananda. Swami Brahmananda ordained Swami Yatiswarananda into Sannyasa in this shrine.

Swami Vireswarananda, the 10th president of the order, was invested with brahmacharya vows here. Three other direct disciples of Ramakrishna Swami Shivananda (3rd president of the Ramakrishna Order), Swami Nirmalananda, and Swami Vijnanananda (5th president of the Ramakrishna Order) also stayed in this building during their visits. Several eminent monks of the order, such as Swami Ashokananda, Swami Prabhavananda, Swami Akhilananda, and many others, have lived and performed intense spiritual practices in this building.

With a seating capacity of 300, the main hall was the place where most weekly and Jayanthi day discourses were held for several decades. This was the main hall for all important pujas, public meetings and celebrations until 1963. In the year 1920-1921, Durga puja was conducted here. For this purpose, at the behest of Swami Brahmananda, Ramlal Chattopaddhyaya, the nephew of Sri Ramakrishna, brought the image of Mother Durga from Calcutta. Durga Puja held here again in 1952, 1953 and 1954, as shown in the image.

The centenary celebrations of Sri Ramakrishna (1936), Holy Mother Sri Sarada Devi (1953), and Swami Vivekananda (1963) were held in this hall. Many national leaders, such as C. Rajagopalachari, Morarji Desai, K. Kamaraj, and others, have spoken on various occasions. On the occasion of the 150th birthday celebration of Holy Mother Sri Sarada Devi, a fiber glass statue of the Holy Mother was placed here in 2004 after taking it around in a procession in various parts of Tamil Nadu.

The Old Temple has been used for meditation, occasional classes and meetings for students and devotees since 2000, after the new Universal Temple of Sri Ramakrishna was consecrated in the same premises, on the site adjacent to the library.

=== The Universal Temple (from 2000) ===
Sri Ramakrishna Math completed 100 years of service in 1997. The shrine of Sri Ramakrishna set up in 1917 was too small to accommodate the growing number of devotees. The idea of a universal temple was conceived and Swami Bhuteshanandaji Maharaj, the 12th president of Ramakrishna Math and Ramakrishna Mission, laid the foundation stone for the Universal Temple on 1 December 1994. It was realized by temple architect G. Venkataramana Reddy. On 7 February 2000, the temple was dedicated by Swami Ranganathananda, the 13th president of the Ramakrishna Order.

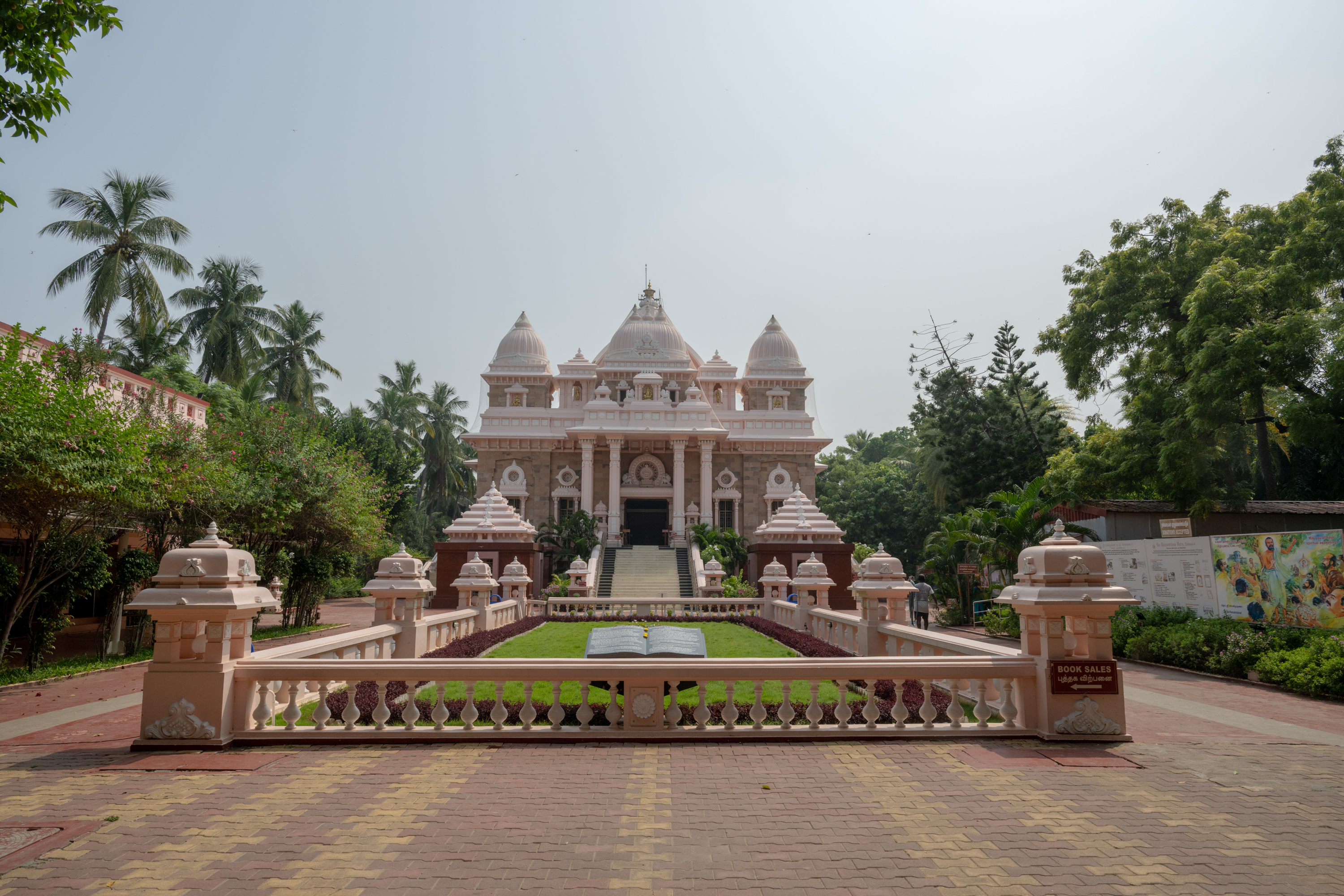
The Universal Temple, Sri Ramakrisha Math, Chennai.

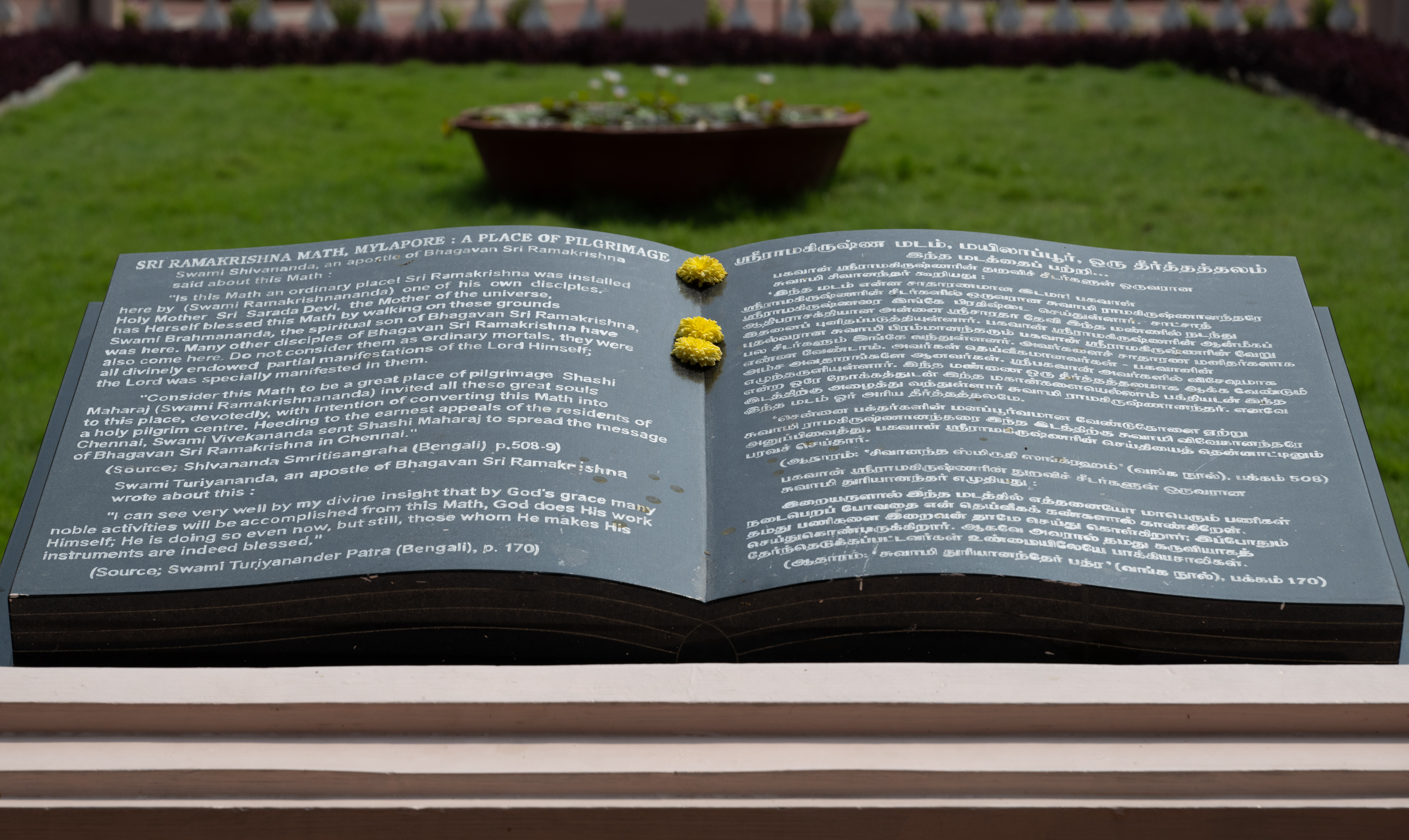
Picture of a plaque in the front garden of The Universal temple at Sri Ramakrishna Math, Chennai. Picture taken by Sundar Karthikeyan on Oct 27, 2024.

After Swami Ramakrishnananda, the monastery was headed by Swami Sharvananda (1911–26), Swami Yatiswarananda (1926–33), Swami Saswatananda (1936–44), Swami Kailasananda (1944–71), Swami Tapasyananda (1971–91), Swami Smaranananda (1991-1995), Swami Gautamananda (1995-2024).

== Activities ==
=== Celebrations ===
The Birthdays (according to the hindu calendar) of Sri Ramakrishna, Sri Sarada Devi, Swami Vivekananda and Swami Ramakrishnananda are celebrated in a grand manner each year. The Birthdays of Gautama Buddha, Jesus Christ, Adi Shankara, Ramanuja and Chaitanya Mahaprabhu are also celebrated every year. The birthday celebrations are marked with special Puja, Homa, Chanting, Bhajans, Musical programmes and Lectures. Special puja is also performed on Guru Purnima, Rama Navami, Ganesh Puja, Shivratri, Krishna Janmashtami, Navaratri, Kali Puja, Durga Puja, Lakshmi Puja, Saraswati Puja and other auspicious days. As part of the National youth day celebrations, this year All India level Short film contest has been announced.

=== Publication ===
Today, the Madras Math is the largest publication house of the Ramakrishna Order. The Madras Math currently publishes 292 titles in English, 333 in Tamil and 17 in Sanskrit/English.

The Madras Math published its first major book – Swami Vivekananda's Inspired Talks, in 1909. In the same year, was published Swami Ramakrishnananda's Universe and Man. In 1909, came his next book Krishna: Pastoral and King-maker followed by The Soul of Man in 1910.

In 1912, a translation of the first volume of the Bengali Sri Sri Ramakrishna Kathamrita under the title The Gospel of Sri Ramakrishna was published. About a decade later, Swami Ashokananda translated the second volume. Swami Sharvananda translated eight principal Upanishads and the series become most popular. In 1920, he translated the first part of Swami Saradananda's Sri Sri Ramakrishna Leeelaprasanga. Its English title was Sri Ramakrishna, the Great Master (1952).

The complete text of the Gospel of Sri Ramakrishna, translated by Swami Nikhilananda was published in 1944 and of Sri Ramakrishna the Great Master, translated by Swami Jagadananda in 1952. Swami Tapasyananda translated into English a great many Sanskrit texts, including Srimad Bhagavata published in 4 volumes in the year 1980. Another of his books, The Bhakti Schools of Vedanta (1990), has been much acclaimed by scholars.

The Madras Math publishes 2 monthly journals: The Vedanta Kesari in English and Sri Ramakrishna Vijayam in Tamil. The Vedanta Kesari was started in 1914 and has over the years built up a good reputation for its authenticity and scholarship. Sri Ramakrishna Vijayam, started in 1921, has the largest circulation among religious journals in Tamil today.

The Telugu publication wing of the Ramakrishna Order was in Chennai since its inception till 2006 when it was transferred to Hyderabad. During that period, all the Telugu books and the Telugu Monthly Sri Ramakrishna Prabha used to be published from Chennai.

=== Educational Work ===
The Math's educational activities were initiated by Swami Ramakrishnananda even during the Ice House days. Moved by the pitiable condition of a few boys who had lost all their relatives in plague epidemic, Swami Ramakrishnananda felt that something must be done for the relief and rehabilitation of this type of orphans. With the meager means at his command he had already given shelter in the Math to two orphan students. He exhorted two of his young and earnest devotees, Sri Ramaswami Iyengar and Sri Ramanujachari to take up the responsibility of running an orphanage. A humble beginning was made on 17 February 1905 with seven inmates housed in a small rented house on Kesavaperumal Southward street at Mylapore. Thanks to the dedicated labour of Ramu and Ramanuju, aided by a band of selfless workers and sympathetic public, the orphanage was soon able to take in more boys. It changed its quarters five times before shifting to a plot of land donated by Sri S.G. Srinivasachariar. The foundation stone for the new building was laid by Swami Brahmananda on 16 May 1917 and the orphanage moved to its new building in May 1921. In 1922 a residential high school was started so that the orphans could study within the campus itself.

Swami Ramakrishnananda was also the inspiration behind the National Girls School, George Town. The Math took over its management in 1921. In 1932, a school for boys was started at T. Nagar. The Girls High School, Sri Sarada Vidyalaya, at T. Nagar was taken over by the Math in 1938, and additional wings like an elementary school, a training school and hostels were incorporated. In June 1946, was started the Vivekananda College at Mylapore.

Since the educational activity has expanded enormously, the institutions have been divided into separate Ramakrishna Mission centres for facilitating efficient administration. Under the Madras Math's direct control there are at present:

- Sri Ramakrishna Math Vivekananda Centenary Girls Higher Secondary School with 670 students.
- Sri Ramakrishna Math National School Chennai – 79 with 520 students.
- A public library with 32,000 books and 300 periodicals.
- A Book bank providing academic books for 300 engineering students.

=== Medical Service ===
- A charitable allopathic-cum-homeopathic dispensary with general, dental, eye, ENT, surgical, X-ray, ultrasound scanning, paediatrics, ECG, gynaecology, physiotherapy and laboratory sections, and clinics for TB and diabetes. About 220,000 cases are treated annually.
- A weekly mobile medical unit, which treats 10,000 cases annually
- Prevention of Disability (POD) and rehabilitation camps for 300 Leprosy Affected Persons (LAPS)
- Regular eye camps in nearby villages

=== Relief and Rehabilitation ===
The history of the Ramakrishna Order's relief services is as old as that of the Mission itself. Besides their multifarious permanent constructive works, from their very inception, the Ramakrishna Math and the Ramakrishna Mission have been ever ready to promptly organise ameliorative and healing services whenever the nation has been faced with sudden calamities caused by freaks of nature, follies of men, or scourges of epidemics. Its relief activities have also extended well beyond Indian borders.

For the 1897 famine in Bengal, Swami Ramakrishnananda appealed for funds in the Brahmavadin and sent a substantial amount for the relief work. In 1928 and, twenty years later, in 1948, when some huts caught fire at Mylapore, the Math organised prompt aid and relief. The Math created a colony for the 100 affected families with the help of plot of land given by the Government. It was named Ramakrishnapuram. The following are the major relief activities undertaken by the Math.

Month/Year	Affected Villages/District	Relief Type
1924	Coimbatore, Bhavani, Sathyamangalam and Other districts	Flood relief
1927	Nellore	Cyclone relief
1932	Chengalpattu and Thanjavur	Flood relief
1941	Thanjavur District	Cyclone relief
1955	Thanjavur and Ramnad districts	Flood relief
1957	Ramnad district	Riots
Nov 1957	Sulurpet in Nellore District	Flood relief
1961	Thirukattupalli and Thiruvaiyaru in Thanjavur District	Flood relief
1962	Lalgudi in Trichy	Fire relief
1965	Rameswaram and Dhanushkodi	Cyclone relief
1972–73	Bhavani in Coimbatore district	Flood relief
Nov 1977	Thanjavur, Trichy and Pudukottai	Flood relief
Nov 1985	Vyasarpadi, Triplicane, Velachery, Kotturpuram and Perambur	Flood relief
Jan 1993	8 Villages in Kanyakumari District	Flood relief
Sep 1993	Puduveetuvilai, Keelmadichal & Kanchinagar villages in Kanyakumari District	Cyclone relief
Dec 1993	47 villages across Tamil Nadu	Cyclone relief
Dec 2004 – May 2005	Chengalpattu, Chennai, Nagapattinam, Cuddalore, Kanchipuram, Villupuram and Kanyakumari District	tsunami relief
2008	Thanjavur and Tiruvarur Districts	Flood relief
2010	Tiruvarur and Nagapattinam Districts	Flood relief

=== Rural Development ===
- Sri Ramakrishna Math, with assistance from Direct-Relief International and GlaxoSmithKline runs a One Year Nurse Assistant Training programme. The programme was started in the year 2004 following the Indian Ocean tsunami. A need was felt to empower the local young women of the tsunami affected districts. So far, 1200 nurses have graduated in the last four years and currently 300 girl students are undergoing training in various Nursing Training Institutions in Chennai.
- The Math conducts free computer training courses for rural girls in Tiruvallur District.

== Gallery ==
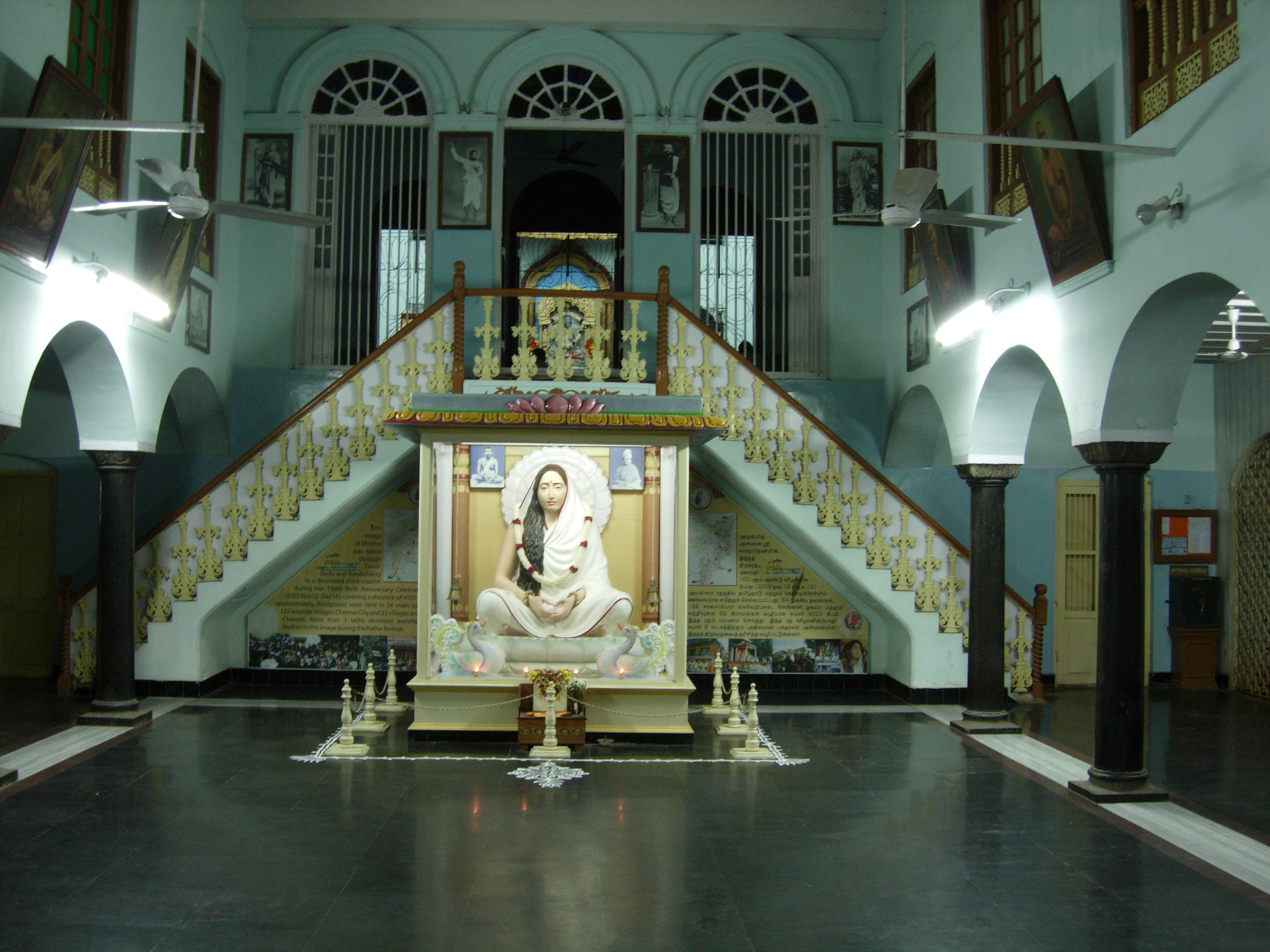
Prayer Hall in Old Temple
