= Nirmalananda =

Disciple of Ramakrishna (1863–1938)

Swami Nirmalananda
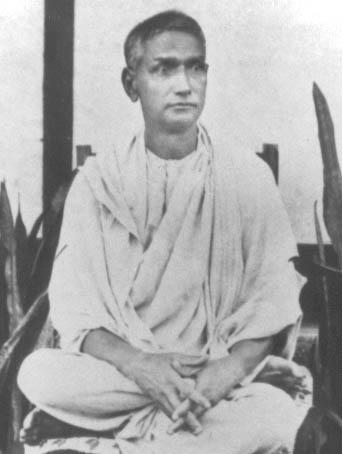
- Swami Nirmalananda

Personal life
- Born: Tulasi Charan Dutta; 23 December 1863 Calcutta, Bengal Presidency, British India
- Died: 26 April 1938 (aged 74) Ottapalam, Kerala, British India

Religious life
- Religion: Hinduism
- Philosophy: Advaita Vedanta

Religious career
- Teacher: Ramakrishna

Nirmalananda, born as Tulasi Charan Dutta in Calcutta, was a direct disciple of Ramakrishna, the 19th-century mystic and Hindu saint from India, and took Sanyasa (monastic vows) from Vivekananda along with Brahmananda and others. He was initiated by Sri Ramakrishna, on which fact a few latter-day antagonists tried to cast doubt in the Bangalore Court, but into which question the Court refused to get into. Nirmalananda played a key role in establishing Ramakrishna Math and Mission chiefly in South India, in Kerala and Bangalore and Tamil Nadu and also in the USA (in Brooklyn), Burma and Bangladesh (Life of Swami Nirmalananda and old issues of Prabuddha Bharata).

== Biography ==
=== Initial days ===
Tulasi Charan Dutta was born on 23 December 1863, in Bosepara Lane in the Bagbazar area of Calcutta, to Debnath Dutta and Thakamani Devi. He was the youngest among his brothers. At a very young age he was delicate in health, and was accordingly sent to school at a relatively late age. His family had establishments in Benaras and Calcutta. Tulasi lost his mother at the age of 10 years. Subsequently, he got admitted to the Bengali Tolla High School in Benaras and became the classmate of Hariprasanna Chattopadhyay who subsequently came to be known as Vijnanananda, another great monk of Ramakrishna Mission and a direct disciple of Ramakrishna. At home he learnt Sanskrit. And later he taught the Upanishads, Brahmasutras and Gita to the Brahmacharins at Belur, and he was also able to converse fluently in Sanskrit with the scholars who visited South India. Tulasi also visited Trailanga in Benaras. His father died in his Calcutta residence in November 1877, while Tulasi was still in Benaras. Thereafter, Tulasi came to Calcutta to appear for the Entrance examination of Calcutta University. He also engaged himself in physical training and became an able gymnast and athlete, and also trained other young men in physical exercises. He passed the Entrance examination in 1883 and got a certificate of appreciation and a medal from Raja of Talcher.

He first met Ramakrishna in the house of his neighbour Balaram Bose, a lay disciple, in 1882, when Nirmalananda was eighteen years of age. He visited Dakshineswar temple to meet Ramakrishna, first with his friend Harinath and later alone. In the second visit he met Ramakrishna. Tulasi used to meet Ramakrishna occasionally in the house of Balaram Bose and got his initiation from him. He also met Ramakrishna when the latter was lying ill in Cossipore garden house. After the death of their master the a few of the future monastic disciples, led by Narendranath Dutta, later Vivekananda formed the Baranagar Math which Tulasi would visit now and then. The brother disciples also used to spend some time in his house in Bagbazar. Later in early 1887. Tulasi joined the Baranagar Math as a permanent resident and became the right hand of Sashi (Swami Ramakrishnananda).

=== Monastic life ===
Tulasi, like several of his other brother disciples, got his monastic vow from Vivekananda and took the new name Nirmalananda (Nirmala – without blemish/pure, Ananda – bliss, "The pure and untarnished joy and bliss"). Nirmalananda assisted Ramakrishnananda in serving the brother disciples in both Baranagar and Alambazar Math and was a tireless worker.

==== Travels ====
In 1888, Nirmalananda went out as an itinerant monk along with a few of his brother disciples. He first went to Kamarpukur, the birthplace of the Master to stay for a few days with Sarada Devi, the wife of Ramakrishna. They went to Ghazipur by foot and met monk Pavhari Baba and Hariprasanna, later Vijnanananda. They also went to Benaras, Ayodhya, Rishikesh, Uttarkashi, Devaprayag, Kedarnath and trekked up to Gomukh. On their way back they met Vivekananda in Rishikesh. Later he travelled with Sarada Devi, Saradananda, and Yogananda to Koilwar on Sone river. He stayed for some time in caves of the Himalayas during winter, and travelled in Tibetan hills. Later in 1899 he travelled to Rajputana for famine relief work. At the time of the death of Vivekananda he was in the Himalayas. After his return from the Americas he travelled first to East Bengal and Assam and then to Kashmir. That was his first visit to Kerala, where he would spend his later life. Nirmalananda travelled to Trivandrum in response to the invitation of the Vedanta society of Trivandrum in 1911. There he stayed for some time and delivered several lectures. He travelled to Kanyakumari the same year. Early next year he went to Ootacamund in Nilgiris to preside over the third anniversary of Vivekananda Association, Kaity. He also met a disciple of Ramakrishna from Malabar, and on his invitation visited Vatakara in British Malabar. From there he travelled to Calicut; in 1914 he travelled to Ottapalam, which was to be his future place of work. He travelled once or twice a year to Kerala and Malabar to establishing ashramas, meet devotees and deliver lectures.

==== Relations with Vivekananda ====
When Vivekananda returned to India from the West in 1897, Nirmalananda was very devoted to the leader and rendered many a service to him, like cooking for him, working as his private secretary and tending to his needs. Tulasi Maharaj arranged for the initiation of Shuddhananda, from Vivekananda., Tulasi often accompanied the leader in playing percussion instruments like Pakhawaj while the latter sang devotional songs. He was deeply affected by the demise of Vivekananda in 1902.

=== Major work ===
On 10 February 1901, when Vivekananda wanted to register the Ramakrishna Math as a Trust, while all other living disciples of Ramakrishna agreed, Nirmalananda and Adbhutananda refused to become Trustees. At Vivekananda's and other disciples' insistence, Nirmalananda became the assistant secretary of the newly established Ramakrishna Math and Mission. After the demise of Vivekananda, Nirmalananda was sent to Americas by Brahmananda in 1903 upon a call from Abhedananda. He taught Yoga classes in New York, and started a Vedanta centre at Brooklyn. He also gave lectures and taught Sanskrit and the Upanishads. He stayed in America for two and half years, then returned to India, when Brahmananda called him for 'the regeneration of the Motherland'. Nirmalananda helped in developing and establishing the Ramakrishna Mission centres in Bangalore and Kerala. He was also instrumental in getting Sarada Devi to Bangalore Ramakrishna Math. In 1904 the Bangalore centre was established by Ramakrishnananda and an Ashrama was built there by Brahmananda, the then president. Nirmalananda was sent to head the Bangalore Ashrama in 1909. He delivered many lectures and also looked after the day-to-day affairs of the Ashrama. In 1911 when Sarada Devi travelled to Rameswaram, Nirmalananda brought her to Bangalore for a visit. The Ashrama in Haripad was opened on 4 May 1913. Nirmalananda established strict observance of the end of all caste-based discrimination, usual in Kerala at the time, in this Ashrama., In 1916 Nirmalananda began constructing an ashrama near Trivandrum. He desired to have the foundation stone laid by Brahmananda, president of Belur Math. On 26 November, Nirmalananda and Brahmananda reached Kerala. They travelled to various places including Ottapalam, Kottayam, Haripad, Quilon, and reached Trivandrum on 8 December, and the next day Brahmananda laid the foundation for the ashrama.,

In March 1924 the main building of the ashrama in Trivandrum was completed. The consecration was on 7 March, the birthday anniversary of Ramakrishna. In 1925 he stayed in Trivandrum Ashram for about a month and gave Sanyasa to seven disciples namely Nrisimhananda, Ojasananda, Oorjasananda, Puranjanananda, Balakrishnananda, Arjavananda and Umeshananda. In December 1926, The Ramakrishna Niranjana Ashrama was opened in Ottapalam. Foundation stone for Ashrama at Coorg was laid on 7 February 1927. He also established schools for the education of children in Palaparam – sarada Vidyalaya and Niranjana Vidyalaya, and continued acting against caste discrimination. He also gave Sannyas or the supreme vow of renunciation to many of his followers and attendants. He started the Kumari Puja and worked for the betterment of women of Namboodiri caste who were socially oppressed.

In 1929, When a break-away group of monks and devotees of the Ramakrishna Mission, started the Ramakrishna Sarada Math at Baghbazar, Swami Nirmalananda accepted their request to take the post of being its first president. The corresponding philanthropic mission was named Vivekananda Mission. The motive for accepting the Presidency might have been to heal the wounds caused by this dissention and to act as a bridge between the dissenting groups. By a quirk of Providence, this act caused further disquiet in the minds of some minor Trustees of the Ramakrishna Mission, and led to them filing a lawsuit against Swami Nirmalananda in the Bangalore Court. (as given below)

Later there were differences in the approach to the Mission's Work between Swami Nirmalananda and some of the younger administrators in Belur Math which resulted in a lawsuit being filed by Belur Math in Bangalore Court in 1930, asking the court to state that the Ramakrishna Math in Bangalore was a branch centre of the Belur Math. After five years, in 1935, the court ruled that Ramakrishna Math, Bangalore was indeed a branch of Belur Math, but it also gave the option to Swami Nirmalananda to continue as President of the Bangalore monastery and mandated that a Committee consisting of suitable citizens be formed who would be aiding the President. Swami Nirmalananda chose to leave the place rather than working in the shadow of such a Committee and went to Trivandrum centre of the Ramakrishna Mission and later retired to the monastery at the Ottapalam Centre of the Ramakrishna Mission.

=== Characteristics ===
He performed many of the household chores in the monasteries and also taught Sanskrit grammar and other scriptures to the new members in the Math. He nursed sick patients, including those suffering from contagious diseases. When the new Math was established in Belur, Tulasi Maharaj worked in gardens and fields together with the new inmates, helped in training them in physical exercises, taught them scriptures and used to play with them. He played musical instruments and would often accompany Vivekananda's singing on percussion instruments.

=== Death ===
Nirmalananda died in April 1938 in the branch centre of the Ramakrishna Math near Ottapalam in Kerala. This centre is now administered by friends of Ramakrishna Mission. His Obituary Notice appears in the 1940 General Report of the Ramakrishna Mission. A Memorial Temple to him was built the monks of devotees of the Ramakrishna Mission and was consecrated by Swami Saswathananda, the then President of the Ramakrishna Math and a Trustee of the Ramakrishna Math and a Member of the Governing Body of the Ramakrishna Mission.

=== Quotes ===
- To make real progress in meditation, a part of the mind should always be given to God, whatever be the work you are engaged in. If you are able to do that, your mind will get concentrated as soon as you sit down for meditation. The thought of God can be kept continuously under all conditions, by a little practice. Suppose you have a tooth-ache. Are you not able to attend to all your daily duties in spite of the continuous pain. Similarly by a little practice you will reach a state in which you cannot give up the thought of God even for a single moment.
