= Akhandananda =

Hindu religious leader

Swami Akhandananda
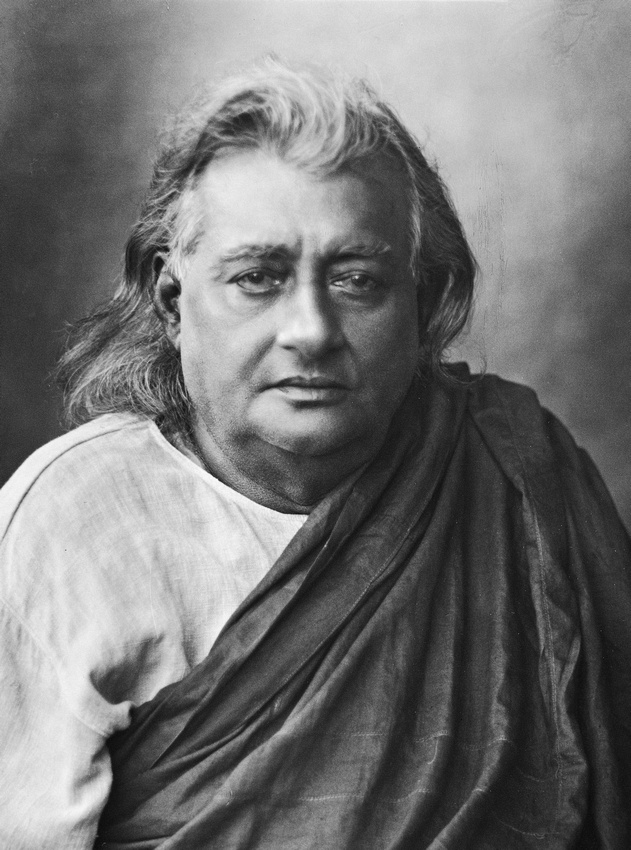
- Akhandananda (1864 -1937 )

Personal life
- Born: Gangadhar Ghatak (Gangophadyay); 30 September 1864 Ahiritola, Calcutta, Bengal presidency, British India
- Died: 7 February 1937 (aged 72) Belur Math, Belur, Bengal presidency, British India
- Honors: 3rd president of Ramakrishna math and mission

Religious life
- Religion: Hinduism
- Philosophy: Advaita Vedanta

Religious career
- Teacher: Sri Ramakrishna
- Predecessor: Swami Shivananda
- Successor: Swami Vijnanananda
- Disciples: Swami Sarvagatananda and others

Quotation

The poor, the illiterate, the ignorant, the afflicted - let these be your God. Know that service to these is the highest religion.

Swami Akhandananda (1864–1937) was a swami and direct disciple of Sri Ramakrishna, a 19th-century mystic. He was the third president of the Ramakrishna Mission.

== Early life ==
=== Initial Years ===
Akhandananda was born as Gangadhar Ghatak (Gangopadhyay) on 30 September 1864, in Ahiritola area of western Kolkata, to Srimanta Gangopadhyay and Vamasundari Devi. He came from a respectable Brahmin family. He was orthodox in nature and was dubbed as "oldish" by Ramakrishna. From his very childhood, Gangadhar was so compassionate that he once gave his own shirt to a poor classmate whose shirt was torn. Without telling his parents, he would give food to beggars. He was a strong moralist and always helped his wayward friends. Gangadhar was a vivacious, handsome boy in childhood. Gifted with prodigious memory, Gangadhar mastered the English alphabet in one day. Gangadhar first met Ramakrishna, the famous mystic and saint whom he later adopted as his Master, in 1884, when he was nineteen years old, in the temple of Dakshineswar. He visited Ramakrishna for the first time in the company of his friend Harinath (later Turiyananda). He had first seen Ramakrishna in the house of Dinanath Bose at a very young age. Ramakrishna did not want him to be over orthodox and therefore introduced him to Narendranath Dutta (later Vivekananda). Gangadhar was favourably impressed with Narendranath and became devoted to him, a devotion which lasted throughout his life and which later prompted him to take up service as the primary work over spiritual practices. During his visits to Dakshineswar, Gangadhar received instructions on meditation from Ramakrishna.

=== Pre monastic days ===
Gangadhar's father found a job for Gangadhar in a merchant's office. Gangadhar worked there a few days and then gave it up. He then fully engaged himself in spiritual disciplines and service to the master. Gangadhar served Ramakrishna during the illness of the latter. After the death of Ramakrishna, when the Baranagar Math was formed by Narendranath and other brother disciples, Gangadhar renounced his family life and embraced a life of travel with consent from his family and set foot for the Himalayas. Steeped in Vedanta and his own experience, his mind ever pined to be absorbed in the bliss of the Himalayan solitude. In 1887, after visiting Kedarnath and Badrinath, he travelled to Tibet where he lived in Lhasa and elsewhere for three years, returning to India in 1890. Gangadhar's entire travel account is recorded in his book Smriti-Katha (From Holy Wanderings to The Service of God in Man). He travelled hundreds of miles in the mountains of the Himalayas without carrying any money or extra clothing.

=== Life as a Monk ===
==== Travels ====
Gangadhar took his monastic vow in 1890, in Baranagar Math and in the presence of SwamiVivekananda, and was given the name of "Akhandananda" (Akhanda - undifferentiated, ananda - bliss, one who finds supreme bliss in the undifferentiated nature of the Truth). After his return, he had frequent correspondence with Vivekananda, then at Ghazipur, who induced him to join him in travelling in some places of the Himalayas because of the latter's experience and familiarity in those terrains. Accordingly, Akhandananda came to Baranagore monastery, and after spending a few happy months with his brother-disciples, sharing his experiences with them, he set out in July 1890, with Vivekananda on a pilgrimage to the Himalayas. Visiting important places on the way they reached Almora, but the illness of one or the other plagued their journey, and they returned via Tehri to Dehra Dun, from where Akhandananda proceeded to Meerut for treatment. Vivekananda also joined him in Meerut, and they met some other brother disciples. After five months of association, Vivekananda left them and Akhandananda followed him surreptitiously, going from one province to another in his search, but everywhere he narrowly missed meeting him. Finally, he met Vivekananda again in Kutch where Swami Vivekananda entreated him to follow a separate course. Accordingly, Akhandananda continued his pilgrimage separately.

==== Intellectual Pursuits ====
During his days of wandering in the Himalayas, he studied Avadhuta Gita at Srinagar in Garhwal. In 1891, while resting at Etawah, he spent most of his time reading the Mahabhashya, Patanjali's voluminous commentary on Panini's Sanskrit grammar, as well as Sridhara Swami’s commentary on the Bhagavadgita. In Jamnagar in 1892, he studied the Charaka-Sushruta Samhita with the help of the Sanskrit lexicon Shabdartha Chandrika Kosha and also Shukla Yajur Veda. In Udaipur, he read the Vedantic text of Panchadasi. He also learned Hindi grammar from Bhasha Bhaskara, to correct his Hindi pronunciation. In Indore, he completed a reading of the entire Valmiki Ramayana over a period of eighteen days. Later in Mahula he undertook a critical study of the Yogavasishtha Ramayana.

==== Relationship with Vivekananda and Sarada Devi ====
Akhandananda was an ardent follower of Vivekananda, who called him lovingly as Ganges. He was also devoted to Sarada Devi. When hard work in Murshidabad took a toll on his health, she had him brought to Calcutta for treatment and took special care of him.

==== Final Years ====
Akhandananda became the vice president of Ramakrishna Math and Mission in 1925 and the third president after the demise of Swami Shivananda in 1934. He initiated a number of people after assuming office. However, he continued to stay at Sargachhi.

Akhandananda also initiated Madhav Sadashiv Golwalkar, the second sarsanghachalak of the Rashtriya Swayamsevak Sangh.

He participated in the celebration of the Birth Centenary of Ramakrishna in 1936 in Calcutta.

In February 1937 he fell ill and was brought to Calcutta. He died in Belur Math on 7 February 1937.

== Service ==
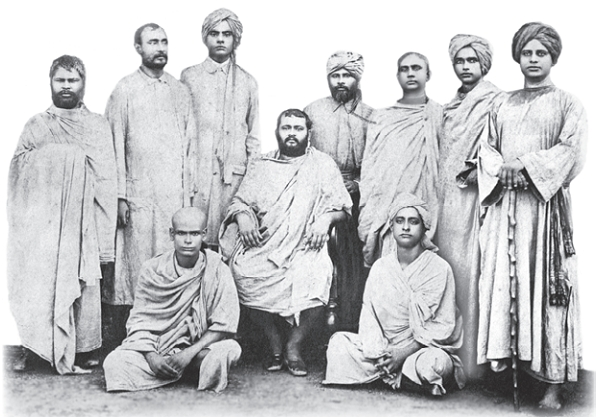
Alambazar Math, 1896 (farewell to Swami Abhedananda leaving for the US)(from left) standing: Swami Adbhutananda, Yogananda, Abhedananda, Trigunatitananda, Turiyananda, Nirmalananda, and Niranjanananda; sitting: Swamis Subodhananda, Brahmananda (on chair), and Akhandananda

Akhandananda was the first monk of the Ramakrishna order, who gave shape to the cherished desire of Vivekananda to begin rural development work—even before the Mission was established. The distressing sorrows and suffering of the masses pulled him down to the plains, and to them, he became a harbinger of peace and succour. Sacrificing his Himalayan bliss, he chose to be with poor. Akhandananda practised till the very end of his life his Master's call: Worship jiva as Shiva. He was one of the pillars of the Ramakrishna Movement's service activities. His experience as a wandering monk, like those of Vivekananda, moved him to take steps to remove the distress and misery of the masses. Vivekananda's encouraging letter from America which was sent as a reply to Akhandananda's request for guidance pushed him further, and in 1894 Akhandananda began his campaign against poverty. The idea of working for the poor was conceived while he stayed in Jamnagar with Jhandu Bhatt, the famous ayurvedic physician, who served his patients with exceptional devotion. While in Khetri, Rajasthan during 1894, he went about from door to door, all alone to bring awareness in the people about the utility of education, and it was because of his efforts that the number of students in the Khetri Rajya English School rose from 80 to 257. Under his inspiration, the Maharaja of Khetri Ajit Singh arranged for the education of the Golas and also set up a permanent Education Department to open schools in the villages. Akhandananda also arranged for the publication of a newspaper on agriculture in order to educate the farmers of that area. He also contacted renowned landlords in the numerous village of Khetri, inspiring them to take some concrete steps towards removing the miseries of their poor labourers. At the instance of the Swami the Sanskrit school in Khetri was converted to Vedic school, and he raised subscriptions to purchase books for the poor students. He fed the Bhils, an aboriginal tribe, in Uadaipur. He left Rajputana in 1895 and returned to the Alambazar Math, the new monastery of the Ramakrishna disciples. He first came in contact with widespread famine during his travel in the Murshidabad district of Bengal. He sought help from his brother disciples in 1897 and Vivekananda, who had returned to India by then, sent two monks with money. On 1 May 1897 Vivekananda inaugurated the Ramakrishna Mission, and Akhandananda opened a relief centre on 15 May in the temple premises of Mrityunjay Bhattacharya of Kedar-Mahula in Murshidabad to save people from an all-devouring famine. Though rice was difficult to procure at that time, he managed to procure some with the help of other people and with much trouble. Then he distributed equally among the poor, weighing the rice himself on a scale. This was the first public service work done by the Ramakrishna Mission.

Akhandananda started an orphanage in Mahula, near Berhampore, on 31 August 1897, and then established the first Rural Branch Centre of the Ramakrishna Math and Ramakrishna Mission in Mahula. In 1899, he opened an ashrama in Shivnagar near Sargachi which continued for 14 years. In 1899, he opened a free school there to deal with the problem of illiteracy in the locality. A carpentry and a weaving section also were added to revive those perishing village industries and make the boys self-reliant. Cotton cultivation was taught to the rural women to enhance their family income. In 1913 the present ashrama was found on a 13 acres land in March 1913. He also led in relief activities in the Bhagalpur district of Bihar and during the Munger earthquake in Bihar.

== Literary works ==
- In the Lap of the Himalayas
- From holy wanderings to the service of God in man
- The call of the Spirit: Conversations With Swami Akhandananda, Swami Nirmayananda

== Honors ==
There is a dormitory named, in his honour, Akhandananda Dham in Ramakrishna Mission Vidyapith, Deoghar.

Also a boys' hostel in the Ramakrishna Mission Vidyalaya, Narendrapur - has been named after him. It is called the 'Akhandananda Bhavana'.
