= Bodhamayananda =

Indian philosopher

Swami Bodhamayananda

Personal life
- Born: Karnataka

Religious life
- Religion: Hinduism
- Philosophy: Vedanta

Religious career
- Influenced: Swami Vivekananda

Bodhamayananda or Swami Bodhamayananda is a monk in the Ramakrishna Mission. He is the Adhyaksha of Ramakrishna math Hyderabad, director of Vivekananda Institute of Human Excellence, Hyderabad, and the Coordinator of the Personality Development Project of Sri Ramakrishna Math, Chennai.

== Activities ==
=== Youth-work ===
Bodhamayananda is an adherent of Swami Vivekananda's teachings. He encourages students to develop self-confidence and build a strong character by reading the books of Swami Vivekananda. He has organized youth conventions and meditation classes also.

=== Societal development ===
Bodhamayananda has given motivational and stress management lectures at different institutions. In his motivational speeches he speaks of three "H's": "Head to Think, Heart to Feel, and Hands to Work for the development of the society." According to him, human and spiritual values need to be given more importance in the education system.

=== Management ===
Swami Bodhamayananda moderated the one-day workshop on Corporate Excellence through Spiritual Culture organized in Sri Ramakrishna Math, Chennai in March 2009.

In National Aerospace Laboratories's Vigilance Awareness Week of 2009 Bodhamayananda gave a lecture on Spirituality in Management where he said management is needed in every sphere of life. According to him, spirituality is finding popularity with management courses because it helps employees in their search for a purpose in their personal and professional life and also because it is a novel way to motivate them into finding creative approach to problem-solving.

He also delivered a lecture on 28 January 2013 in Nitte University on "Stress management". He was a keynote speaker at a symposium on "Role of Professional Students in making India the Global Work Force" in Jawaharlal Nehru Technological University, Hyderabad.

== View on Vedanta ==
Bodhamayananda says

"The youth are attracted [to vedanta] because vedanta is a philosophy of strength and fearlessness and not a dogma rousing fear for god in the human mind."

According to him, Bhagavad Gita is "a book of practical vedanta."

== Works or publications ==
- Swami Bodhamayananda (18 July 2014). Mind and Modern Problems (Softcover). Vivekananda Institute of Human Excellence, Ramakrishna Math.

== See also ==
- Swami Vivekananda
- Bibliography of Swami Vivekananda
