= Sri Ramakrishna, the Great Master =

1952 English translation of a Bengali biography

- First edition
- Author: Sri Ramakrishna
- Translator: Swami Jagananda
- Language: Bengali
- English publication date: 1952

Sri Ramakrishna the Great Master, translated by Swami Jagadananda (a disciple of Sarada Devi), is an English translation of the Bengali biography Sri Ramakrishna Leela Prasanga, of Sri Ramakrishna, the 19th-century Indian saint and mystic. Its Bengali original was written by Swami Saradananda, which is based on interviews of persons who knew or interacted with him. It is therefore a first-hand source. The original Bengali version published was composed in five volumes and was the first full-scale biography of the saint. This is an eyewitness account and therefore carries more credibility than later books on Sri Ramakrishna. The English translation was first published in 1952. The original Bengali book was written from 1909 to 1919, over a period of ten years, in order to repay the debt incurred for constructing Udbodhan House for Holy Mother Sri Sarada Devi.

== History ==
Saradananda was one of the direct monastic disciples of Sri Ramakrishna and was the first Secretary of the Ramakrishna Math and Ramakrishna Mission. He first met Ramakrishna when he was in his teens and started writing the book almost two decades after the death of Ramakrishna in 1886. Besides Gospel of Ramakrishna, it is considered a major biographical source. However, this biography and later biographies by his disciples have been "heavily influenced by the later systematic reinterpretation" of the tradition, and should therefore be used "with critical caution" and "checked against the recorded sayings".

The original Bengali book was translated to English by Swami Jagadananda in 1952 and published by Sri Ramakrishna Math Chennai. This is the original and most complete biography of Sri Ramakrishna. More recently, another English translation has been brought out by Swami Chetanananda, named Sri Ramakrishna and His Divine Play.

== Overview ==
The book is made up of two parts. Part 1 of the book deals with the early life of Sri Ramakrishna, including his birth and childhood and his spiritual practices, while part 2 deals with Sri Ramakrishna as a spiritual teacher, his relationship with Narendranath Dutta, later Swami Vivekananda, and the later stages of his life.

== External ==
- "Sri Ramakrishna The Great Master" (PDF).
