= Advaitananda =

One of the direct disciples of Ramakrishna

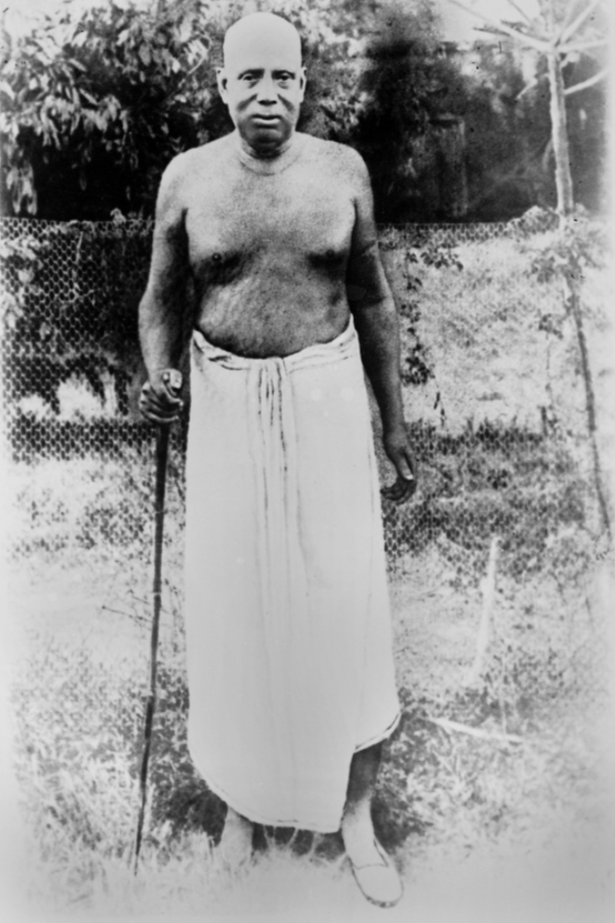

Personal life
- Born: Gopal Chandra Ghosh; 1828 Calcutta, Bengal Presidency, British India
- Died: 1909 (aged 80–81) Calcutta, Bengal Presidency, British India

Religious life
- Religion: Hinduism
- Philosophy: Vedanta

Religious career
- Teacher: Ramakrishna Paramahansa

Advaitananda (28 August 1828 – 28 December 1909) one of the direct disciples of Ramakrishna, a Hindu saint from Bengal in the late nineteenth century, was also known as Buro Gopal or the aged Gopal. He was older than Ramakrishna, and took monastic vows at an advanced age. He played a crucial role during the early years of Ramakrishna Mission.

== Biography ==
=== Pre monastic days ===
Gopal Chandra Ghosh was born on 28 August 1828 in Rajpur (Jagaddal) village in 24 paraganas, a few miles from Calcutta, to Govardhan Sur (Ghosh). He lived in Sinthi in Calcutta. Little is known about his early life and education. He was an employee in a shop in Chinabazar, which belonged to Beni Madhav Pal, a member of the Brahmo Samaj, whose name appears in The Gospel of Sri Ramakrishna. Gopal was married and at the time of meeting Ramakrishna for the first time he was more than 50 years old. At the death of his wife, he was taken by a friend to Ramakrishna to assuage his grief. On his first visit Gopal was not very impressed with Ramakrishna, but after a few more visits he became devoted to him, and served him in various ways, by buying provisions and running errands. Gopal distributed the twelve ochre clothes in the presence of Ramakrishna to the first bunch of monks of Ramakrishna order, which included Vivekananda. After death of Ramakrishna, the "Baranagar Math" was started with Gopal as the first inmate. He was soon joined by Narendra Nath Dutta (later Vivekananda), Rakhal (later Brahmananda), Kali (later Abhedananda), Latu (later Adbhutananda) and other direct disciples of Ramakrishna.

=== Monastic life ===
In 1887 Gopal along with other disciples took up the monastic life and came to be known as Advaitananda (Advaita - Non-dualism, ananda - bliss). After staying for a few years in Baranagar Math, Advaitananda travelled to Benaras where he stayed for around 5 years. Here he stayed in a small room, where he rose at 4 AM every day and bathed in the Ganga river, after which he did his spiritual practices for the day. He lived on madhukari i.e. begging small quantities of cooked food from various places, as per the injunctions of the scriptures. He spent time mostly in contemplation.

When Vivekananda returned to India after his visit to the west, Advaitananda returned to Alambazar, where the Ramakrishna Math had moved to. Afterwards, when the new monastery in Belur Math was established, he used to stay mostly there and looked after gardening and other managerial affairs. Even in his old age he was self-sufficient. After his return to the monastery, Advaitananda's special duty was to look to the levelling of the newly purchased land at Belur and the repair of the old structures there. The land had been in use for repair of steamers etc. and was hence full of pits and canals. All this meant strenuous work. When the monastery became fully established there, he took up the duty of looking after the comforts of the monks and producing food. He sometimes expressed disappointment that he fell so short of the ideal. He was very old and did not take up any public activity; his monastic life was quite simple. However, he lived austerely and practiced meditation till his last days. He travelled extensively and visited at one time or other sacred places including Kedarnath, Badrinarayan, and Hardwar in the north, Dwaraka in the west, and Rameswaram and other places in the south. He was in sound health throughout his life, even at an advanced age. He accompanied Sarada Devi in some of her travels. After suffering for some time from stomach trouble, he died on 28 December 1909, at the age of 81.
