= Ramakrishnananda =

Indian missionary (1865–1911)

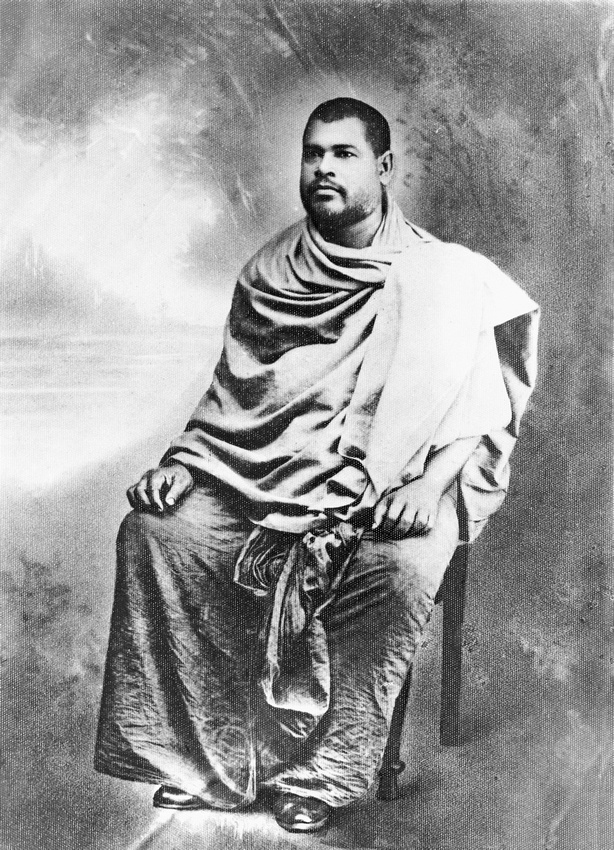
- Ramakrishnananda

Personal life
- Born: Shashi Bhushan Chakravarty; 13 July 1863 Ichapur, Hooghly district, Bengal Presidency
- Died: 21 August 1911 (aged 48) Calcutta, India

Religious life
- Religion: Hinduism
- Philosophy: Advaita Vedanta

Religious career
- Teacher: Ramakrishna Paramahamsa

Quotation

Science is the struggle of man in the outside world. Religion is the struggle of man in the inner world. Religion begins where science ends.

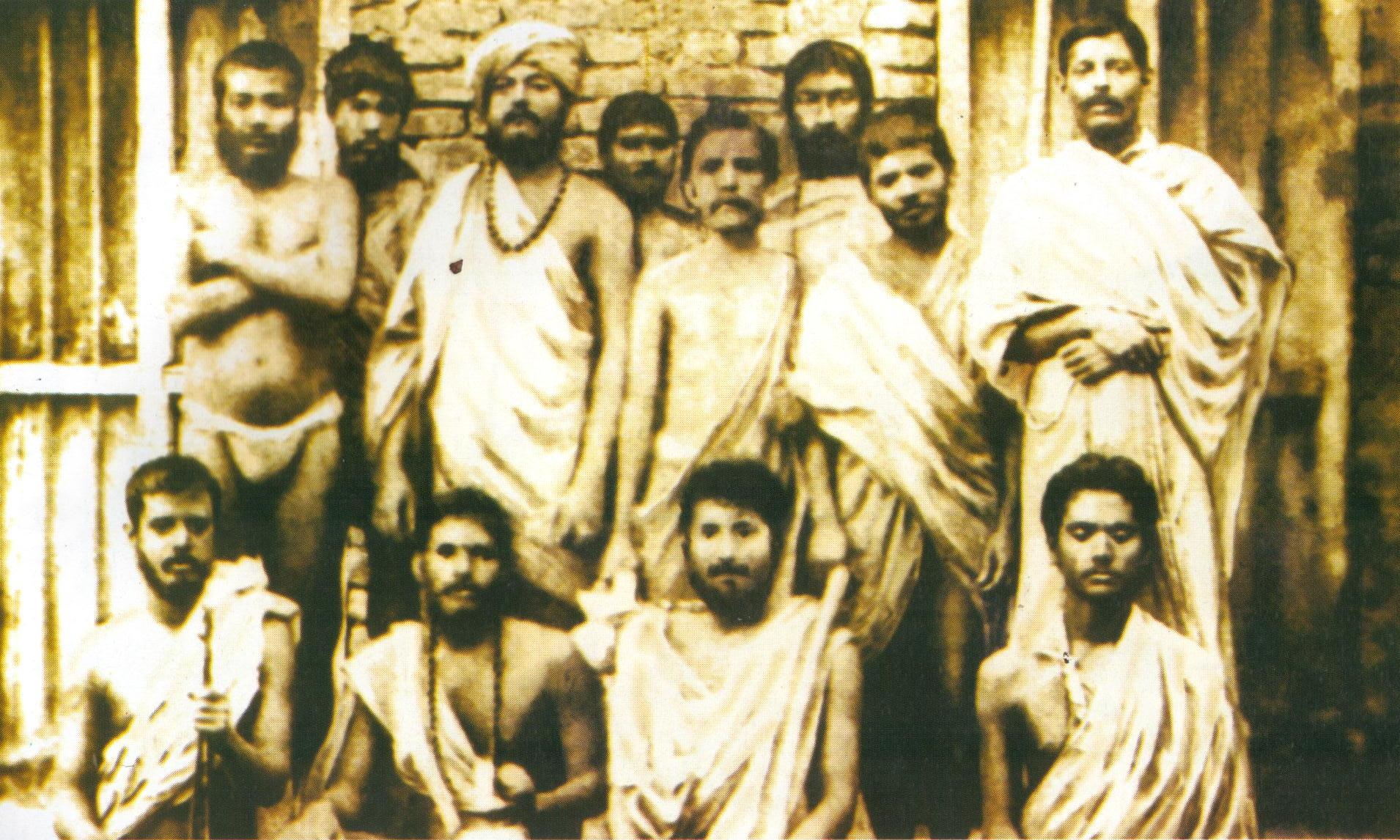
Group photo taken on 30 January 1887 in Baranagar Math, Kolkata. Standing: (l–r) ) Shivananda, Ramakrishnananda, Vivekananda, Randhuni, Debendranath Majumdar, Mahendranath Gupta (Shri M), Trigunatitananda, H.Mustafi Sitting: (l–r) Niranjanananda, Saradananda, Hutko Gopal, Abhedananda

Ramakrishnananda (13 July 1863 – 21 August 1911) was one of the direct disciples of Ramakrishna. Known for his "Gurubhakti" [Service to the Guru], he served the Baranagore Math for 12 years without missing a single day.

== Biography ==
Ramakrishnananda was born as Shashi Bhushan Chakravarty on 13 July 1863. His father Ishwara Chandra Chakravarty was an expert in ritualistic worship, and Shashi imbibed from him love for ritualistic worship. After passing out of the village school, he went to Kolkata and lived with his cousin Sharat (later, Swami Saradananda) for higher education. A brilliant student, he chose mathematics for the B.A. course, which, however, he could not complete owing to the terminal illness of Ramakrishna at Cossipore.

While studying in a Calcutta college, Shashi and Sharat joined the Brahmo Samaj, and heard about Ramakrishna from Keshab Chandra Sen himself. In October 1883 they visited Dakshineswar and were deeply attracted to Ramakrishna, who used to say that Shashi and Sharat had been the followers of Jesus Christ in their previous birth.

Shashi distinguished himself most by the self-sacrificing spirit and devotion with which he served Ramakrishna during his last illness at Shyampukur and Cossipore. After the Master's passing he joined the Baranagar Math and underwent sannyasa ordination, assuming the name Ramakrishnananda. He took charge of the worship of the Atmaramer kauta, the urn containing the relics of Ramakrishna in the Math's shrine. He felt the living presence of the Master, and so his worship was not a mere ritual but loving service to a living God. It was Swami Ramakrishnananda who formulated and introduced the system of daily ritualistic worship to Ramakrishna that is followed in the Ramakrishna Movement.

He seldom went out on pilgrimage, and devoted himself to daily worship at the Math. But when Vivekananda, after his return from the West, asked him to go to Madras (presently called Chennai) and open a branch centre of Ramakrishna Math there, he obeyed without any hesitation. The saga of sacrifice and hardship that he underwent in preaching the message of Ramakrishna and Vivekananda for 14 years under unfavourable conditions has been recorded in letters of gold in the annals of the Ramakrishna Movement. In the South he travelled extensively. The starting of centres in Trivandrum, Mysore, Bangalore and Mumbai owed much to his pioneering efforts. His last and the greatest accomplishment was to arrange for the visit of Sarada Devi to South India in 1911 which event gave great impetus to the growth of Ramakrishna Movement all over India and South India in particular. He introduced his colleague Swami Nirmalananda to friends of Ramakrishna Mission in South India, especially those in Bangalore and Kerala, which led to Nirmalananda taking up the mantle and continuing till 1938 in expanding the works started by Ramakrishnananda.

Incessant work, especially his service to Sarada Devi during her travels in the South, told upon his health, and he contracted tuberculosis. He spent some weeks in Bangalore with a hope of getting better in the salubrious climate there under the care of his brother disciple Nirmalananda. But since the deterioration continued he was sent to Calcutta (presently called Kolkata) He died in a state of ecstasy on 21 August 1911.

=== Teachings ===
Swami Ramakrishnananda, known for his deep asceticism and devotion, often emphasized the importance of purity, self-discipline, and childlike surrender in the spiritual path. The following statements, drawn from his teachings and recorded discourses, illustrate core aspects of his spiritual philosophy:

- “The child’s devotion to the mother is the best model for devotion to God.”
- “A characterless man is a slave to worldly enjoyment.”
- “If you would raise yourself, you must crucify the body and conquer the senses.”
- “You have been worshipping the god of your body for so many lives.”

== Legacy ==
- He introduced ritualistic worship of Ramakrishna and formulated Brahmacharya vows for novices of the Ramakrishna Order
- He started Sri Ramakrishna Math Chennai, Sri Ramakrishna Math Bangalore, Ramakrishna Mission Students Home in Mylapore, National School for Girls, George Town, Chennai, Publication of books on Ramakrishna – Vivekananda from Madras.
- Extensive travels to Bangalore, Mysore, Trivandrum, Allepey, Ernakulam, Machilipatnam, Tirunelveli, Rangoon, Bombay and other places. As a result of his visits, many centres of Ramakrishna Math and Ramakrishna Mission came up in some of the places later
- His writings and lectures include Life of Sri Ramanuja, God and Divine Incarnation, The Message of Eternal Wisdom, Sri Krishna: Pastoral and the King Maker, For Thinkers on Education, The Ancient Quest, Consolations, The Soul of Man, The Universe and Man, Path to Perfection, Sri Ramkakrishna and His Mission
- For the relief work of 1897 famine in Bengal, he collected substantial amount. This was helpful to Akhandananda who was directly involved in the ground work of that relief.

== Testimonials ==
According to the Ramakrishna Math, Vivekananda had once said, "I shall send you one who is more orthodox than the most orthodox Brahmins of the South and who is at the same time incomparable in performing worship, scriptural knowledge and meditation on God." They say that he was referring to Ramakrishnananda, who was sent in March 1897.

Ramakrishnanda was said to be a student of all of the great scriptures. He knew the Bible and expounded it. A disciple wrote

He knew the Bible from cover to cover and expounded it in a spirit and with an understanding which are rare even in Christian countries…My whole being was stirred by the living reality of his words and as we drove home, I asked how he could make them so real and living. He sat silent for a moment, then he said quietly and simply: "My Master used to tell me that in a previous life Saradananda and I were Christ's disciples."

— Laura Glenn (Also known as Sister Devamata).

== Quotes ==
1. It is apparently absurd, but really true, when i say God is nearer to you than you are to yourself. Where are you at present? where your mind is there you must be. And where your mind is? Scattered all over the world and attached to it so firmly that you deem it almost impossible to bring it back inside yourself. And where God is? He is always seated in your Heart. So God is always within you, and you are always outside yourself, or in other words "God is nearer to you than you are to yourself".
2. Actually very few of us believe in God all the time. How do we know this ? Because we allow anxieties and fears to arise in our minds.
3. The more, you will be able to minimise your attachment to your sensual enjoyments, the more it will be possible to concentrate your mind. As it is impossible to fill up a jar with water, even if you keep it under a water pipe for hours and hours together, so it is impossible to control your mind if you allow it to escape every now and then through the openings of your senses. If you allow your mind to drink unduly of the liquor of sensual enjoyments, how can you ever expect to make it calm and sober?
4. Do your Duty; never grow anxious and do not think of the future. Whenever anxiety arises in you, you become an atheist; you do not believe in God and that he cares for you. If you have real faith, you can never never grow anxious.
5. Steadiness in devotion means that though you may be busy with many things, still your mind is always turned towards God. It should be like the needle of the compass; the needle may swing a little to this side or that, but always has tendency to point back to north.
6. To see God everywhere is the Highest worship; meditation is the next best; prayer and repetition of divine names are lower than that; external worship is the lowest. Ordinary people perform worship to escape from the displeasure of God or in expectation of fulfilling some desires.All these are low motives. Real worship is not done until devotion overflows the heart and tears roll down from the eyes for a glimpse of God. A true devotee takes God's name with every breath, is filled with sincere devotion and offers flowers, leaves and water to God without any selfish motive, saying 'O Mother Divine, worship and prayer are nothing but opportune moment to call on You'.
7. Science is the struggle of man in the outside world. Religion is the struggle of man in the inner world. Religion begins where science ends.
