= Trigunatitananda =

Indian missionary (1865–1915)

Swami Trigunatitananda
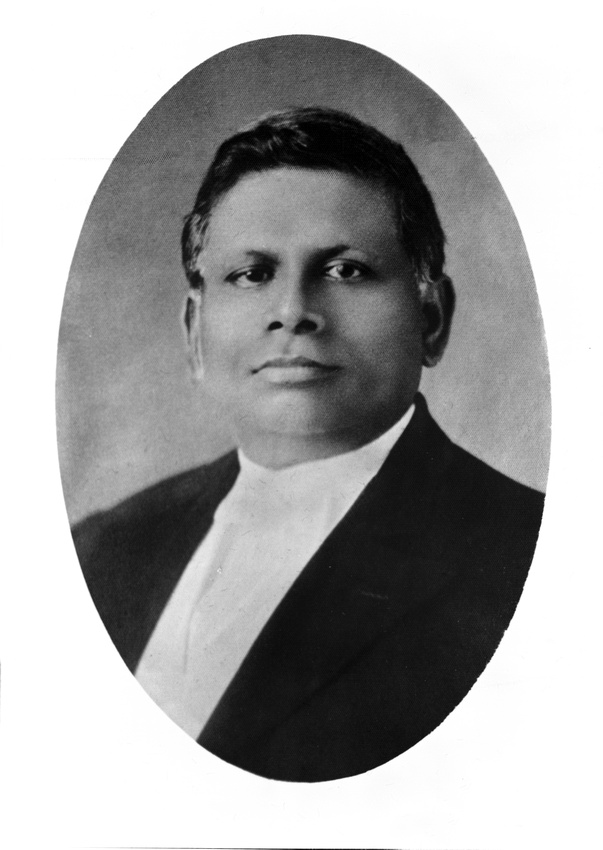

Personal life
- Born: Sarada Prasanna Mitra; 30 January 1865 24 Parganas, Bengal, British India (now West Bengal, India)
- Died: 10 January 1915 (aged 49) San Francisco, California, United States

Religious life
- Religion: Hinduism
- Philosophy: Advaita Vedanta

Religious career
- Teacher: Ramakrishna Paramahansa

Quotation

"Work hard. Discipline yourself. Build your character. Endure to the end. Realize your Self. And be free."

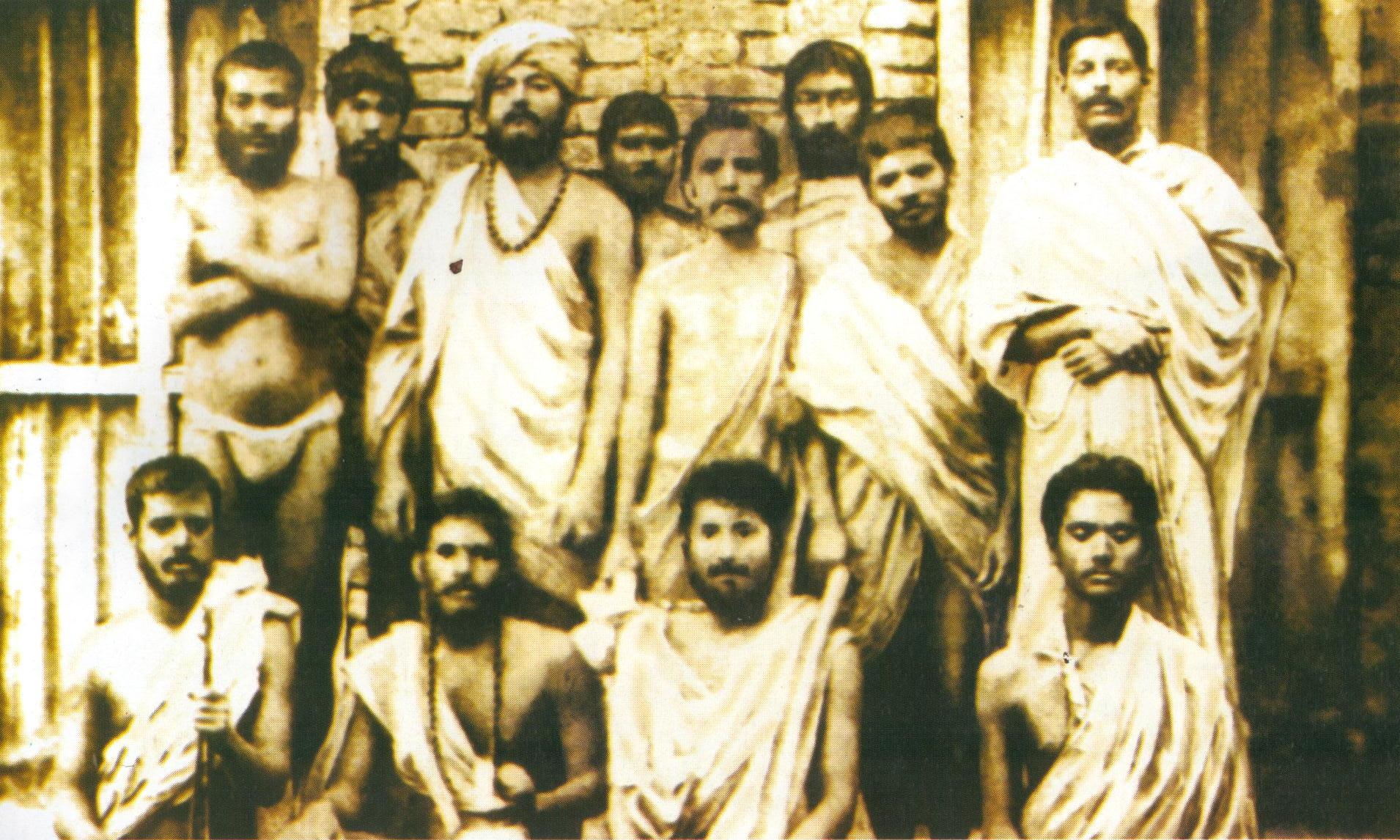
Group photo taken on 30 January 1887 In Baranagar Math, Kolkata. Standing: (l–r) Shivananda, Ramakrishnananda, Vivekananda, Randhuni, Debendranath Majumdar, Mahendranath Gupta (Shri M), Trigunatitananda, H.Mustafi Sitting: (l–r) Niranjanananda, Saradananda, Hutko Gopal, Abhedananda

Trigunatitananda (30 January 1865 – 10 January 1915), premonastic name Sarada Prasanna Mitra, was a direct disciple of Ramakrishna, the 19th-century Indian Hindu mystic and sant. He established the monthly Bengali magazine Udbodhan of Ramakrishna Math and later, at the behest of Vivekananda, went to America in 1902 and took charge of the San Francisco centre.

== Life ==
Trigunatitananda was born as Sarada Prasanna Mitra, on 30 January 1865. He was born to an aristocratic family in the village of Naora in Bhangar I, (now in South 24 Parganas) near Calcutta. Sarada was enrolled in the Metropolitan Institution at Shyampukur, Calcutta. This was a school of Iswar Chandra Vidyasagar, a social reformer, educator and scholar of 19th century India. The headmaster there was Mahendranath Gupta, better known as "M", the author of The Gospel of Sri Ramakrishna (or Sri Ramakrishna Kathamrita in Bengali). Sarada did not do well in the school-leaving "entrance examination". "M" took young Sarada to Dakshineswar temple to meet Ramakrishna on 27 December 1884.

At a very young age Sarada had shown a religious disposition and this was reinforced by contact with Ramakrishna, whom he visited often after joining the Metropolitan college.

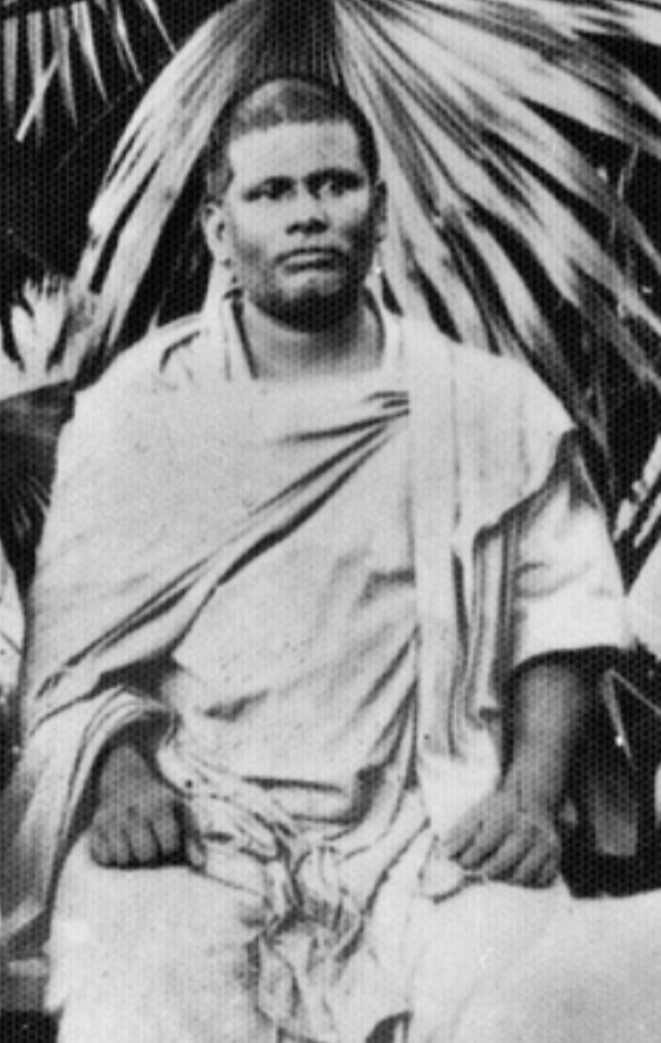
Sarada prasanna maharaj urf Swami Trigunitananda

When his parents decided to arrange a marriage for him according to Indian customs, he left his house for Puri in January 1886, but was brought back by his parents. He appeared for and passed his First Arts examination. He dedicated himself to the service of Ramakrishna when the latter was terminally ill in Cossipore Garden House. After Ramakrishna died, Sarada began to stay with Narendranath Dutta (later Vivekananda) and a group of dedicated direct disciples of Ramakrishna, who renounced worldly life, in "Baranagar Math".

=== Monastic life ===
In January 1887 Sarada took the vows of complete renunciation or sannyas along with his brother disciples, and came to be known as Trigunatitananda (one who has surpassed the three gunas or attributes and have attained supreme bliss, an enlightened one. Triguna: the three gunas or attributes of Sattva (contemplation), Rajas (activity) and Tamas (darkness or passivity)). In 1891 Trigunatita started on pilgrimage for Vrindaban, Mathura, Jaipur, Ajmere, Kathiawar. At Porbandar, he met Vivekananda. After that, he returned to Baranagar Math. In 1895, he set out on foot for Mount Kailash and Lake Manasarovar. He came back to Calcutta and stayed in the house of a devotee and led a contemplative life for some time. After some time he went to stay in the newly formed Alambazar Math of the Ramakrishna order. He was influenced by Vivekananda's ideal of service and philanthropic activities. In 1897 when the district of Dinajpur in Bengal was in the grip of a famine, he went there and organised relief work. Vivekananda had planned a magazine to spread the message of Vedanta. For this purpose a press was bought and Trigunatita was put in charge of publishing the magazine, Udbodhan. After Yogananda's death, Trigunatitananda became a personal attendant to Sarada Devi for a time. His brother Ashutosh Mitra, later a monk of the Ramakrishna Order, also served her for a time.

=== Work in America ===
In 1902 when Turiyananda returned from America prematurely due to ill health, Trigunatitananda was sent to replace him. On 2 January 1903, he reached San Francisco and was taken to the house of T.H. Logan, president of the San Francisco Vedanta society. A few weeks later he went to the home of Mr. and Mrs C.F. Petersen where he was to make his headquarters. Classes and lectures were held regularly. Before long the flat became too small for the Society's operations, and they moved to another flat at 40 Steiner Street. In 1904, because of the work involved, Trigunatitananda felt that a new building for Vedanta Society of San Francisco was needed. Funds were raised, and in January 1906 the building in Webster Street, which came to be known as the first Hindu Temple in the western world, was established and opened to the public. The Swami published a pamphlet explaining each tower and detail of the structure. "This temple," the pamphlet began, "may be considered as a combination of a Hindu temple, a Christian church, a Mohammedan mosque, a Hindu math or monastery, and an American residence." Then it goes on to explain the symbolism built into the temple.

About this temple Trigunatitananda had said, Believe me, believe me, if there is least tinge of selfishness in building this temple, it will fall, but if it is the Master's work, it will stand. It survived unscathed the major 1906 San Francisco earthquake. Soon after this a monastery was set up with about ten monks, and a convent. In 1909 the Swami started a monthly magazine called the Voice of Freedom, which was produced for seven years, based on the ideals of Vedanta.

Every year the Swami led a selected group of students to Shanti Ashrama, in the San Antone valley in California, a spiritual retreat which was established by Turiyananda, his predecessor and a brother disciple. The inmates spent their time in meditation and prayer.

Trigunatitananda opposed any attempt for his students to get involved in the Indian independence movement. He once said that "his society would never be mixed up with any matter affecting the British Rule in India" and actively encouraged student activists in favor of Indian independence to "give up politics." In a 1911 letter, Hopkinson wrote, "Regarding Swami Trigunatiti [sic] of the Vedanta Society, I am quite assured that we at least have one loyal East Indian … in this city."

=== Last days ===
Trigunatita suffered from chronic rheumatism and Bright's disease, but continued his work. On 27 December 1914 he was holding a Sunday service when a bomb was thrown onto the pulpit by a former student. That student died and Trigunatita was fatally injured. On his way to the hospital, he was only concerned about the student. A nurse who attended on him commented: "I have never seen such a calm, uncomplaining, and enduring patient in my life." He died on 10 January 1915. In 1916 his relics were installed on the top of the highest hill, Siddha Giri, the "Hill of Realization" at Shanti Ashram.

=== Character and legacy ===
==== Quotes ====
- Keep on praying to God with your whole heart; if the need arises for you to have a Guru, God will send somebody for you who will be just the man you want
- People talk of finding out the proper kind of guru. But that is not a reasonable position in all cases. Whoever the guru may be, everything will progress nicely if the disciple is earnest and sincere.
- People of all castes can be initiated by a good guru who has attained perfection. What caste can a true devotee or the perfect soul have? When the individual soul merges in God (like rivers in the sea), they can no more have any individuality. So how can there be then, the distinction of caste, as Brahmin, etc., belonging to the body and never to the soul?
