= Saradananda =

Indian Monastic yogi (1865–1927)

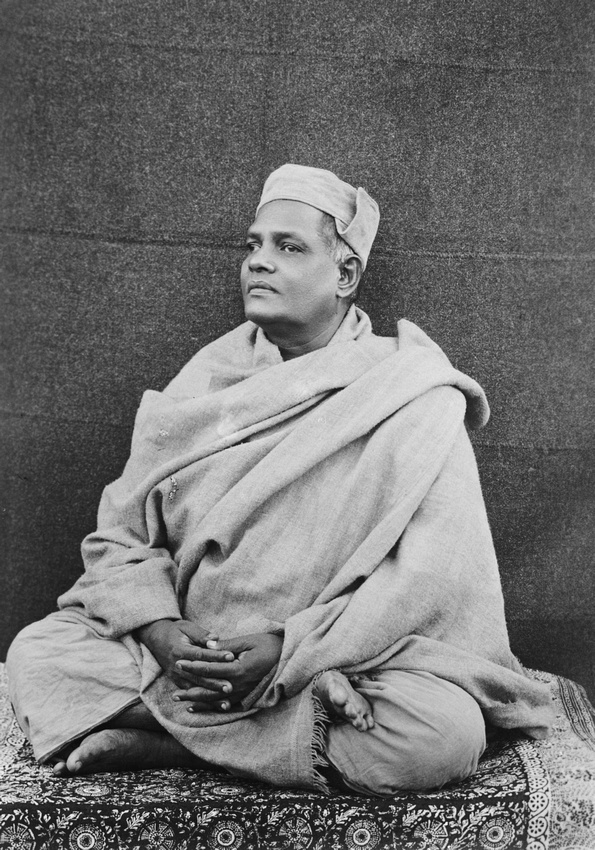
- Swami Saradananda

Personal life
- Born: Sarat Chandra Chakraborty; 23 December 1865 Calcutta, Bengal, British India (now West Bengal, India)
- Died: 19 August 1927 (aged 61) Calcutta, Bengal, British India (now West Bengal, India)

Religious life
- Religion: Hinduism
- Philosophy: Advaita Vedanta

Religious career
- Teacher: Ramakrishna Paramahansa
- Disciples: Bhuteshananda and others.

Quotation

Through selfless work the mind gets purified. And when the mind becomes pure, there arise knowledge and devotion in it.

Saradananda (23 December 1865 – 19 August 1927), also known as Swami Saradananda, was born as Sarat Chandra Chakravarty in 1865, and was one of the direct monastic disciples of Ramakrishna. He was the first Secretary of the Ramakrishna Math and Ramakrishna Mission, a post which he held until his death in 1927. He established the Udbodhan house in the Bagbazar area of Calcutta, which was built primarily for the stay of Sri Sarada Devi in Calcutta, from where he used to publish the Bengali magazine Udbodhan. There he wrote Sri Sri Ramakrishna Lilaprasanga in Bengali, on the life of Ramakrishna, which was translated into English as Sri Ramakrishna, the Great Master. He is believed to be reincarnation of Saint Peter (Direct apostle of Jesus Christ) and he allegedly went into Samadhi when he was in the Saint Peter Church and said that "I remembered my past" and wrote in his diary that "Saint Peter again."

== Biography ==
=== Early years ===
Sarat Chandra Chakravarti (b. 23 December 1865) was born in Amherst Street, Calcutta to a rich and orthodox Brahmin family. His cousin was Shashi, later known as Ramakrishnananda. His grandfather was a Sanskrit scholar with a religious disposition. Sarat Chandra's father was the co-owner of a pharmacy and was very rich.

After his initiation according to the customs of the Hindu Brahmin caste, he worshipped regularly in the family shrine. He sometimes would give away his personal belongings to the poor and needy. Sarat Chandra helped the ill, even if they had contagious diseases. He nursed a poor maid servant who was left to die by her master as she suffered from cholera, and also performed her last rites when she died.

As he grew up, he came under the influence of Brahmo leader Keshab Chandra Sen. He began to be actively associated with the Brahmo Samaj. In 1882, he passed the school-leaving examination and was admitted to St. Xaviers College.

=== Influence of Ramakrishna ===
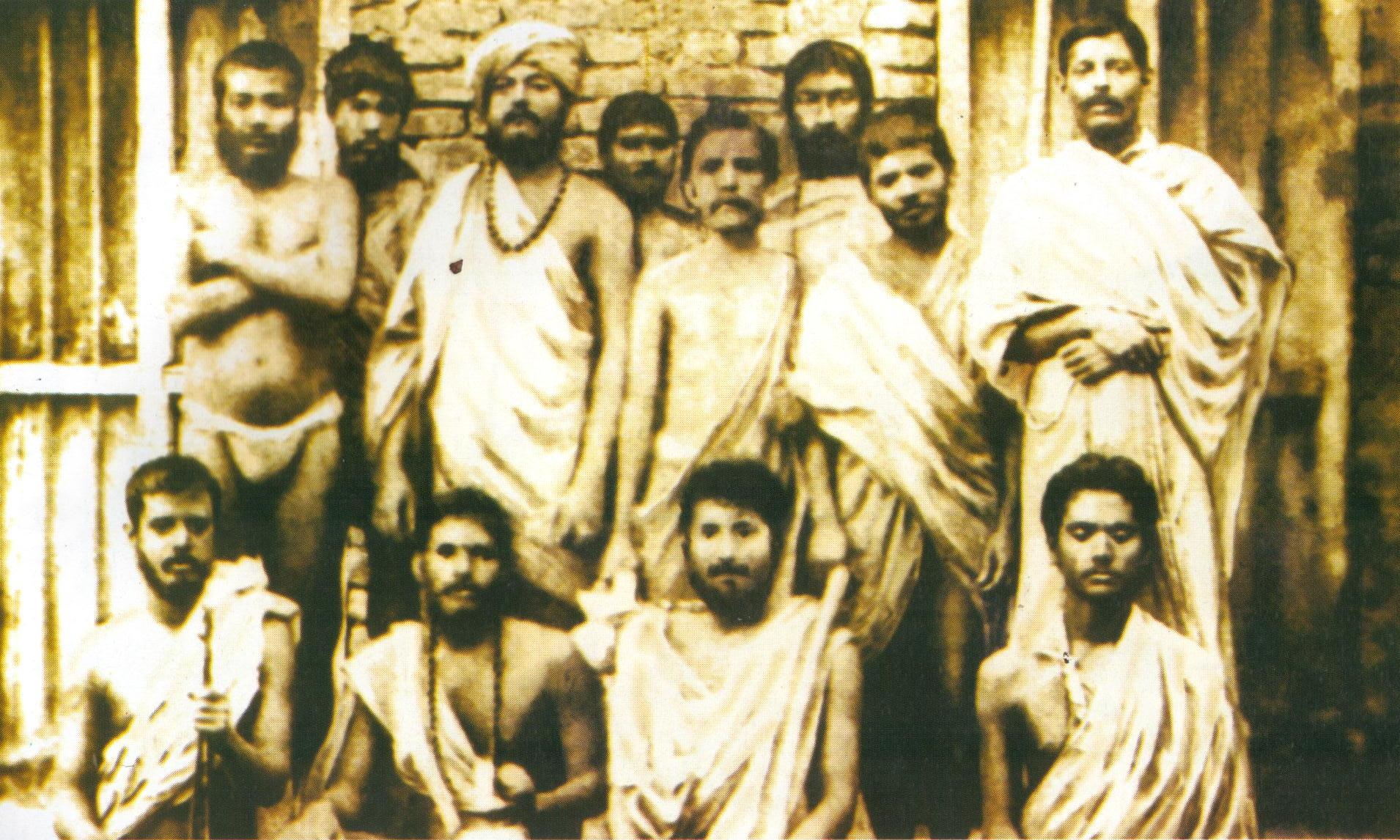
Group photo taken on 30 January 1887 In Baranagar Math, Kolkata.

Standing: (l–r) Shivananda, Ramakrishnananda, Vivekananda, Randhuni, Debendranath Majumdar, Mahendranath Gupta (Shri M), Trigunatitananda, H.Mustafi
Sitting: (l–r) Niranjanananda, Saradananda, Hutko Gopal, Abhedananda.

In October 1883 Sarat and Shashi went to Dakshineswar to meet Ramakrishna, who was speaking to a general audience on the subject of marriage and renunciation. Sarat visited Dakshineswar temple to meet Ramakrishna every Thursday and as he got more closely acquainted with him, he began to get directions on spiritual practices. On one occasion, the master had asked him, "How would you like to realize God?". The disciple replied, "I would not like to see any particular form of God in meditation. I want to see him manifested in all creatures of the world."

Sarat passed the First Arts examination in 1885. His father wanted him to study medicine. However, he gave it up and devoted his time in nursing Ramakrishna, first in Shyampukur and then in Cossipore garden house, when the latter was critically ill. After the death of Ramakrishna, Sarat at first came back to his house but then joined the Baranagar Math along with his other brother disciples, accompanied by his cousin Shashi.

=== Relationship with Vivekananda ===
Sarat had met Narendranath Dutta, who later became famous as Swami Vivekananda, and found him conceited, even before he came to Ramakrishna, in one of his friend's house. When Ramakrishna praised a certain Narendranath, Sarat expressed the desire of meeting him, and was surprised to identify him as his earlier conceited acquaintance. Their relationship soon matured into a very close friendship which lasted until death.

On Narendranath's recommendation, Sarat joined Calcutta Medical College to study medicine. He gave it up on hearing about Ramakrishna's illness and joined Narendra and a group of young devotees to nurse him.

When he started the Ramakrishna Mission, Vivekananda made Sarat or Saradananda, its first secretary. After the death of Swami Brahmananda, the first president of Ramakrishna Math and Mission, when it was proposed to make Saradananda the next president he declined on the ground that he had been made secretary by Vivekananda and would continue in that post.

=== Life of a wandering ascetic ===
In Baranagar Math, the young monastic disciples had to go through a strenuous life of ascetism and penance, sometimes going without food and other necessities of life. Sarat Chandra would often go to meditate in Dakshineswar, sometimes, alone, at other times with Narendranath. Sarat would volunteer for jobs which needed strong labour, like sweeping, cleaning and washing, as well as nursing any indisposed brother disciple. Saradananda was a strict vegetarian.

After the young disciples took formal Sannyas or renunciation, Sarat was given the name "Saradananda". He travelled to Puri and then to Northern India, including Benares, Ayodhya and Rishikesh. He also travelled to Gangotri, Kedarnath and Badrinath, the three sacred places of pilgrimage on the Himalayas. In the course of this pilgrimage he had to sometimes go without food and even without shelter, often finding himself in perilous situation.

After visiting Kedarnath, Tunganath and Badrinath, in 1890 Saradananda came to Almora and took up residence in the house of a devotee, Lala Badrinath Shah. He met Vivekananda there, and together they started for Garhwal. From there he came to Rajpur near Mussouri and met Turiyananda, another brother disciple with whom he had gone to Kedarnath. He then went to Rishikesh and there at Kankhal met Swami Brahmananda, or Rakhal Maharaj, another brother disciple. After that, he first went to Meerut to meet Vivekananda and then to Delhi along with him, where the later separated from his brother disciples. Only after six years, Saradananda met Vivekananda again; on his bidding, Saradananda went to London to preach Vedanta.

From Delhi, he went to Benaras and stayed there for some time, met Swami Abhedananda, another brother disciple, and also initiated a young monk, who was later named as Swami Sacchidananda. He fell ill with blood dysentery in Benares and came back to the Baranagar monastery in 1891. Subsequently, after recovering he traveled to Jayrambati, the birthplace of Sri Sarada Devi, where she was staying. Later he came back to Calcutta and the monastery of Ramakrishna shifted to Alambazar, a place near Dakshineswar in 1892.

In 1893 the news reached the brothers of the success of Vivekananda in the Parliament of the World's Religions, in Chicago. Vivekananda then called for the participation of his brother disciples in his mission of preaching Vedanta to the West and raising money for welfare activities in India. Saradananda responded to his call and traveled for London in 1896.

=== Preaching Vedanta in the West ===
Saradananda delivered a few lectures in London but was soon sent to New York where the Vedanta Society was established. He was invited to be a teacher at the Greenacre Conference of Comparative Religions where he began his work with a lecture on the Vedanta and classes on Yoga. Towards the end of the conference he was invited to speak in Brooklyn, New York and Boston. At Brooklyn Ethical Association he lectured on ethical ideals of Hindus. He settled in New York to carry out the Vedanta movement in an organised way. He sailed back for India on 12 January 1898 and visited London, Paris and Rome on the way.

=== Ramakrishna Mission and his work ===
When Ramakrishna Mission was first established by Vivekananda, he made Saradananda the secretary of the Math and Mission, a post which the later held for thirty years till his death. On his return from the West, Saradananda gave a series of lectures in Albert Hall in Calcutta on Vedanta. During the early days of the organisation he came under suspicion for harbouring freedom fighters, some of whom took refuge with the organisation. Under the effective guidance of the Sarada Devi, Saradananda approached the then viceroy and presented his case. Thereafter, the Government relented.

In 1899, plague broke out in Calcutta and Ramakrishna Mission organised relief. Saradananda was involved in relief work with the help of Sister Nivedita and other brother monks of the order.

In 1899, he traveled to Gujarat along with Swami Turiyananda to collect funds for the Mission and extensively toured various parts including Ahmedabad, Junagarh, Bhavnagar etc. He gave lectures in Hindi.

After Vivekananda's second departure to West, he also started training young monks.

In December 1899 he went to Dacca, Barisal and Narayangunj on an invitation and there stayed in the house of Ashwini Kumar Dutta. He also gave many lectures.

After his return to Calcutta, he became interested in the Tantrika form of worship under the guidance of his uncle Ishwar Chandra Chakravarty. After this experience he wrote a book "Bharate Shakti Puja" or "The worship of divine mother in India".

In 1902, after Vivekananda's death, Saradananda took up the job of managing day-to-day affairs of Belur Math and also that of editing and publishing Udbodhan, a Bengali magazine started by the former. He wrote articles, arranged for funding and supervised operations. Gradually, the financial health of the magazine was restored. He constructed a house for the holy mother by taking a loan and to repay the loan started writing his magnum opus "Sri Sri Ramakrishna Lilaprasanga" or "Ramakrishna, the Great Master", a biography and life of Ramakrishna. The Udbodhan office started in the new building towards 1908.

In 1909 two co-accused in Maniktola Bomb Case, Devavrata Bose and Sachindranath Sen, came to join the Ramakrishna order, giving up their political activities. Despite opposition from the senior monks and the risk of affronting the British Government, Saradananda took full responsibility and accepted both of them into the order and met highly placed Government officials for explaining his position.

In 1913 under him, Ramakrishna Mission started relief operations when a major flood broke out in Burdwan district of Bengal, collecting funds and organizing relief work.

In 1916, he went for a pilgrimage to Gaya, Benares, Vrindaban and returned after 2 months.

After the death of Sarada Devi in 1920 and Swami Brahmananda in 1922, Saradananda gradually withdrew from active work. His primary engagement at this time was the construction of a temple for Sarada Devi in Jayrambati, and another one in Belur Math, on the place where she was cremated. The temple in Belur Math was constructed in 1921 and that in Jairambati was commissioned in April 1923.

The Ramakrishna Mission Convention at Belur Math was held in 1926, a meeting of the monks of Ramakrishna Math and Mission Centres from all over the world. Saradananda gave the welcome address, in which he put up a warning note of the dangers of complacency and exhorted the monks to stick to the ideals of the founding members. At the end of the convention, he appointed a committee to deal with the day-to-day work of the mission. After the convention, he almost retired from an active life, devoting more and more time to meditation.

=== Responsibility of Sarada Devi ===
While in the course of managing Udbodhan, He felt the need to construct a house for Sarada Devi, who had to stay in the house of lay devotees in Calcutta. He bought a house in Bagbazar area and used its downstairs for publishing and running the operation of the magazine and the upstairs as the abode of Sarada Devi and her devotees, and her shrine. At that time this was known as the "mother's house" and now it is known as the "Udbodhan house". Sarada Devi came to this house for the first time on 23 May 1909. Saradananda was very devoted to her and called himself her "doorkeeper". He not only looked after her, but also after her family: brothers and nieces as well as the devotees, including many women. He bore the financial as well as other responsibilities willingly. Sarada Devi had great trust in him as she herself said that "It is not easy to bear my burden, only Sarat can do it." If she suffered from illness while staying in Jairambati, her native place, Swami Saradananda would come down along with the doctor for her medical treatment. When she was terminally ill in Jairambati, he made arrangements to bring her to Calcutta, where she underwent treatment for five months. He also took up all responsibilities for building her temple and shrine in Jairambati after she died. He continued to take up the responsibility of her family members till his death.

=== Afflictions and death ===
Saradananda suffered from kidney trouble in 1914. He suffered from various other ailments, and after his retirement from an active life in 1926 his afflictions got more serious. On 6 August 1927, he suffered an attack, which the doctors diagnosed as apoplexy. He never recovered consciousness, and died on 19 August.

=== Character and legacy ===
==== Compassion and kindness ====
Saradananda was known for his judgement, patience and heart. He had a personality which won him many admirers and friends in India and in the West. It is said that one day Ramakrishna, in a state of ecstasy, had sat on the lap of young Sarat and told that, I was testing how much burden he could bear. He also had compassion for several mentally handicapped persons, whom he provided for. He also took up the responsibility of nursing his brother disciples and many lay persons when they were ill. He listened to everybody with equal concern and gave importance to everybody's opinion. He was also very sensitive to the feelings of the others.

==== Bravery and indifference ====
He was said to be intrepid in nature. In one incident in Kashmir when the horse of the coach in which he was travelling fell into an abyss, he was saved, but he never lost his equanimity and later said that he was a dispassionate observer of the incident. When the ship in which he was travelling to London was caught in a cyclone in Mediterranean he watched the entire episode calmly and in a detached manner even when his copassengers were mortally afraid. He was indifferent to the apparent faults and weaknesses of the people with whom he worked.

==== Impartiality and detachment ====
Saradananda was also known for his impartial decisions and hence was required to resolve conflicts. He wrote the book "Sri Sri Ramakrishna Lila Prasanga" in a little room in Udbodhan house while managing the operations of the magazine, overseeing the work of Ramakrishna Mission and looking after the holy mother and devotees, in a dispassionate and detached way. After the new administrative body of Ramakrishnia Mission was formed in 1926, Saradananda completely detached himself from all activities of the Mission and took to the life of meditation and contemplation.

==== Legacy ====
He proved his mettle as an organiser. By the time of his death, there were many Ramakrishna Mission centres, throughout India and abroad. In addition to the regular work of the centre, there were relief works and also that of publishing the magazine Udbodhan, writing books and articles, arranging for finances, looking after the spiritual needs of the aspirants, young monks and the devotees, and also looking after the needs of the holy mother's family members. After the death of the holy mother, the women devotees found solace in his company. Once an attendant asked him about his spiritual progress, to which he replied, Did we cut grass in Dakshineswar?, referring to the period of his association with Ramakrishna. He himself mentioned that whatever he had written in the book "Sri Ramakrishna, the great master", on spiritual experiences, were through direct realisation and not from hearsay.

There is a building named Saradananda Bhavana at Ramakrishna Mission Ashrama, Narendrapur and a dormitory named Saradananda Dham at Ramakrishna Mission Ashrama, Deoghar, which are consecrated in his holy name.

==== Quotations ====
- Through selfless work the mind gets purified. And when the mind becomes pure, there arise knowledge and devotion in it.
- Whatever work stands in the way of God-realization and increases discontent is bad work. You should wholly discard it.
- The Ramakrishna Mission does not like to express any opinion, good or bad, about political discussions, for the Master did not instruct us to do anything of the kind, and Swamiji asked the Mission to keep itself aloof from such effort. That is why the Mission has been all along engaging itself in spirituality and service to humanity.
- Now-a-days there are so many religious societies, but people lose all interest in them after a few days. What is the reason for this? The reason is our words are not in accord with our thoughts. The first step in religion is to be sincere to the core.
