= Turiyananda =

Indian Hindu missionary

Swami Turiyananda
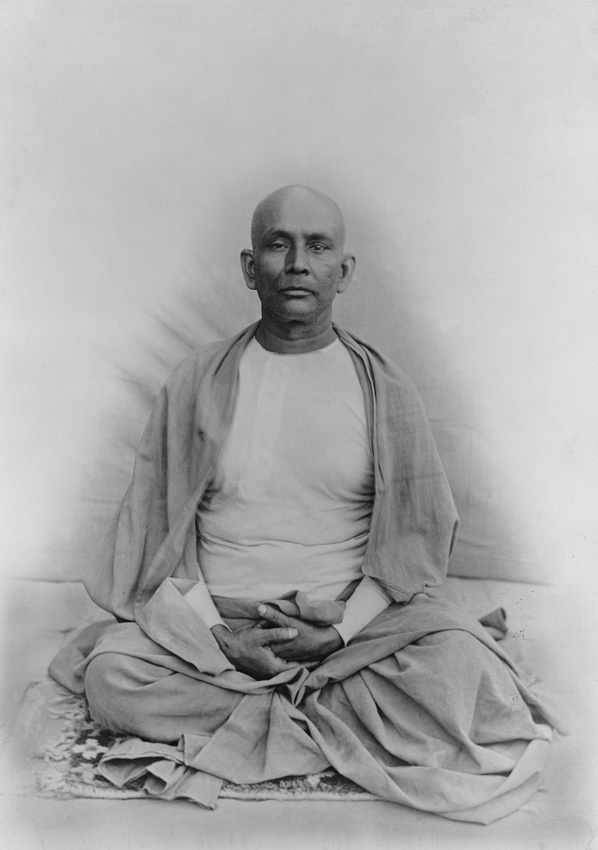
- Turiyananda, c. 1900

Personal life
- Born: Harinath Chattopadhyay; 3 January 1863 Calcutta, Bengal, British India (now West Bengal, India)
- Died: 21 July 1922 (aged 59) Benares, Agra and Oudh, British India (now Uttar Pradesh, India)

Religious life
- Religion: Hinduism
- Philosophy: Advaita Vedanta

Religious career
- Teacher: Ramakrishna

Quotation

Stubbornness is not strength. Stubbornness merely hides one's weakness. Strong is he who is flexible like steel and does not break. Strong is he who can live in harmony with many people and heed opinions other than his own..

Swami Turiyananda or "Hari Maharaj" as he was popularly known as, was a direct monastic disciple of Ramakrishna, the 19th-century Hindu mystic from Bengal. He was one of the earliest missionary to be sent by his leader and brother disciple Swami Vivekananda to the United States of America to preach the message of Vedanta to the western audience from 1899 to 1902. He established the Shanti Ashrama in California, United States. He was a monk of the Ramakrishna Mission. He died in Varanasi, India.

== Biography ==
=== Early life ===
Turiyananda was born as Harinath Chattopadhyay, the youngest of six children, in an affluent Bengali middle-class family in Calcutta on 3 January 1863. His father, Chandranath Chattopadhay, an orthodox Brahmin who lived in the Bagbazar area of Calcutta, was well respected by the people. Harinath lost his parents at a very young age and was brought up by his eldest brother, Mahendranath. His mother Prasannamayi died while trying to save young Harinath from a wild jackal when he was three years old. His father died when he was just twelve years old. In school, Hari paid close attention to all his studies, but his special interest lay in religion and athletics. His ambition was to lead an austere life, observing all the orthodox rules and traditions. After finishing his studies in the Bengali Institution, Hari went to the General Assembly School (now Scottish Church Collegiate School), run by Christian missionaries. However, he was never swayed away by the doctrines of Christianity taught by the missionaries. At a very young age he was inclined towards the study of philosophy and scriptures like the Bhagavad Gita, Upanishads and works of Adi Shankaracharya. He was attracted towards the teachings of Advaita Vedanta, and strove sincerely to live up to that ideal One notable incident that depicted his adherence to the principles of Vedanta was his fearlessness upon a chance encounter with a crocodile. One day while taking a bath in the Ganges, he saw the creature approaching him. Despite warnings from passersby, he did not turn back, and instead, faced the crocodile. He was adhering to the principle of Vedanta that says the same divinity is manifest in all living organisms, and therefore one soul should not be afraid of another.

=== Influence of Sri Ramakrishna ===
Harinath first met Ramakrishna when he was about fourteen years old, when the latter had come to visit a neighbour's house. Harinath went to Dakshineswar temple two or three years later (c.a 1880) and became Ramakrishna's devotee. Harinath's favourite book was the Rama Gita, an Advaita treatise. Harinath had an aversion and horror of women and always avoided them, even if they were little girls. One day he told about it to Ramakrishna. He chastised him, saying "Look down upon women! What for? They are the manifestation of the Divine Mother. Bow down to them as to your mother and hold them in respect. That is the only way to escape their influence. The more you hate them, the more you will fall into the snare." The Master had a very high opinion of his disciple. Sri Ramakrishna said about Harinath, He comes of that transcendent region whence name and form are manufactured. Hari Maharaj's opinion about his Guru was that the bliss he received in the company of his master more than compensated for all the sufferings in his life. Ramakrishna also taught him to overcome lust and desire, along with various other spiritual disciplines. Gradually, under his influence, Harinath transformed into a devotee rather than a steadfast monist.

=== Relationship with Swami Vivekananda ===
During the five or six years he was with Ramakrishna, Hari had many opportunities to meet the other disciples of the Master. Early in this period he met Narendranath Dutta (more familiarly called Naren), who later became Swami Vivekananda who was his close friend and who from the very beginning had made a very deep impression on his mind. Naren too developed a great liking for him and called him brother Hari, or Haribhai. Both lived in Calcutta and often came to see Ramakrishna together. This relationship lasted till the end. When Swami Vivekananda implored Swami Turiyananda to come to America to teach the message of Vedanta, at first he refused, but then his love and respect for the leader prevailed, and he set off on his mission. Swami Vivekananda wrote in a letter from America in 1895, Whenever I think of the wonderful renunciation of Hari, his steadiness of intellect and forbearance, I get a new access to strength.

=== Monastic life ===
After the death of his Master, Hari went to Shillong in Assam for about six months. Afterwards, he returned to Calcutta and stayed with his brother disciples in the "Baranagar Math". In 1887, he took Sannyasa, or the pledge of renunciation, and adopted the name Turiyananda (Turiya – transcendental, Ananda – bliss). He then left the monastery and travelled by foot all the way to the Himalayas. While leading a contemplative life there, he was reunited with Swami Vivekananda and several other brother disciples in Rajpur. Then they travelled together to Rishikesh. After Swami Vivekananda left his brother monks, Turiyananda and Brahmananda travelled further north into the Himalayas. During these days of wandering, he survived on the barest of necessities in the extreme cold weather. He visited the holy shrines of Kedarnath and Badrinath and stayed for some time in Srinagar (Garhwal). Later he met up with Swami Vivekananda in Bombay and Mt. Abu when the latter was preparing to depart for America in 1893. During his travels in Punjab, he heard about Swami Vivekananda's success in the "Chicago Parliament of Religions". Swami Turiyananda came back to the Ramakrishna Math in Alambazar before Vivekananda's arrival in India. At "Alambazar Math" Swami Turiyananda took up the task of training young recruits to the Ramakrishna order, and began taking classes in Vedanta in Calcutta.

=== In America ===
In 1899 when Vivekananda started for America the second time, he requested Turiyananda to accompany him to preach the universal message of Vedanta. At first the latter refused as he was averse to preaching and active life. But finally he relented. He reached New York via England in August 1899. He worked at first in the Vedanta Society of New York and took up additional work at Mont claire. His main interest was in character building based upon principles of Vedanta and this he strived to achieve with a group of young students in Shanti Ashrama, a Vedanta retreat in the San Antonio valley of California, which was set up in an isolated area, far away from any human habitation. From New York, Turiyananda first went to Los Angeles and became quite popular there. From there, he went to San Francisco and worked with students from the Vedanta society of San Francisco. He finally established the Shanti Ashrama with about a dozen students. In Shanti Ashrama the group had to face many hardships and hurdles because of the remote and uninhabited nature of the place. However, this experience was life changing for many of his students, one of whom wrote, To think of Turiyananda is an act of purification of mind, to remember his life, an impulse to new endeavour To many of his students Turiyananda was a living example of Vedanta. Turiyananda had a very strenuous life in Shanti Ashrama and his health broke down. He therefore returned to India in 1902 and heard the tragic news of the passing away of Vivekananda on 4 July 1902.

=== Life of an Ascetic ===
After the death of Vivekananda, Turiyananda left the newly built Belur Math and went to Vrindaban and Uttarkashi. He built an ashrama in Almora together with Swami Shivananda, another brother disciple. He later developed diabetes and was operated upon for a curbuncle, without the use of chloroform or any anesthetic. The last three years of his life were spent at the Ramakrishna Mission Sevashram in Varanasi, where he died on 21 July 1922. Turiyananda spent the next several years practicing intense contemplation in Vrindavan, in different places in the Himalayas, in Dehra Dun, Kankhal, Almora, etc. He finally settled down in Varanasi in February 1919. During the last few years he suffered much from diabetes. He died on 21 July 1922 at Varanasi. Moments before dying he repeated the Upanishadic mantra 'Satyam, Jnanam Anantham Brahma' meaning 'God is Truth, Wisdom and Infinity' along with his brother disciple Swami Akhandananda after which he was heard muttering in Bengali 'Brahma Satya, Jagat Satya; Sab Satya. Satye Pran Pratishtitha' which means `God is Truth, the World is also Truth, Everything is Truth. Life is based on Truth'. This was radically different from the orthodox 'Brahma Satyam Jagad Mithya' meaning God is Truth and the World is false. These unorthodox last words, which were spoken impromptu, has generally been taken as the vision seen by an illumined sage who sees God everywhere.

=== Character and legacy ===
Turiyananda was renowned for his fearlessness. Once, when was harassed by the British police in Northern India, a high ranking police officer asked him whether he was afraid of police. He responded, I do not even fear death, why should I fear any human being?" Later on, the police officer became an admirer and devotee. His method of teaching was through conversation with quotations from holy scriptures. "There are two ways of answering a question," he said. "One is to answer from intellect, the other is to answer from within. I always try to answer from within. Even though he was not actively involved in philanthropic activity of the Ramakrishna Mission, he held it in high regard. He used to say, If one serves the sick and distressed in the right spirit, in one single day one can get the highest realisation. He sympathised with the masses, and encouraged philanthropy and work for the poor and distressed. Turiyananda cared not so much for public work and organisation as upon working personally with a smaller number. His work was based upon individual character building. He preferred the style of an inward, meditative and contemplative life. He seemed to be of the opinion that with large organisations, spiritual work is apt to suffer. "Lectures," he used to say, "are to reach the public, but the real work can be done only through close personal contact, yet both are necessary."

=== Quotes ===
- "Troubles exist as long as we live in the domain of thought. There is no peace until we transcend thought itself. When one kills the mind, the senses come under control. What does it mean to kill the mind? It is to detach it from sense objects. The enlightened person has their senses under perfect control."
- " As long as one expects happiness, one stays restless. But the enlightened soul 'knows bliss in the Atman [the Self within] and wants nothing else. Cravings torment the heart; he renounces cravings. I call such a person illumined.' Craving for happiness brings suffering in its wake."
- "God and mammon cannot be served at the same time. Those who try to compromise are still very much attached to the world. If you want to realize God, renounce all worldliness."
- "Why should you care about public opinion? Good people never criticize others. It is only the wicked who speak ill of their fellow men. Ignore them! The idea of doing good to other people! First help yourself! The illumined souls alone are the true benefactors of this world. They know what is good for mankind. Having attained knowledge, they work for others."
- "You must struggle to meditate and to become deeply absorbed in Him. Try to develop intense devotion to God throughout your life."
- "To preach religion is to give something tangible. it is not like teaching a class from the pages of a book. Religion is something that is transmitted. Hence, before you can give you have to earn."
- "Can God be attained by a little cursory study or meditation? One must have intense yearning for the Lord! Life must seem unbearable without his vision!"
- " Be always sincere, and be yourself. Be true! Have no axe to grind, go always straight for the goal and be strong.
- "Have you seen people play chess? The players sometimes overlook a move because their minds are set on winning the game. But the looker-on will see the move, because his mind is calm, not disturbed by the desire to win. We become ambitious, and thus lose clearness of vision. Ambition sweeps us along, and all prudence is thrown to the winds. Our desires make us blind."

== Gallery ==
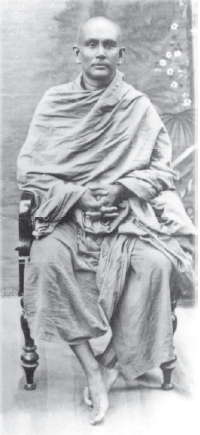

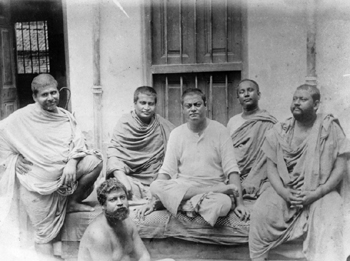
