= Baranagar Math =

First monastery of Ramakrishna Order located in Baranagar, India

Ramakrishna Math Baranagar
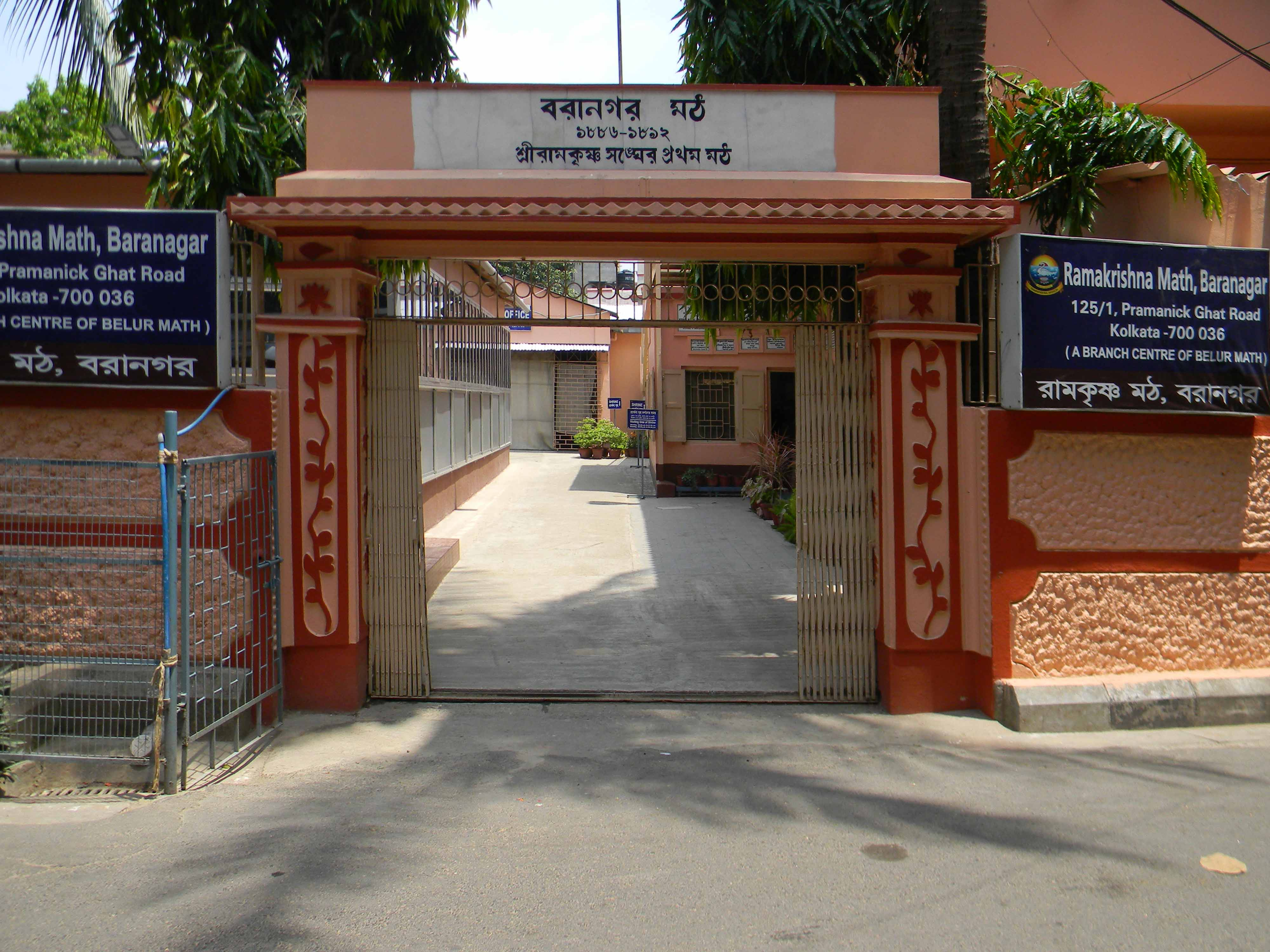
- Entrance of Baranagar Math

- Location within Kolkata Location within West Bengal Location within India
- Alternative names: Baranagar Math

General information
- Status: Active
- Type: Heritage place, museum, branch of Ramakrishna Mission
- Location: 125/1, Pramanick Ghat Road, Baranagar, Kolkata 700036, India
- Coordinates: 22°37′54.7″N 88°22′3″E
- Construction started: 1886
- Renovated: 1973
- Owner: Belur Math

Website
- baranagarmath.rkmm.org

Baranagar Math (Note: Alternative spelling "Baranagore Math", in this spelling of official website is followed.) (Baranagar Monastery) or Ramakrishna Math, Baranagar was the first monastery of Ramakrishna Order. In September 1886, after the death of Ramakrishna, when his devotees stopped funding, Swami Vivekananda (then known as Narendranath Datta) and other disciples of Ramakrishna decided to make a dilapidated house at Baranagar their new math. The house crumbled to dust in 1897. In 1973 Vivekananda Math Samrakshan Samity was formed, which attempted to preserve the area. In 2001, the possession was handed over to Belur Math authority, which soon after declared it as one of its official branches. The restoration and development work of the area is still ongoing.

== History ==
=== Establishment in September 1886 ===
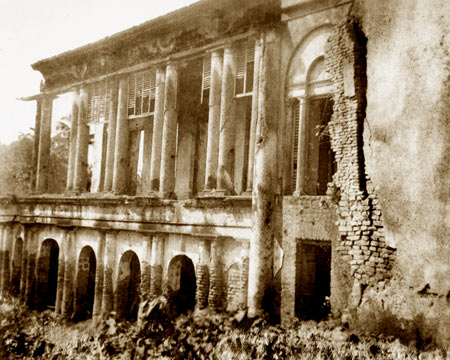
Baranagar Math, dilapidated house of nineteenth century

After the death of Ramakrishna on 16 August 1886, his devotees and admirers stopped funding. Many of his disciples showed inclination to return home and live Grihastha (family-oriented) life. The monastic disciples led by young Narendranath Datta understood the necessity to find out a new shelter. Narendranath and others decided to make dilapidated house at Baranagar the new math (monastery) for remaining disciples. The house belonged to a zaminder family of Taki, North 24 Parganas district.

=== Life at Baranagar Math ===
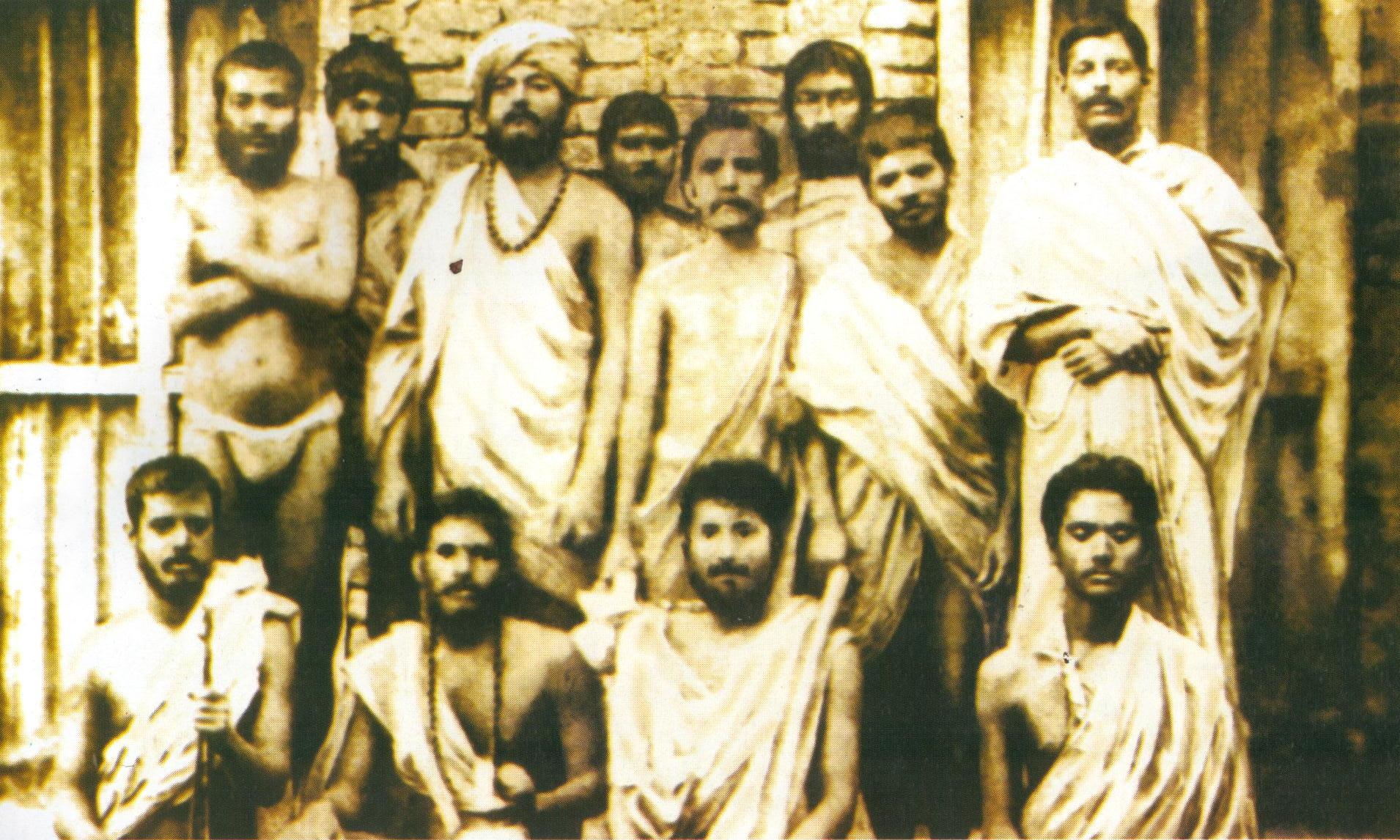
Group photo taken on 30 January 1887 in Baranagar Math, Kolkata. Standing: (l–r) Swami Shivananda, Swami Ramakrishnananda, Swami Vivekananda, Randhuni, Debendranath Majumdar, Mahendranath Gupta (Shri M), Swami Trigunatitananda, H.Mustafi Sitting: (l–r) Swami Niranjanananda, Swami Saradananda, Hutko Gopal, Swami Abhedananda

Surendra Nath Mitra, a devotee of Ramakrishna desired to pay the rent for the house. Narendranath and his guru bhais (Note: Disciples of the same teacher/master are each other's Guru bhai) used to collect their daily food by "holy begging" (madhukari). The math became the first building of the Ramakrishna Math—the monastery of the monastic order of Ramakrishna. Narendra later reminisced about the early days in the monastery:

We underwent a lot of religious practice at the Baranagar Math. We used to get up at 3:00 am and become absorbed in japa and meditation. What a strong spirit of detachment we had in those days! We had no thought even as to whether the world existed or not.

==== Monastic vows ====
In January 1887, Narendranath Datta and eight other disciples of Ramakrishna took formal monastic vows at Baranagr Math.

=== Demolition in 1897 ===
The house, which was already in a dilapidated condition, crumbled down to dust in 1897. No initiative could be taken at that time to restore the house. In the same year, Vivekananda returned from the West.

=== Formation of Baranagar Math Samrakshan Samity (1973) ===
On 25 January 1963, under the supervision and guidance of Swami Ramananda, a monk of Ramakrishna Order, the local people of Baranagar formed a society named "Baranagar Math Samrakshan Samity". The objective of the committee was to preserve the land where Baranagar Math was situated and attempt to re-establish it. In course of time, many buildings, shops and slums covered that area. Baranagar Math Samrakshan Samity managed to occupy a portion of the garden where Baranagar Math stood once. There they started social service activities like running Charitable Homoeopathic Dispensary, Free Coaching Centre (which was named Swami Vivekananda Charitable Coaching Centre) for the poor students of nearby slums etc. Gradually their social activities increased. They opened a non-formal school for children (which was named "Gadadhar Sishu Bikas Kendra"), opened a general library and started organising lectures and religious discourses on a regular basis.

=== Handing over to the Ramakrishna Math and the Ramakrishna Mission (2001) ===
In October 2001, Baranagar Math Samrakshan Samity handed over the land to the authority of Ramakrishna Math and Ramakrishna mission. At that time Belur Math Management (Note: Headquarter of Ramakrishna Math and Mission.) asked Baranagar's local Ramakrishna Mission Centre to take care of the possession. A meeting was held soon, where it was decided by the Governing Body and the Board of Trustees of Ramakrishna Math and Ramakrishna Mission to attempt to restore the place because of its historical significance. It was declared, since 6 January 2004 the place would be considered as an official branch of Belur Math. Swami Vamanananda was appointed as the president of the branch. Thus Baranagar Math came into existence once again. The development and re-establishment works are still going on.

== See also ==
- Baranagore Ramakrishna Mission Ashrama High School
- Ramakrishna Sarada Math
