= Vimalananda =

Vimalananda (also called Khagen Maharaj) (1872–1908) was an Indian spiritual writer who was one of the monastic disciples of Vivekananda and an early monk of the Ramakrishna Order. He was involved in the publication of Prabuddha Bharata. He was actively involved in running day-to-day operations of the Advaita Ashrama at Mayavati during the early days of the Ashrama. He also inaugurated the Ramakrishna Math at Ulsoor in Bangalore in 1906. He died in 1908 at the Mayavati Ashrama.

== Early life ==
Vimlananda was born Khagendranath Chatterjee in a Hindu Brahmin family in 1872 at Baganda village of Howrah district. His father, Benimadhav Chatterjee, was an engineer. His cousin Haripada Chatterjee, later Bodhananda, was also a monastic disciple of Vivekananda. He was interested in philosophy and spirituality from an early age and by the time he joined Ripon College, he was the leader of a group actively pursuing a spiritual life. Also in the group was Kalikrishna, later Virajananda, another monastic disciple of Vivekananda and a president of the Belur Math.

In 1890, he passed his matriculation examination and won a scholarship. He continued with his First Arts studies at Ripon College.

=== Monastic beginnings ===
Khagen was initiated to Ramakrishna's ideals by reading a collection of his teachings by Sureshchandra Dutta and a biography of Ramakrishna by Ram Chandra Datta. They visited Kankurgachhi Yogodyan on the occasion of celebrating Ramakrishna's birth festival by Ramchandra Dutta. In Ripon College he came in close contact with Mahendranath Gupta, (called "M"), the author of Sri Sri Ramakrishna Kathamrita, who was then a professor in the same college. M inspired them to visit the monastic disciples of Ramakrishna in Baranagar Math. In 1892, he went to Jayrambati and met Sarada Devi. He was later initiated by her into spiritual life. He gave up his studies on account of poor health and spent more time in the monastery in the company of the disciples of Sri Ramakrishna.

== Monastic life ==
In 1897, he met Vivekananda when the latter returned from the West and became a disciple. In 1898, he was sent to Mayavati to manage the affairs of the Advaita Ashrama. Vimalananda joined Swami Virajananda as one of the workers of the Mayavati Ashrama. Swami Vivekananda was full of praise for Vimalananda's command of English language. He was involved in editing Prabuddha Bharata. Vimalananda became engaged in work as well as spiritual practices. His health, which was generally sickly, improved in the hilly climate. Swami Vivekananda visited Mayavati in 1901 after the demise of Capt. Sevier. During this period a small shrine was set up by Vimalananda and others for worshiping Sri Ramakrishna with rituals, flowers, incense and other offerings. Swami Vivekananda disapproved of ritualistic worship in Advaita Ashrama which was in his ideal a non-dualistic institution. Vimalananda wrote to the Holy Mother Sri Sarada Devi seeking her opinion in this matter. However, she confirmed that Advaitism was the highest ideal of the Ramakrishna Order, that every member of the order was Advaitin and what Swami Vivekananda did or said in this matter was right. Vimalananda's doubts were thus put to rest.

He came to Allahabad together with his brother disciple Swami Swarupananda and gave some lectures on Vedanta. He came back to Mayavati as his health broke down. He went to Chennai to stay with Swami Ramakrishnananda for a few months. He went to Bangalore to help Swami Atmananda (Shukul Maharaj) helping him run the newly-established Bangalore Ashrama. In 1906 Swami Swarupananda died. Vimalananda therefore returned to Belur Math and turned down offers to visit Vedanta Societies of New York and San Francisco. In the later part of 1906 he returned to Mayavati with Mrs. Sevier. Returning there, he started editing the Complete Works of Swami Vivekananda.

== Illness and death ==
In February 1908 Vimalananda was found to have tuberculosis which was then incurable.

After a brief illness he died on 24 July 1908. Eulogizing him after his death, Swami Saradananda, the then secretary of Belur Math wrote in Udbodhan,

Oh Man! Will you be able to comprehend this offering by a faithful and devoted disciple of his heart's blood to the lotus feet of his chosen Ideal, this offering of spontaneous love completely devoid of selfish motive or hope of reward, his silent and unassuming worship from his heart away from the public gaze?
