= J. J. Goodwin =

British stenographer and disciple of Swami Vivekananda

Josiah John Goodwin
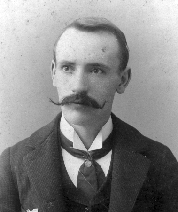
- Born: 20 September 1870; Batheaston, England
- Died: 2 June 1898 (aged 27)
- Occupation: Stenographer

Josiah John Goodwin (20 September 1870 – 2 June 1898) was a British stenographer and a disciple of Indian philosopher Swami Vivekananda. Goodwin is known for recording Vivekananda's speeches, and it is thought that without his efforts most of Vivekananda's works would have been lost.

During his lecture tour in the United States, Vivekananda's disciples could not find a stenographer who could keep pace with his rapid speech. Therefore, his friends and admirers engaged a very expensive court-reporter, J. J. Goodwin.

== Early life and early career ==
Goodwin was born on 20 September 1870 at Batheaston, England. His father Josiah Goodwin was a stenographer and an editor of the Birmingham Advertiser, the Wilts Country Mirror and the Exeter Gazette. Goodwin worked as a journalist from the age of fourteen, and had an unsuccessful journalistic venture in Bath in 1893. He left Bath and travelled to Australia, and later on, to America. Gooodwin mentioned about his early days in a conversation with Swami Saradananda and Mahendranath Dutta. He was a resident of a village near Bath. He had a widowed mother and two unmarried sisters. Goodwin knew shorthand and used to earn his living as a typist in England, Australia and America. He loved cricket, football and also gambling. Swami Vivekananda had joked about him that he was wrongly named as Goodwin and should have been named as Bad Win, alluding to his love of gambling.

== Relationship with Swami Vivekananda and service to Vedanta ==
=== In America ===
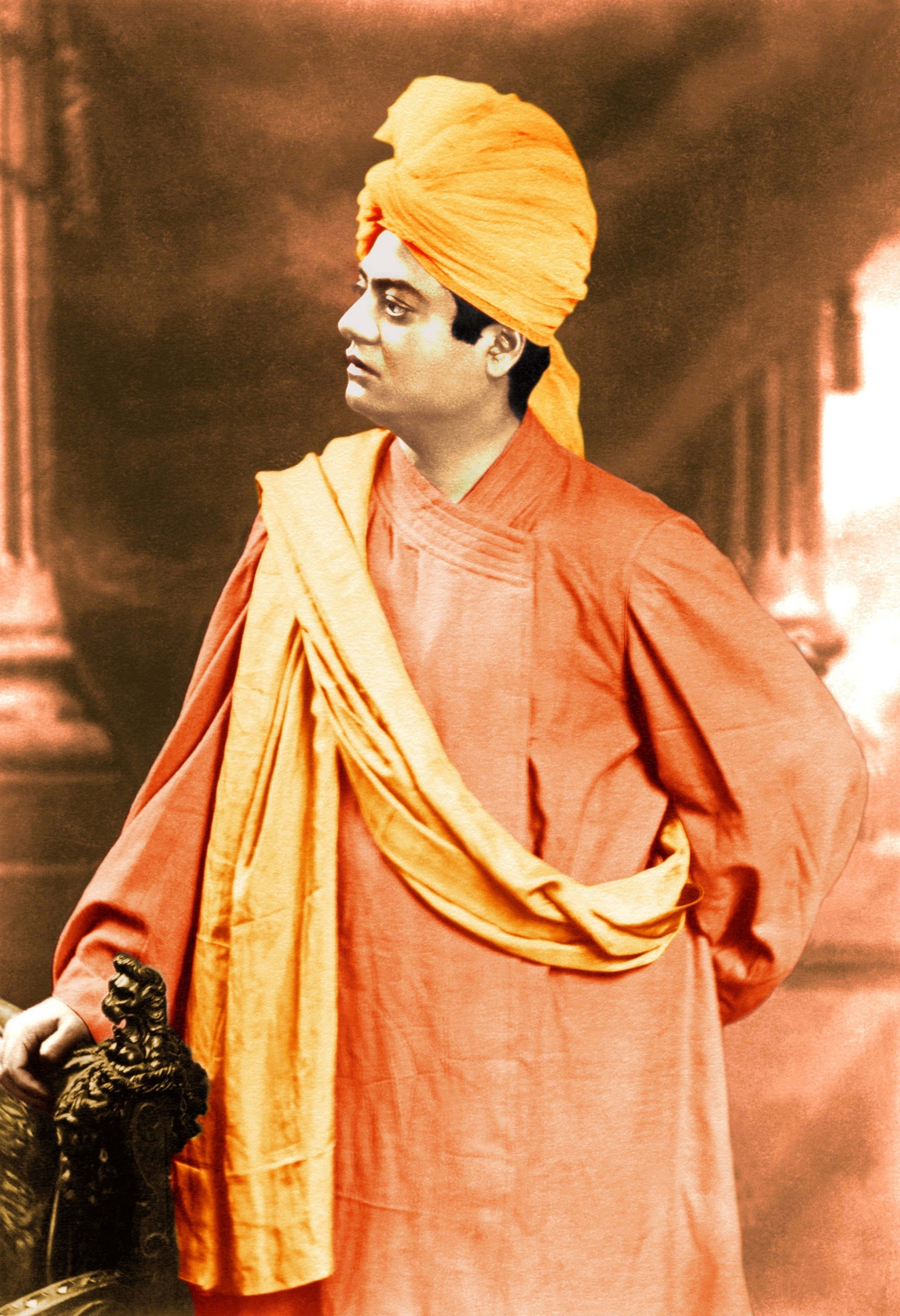
Swami Vivekananda in London in 1896.

After his influential speech at the 1893 Parliament of the World's Religions, Swami Vivekananda travelled around America on a lecture tour. During the tour, Vivekananda's admirers wished to record his lectures and an advertisement was published in December 1895 in two New York newspapers, the Herald and the World. In response to the advertisement, twenty-five-year-old Goodwin applied for the job. He became one of Vivekananda's staunchest followers and played an important role in recording Vivekananda's ex tempore speeches. After the first week, Goodwin refused any money, saying, "If Vivekananda gives his life, the least I can do is to give my service." He accepted only what was necessary for his basic subsistence. Goodwin was a hard worker amidst Vivekananda's strenuous schedule: after taking the lectures stenographically, he would type them and hand over the manuscript to the newspapers and Brahmavadin and used to get prepared for the same work on the following day. Goodwin was appointed by the Vedanta Society of New York, and he rented a room across the street from Vivekananda's. In the weeks between 9 December and 23 December Vivekananda gave at least 20 classes. These lectures were taken down in shorthand by Goodwin. He transcribed them and prepared full lectures for press, while short articles were prepared by another disciple Kripananda. Goodwin then went with Vivekananda to Detroit and the expenses of Goodwin was defrayed by Sara Bull who sent him $100. Goodwin was also very intimate with Sara Bull, and he wrote to her about the Swami's activities and all information pertaining to his lectures and other issues. Goodwin also accompanied the Swami to his lectures in Harvard and took down his lectures. Sara Bull mentioned Goodwin and the Harvard lectures in a letter that she wrote to Mr. E.T Sturdy in England, another disciple of Swami, writing I am much pleased with the Harvard Pamphlet and Professor Everett's preface. Mr. Goodwin supplied us with the material. He is most important aid to the Swami's work, earnest, intelligent and tactful.

=== In England ===
Goodwin also accompanied the Swami to London in the summer of 1896 where they were joined by Swami Saradananda, a brother disciple of Swami Vivekananda. They were guests of Mr. E.T Sturdy and were joined by Mahendranath Dutta, brother of Swami Vivekananda. Goodwin had a most cordial relationship with Swami Saradananda and also encouraged him to give his first lectures in England. Mahendranath describes his impressions about J. J Goodwin that Goodwin was twenty-three or twenty-four years old, but he looked like that of a thirty-five as he had a hard life. His heart was simple and sweet. He loved verbal jousting and if he got no chance to argue with someone he was not happy. He was an ardent British Nationalist and loved cricket and all sports. Goodwin was also a great friend and admirer of Sara Bull. He supported her during her mediation in the conflict between the Vedanta Society of New York and Mr. E.T Sturdy of London over the publishing rights of the books of Vivekananda, esp. his book on Raja Yoga. In England, Sturdy was jealous of Goodwin and Goodwin did not get along with Mrs. Muller, another English disciple and host of Vivekananda. Swami Vivekananda wanted Goodwin to start more active work in America, by publishing a magazine and assist others in the study of Vedanta. Goodwin went with Swami Saradananda to America and arrived there on 2 July 1896. Sara Bull supported both Goodwin and Saradananda during their stay in New York and later in Boston. Goodwin acted as Saradananda's guide in Boston. He even opined against Saradananda teaching Raja Yoga. He was sent back to assist Swami Vivekananda and to take down notes for the final series of lectures in England, and accordingly he went back to London. Goodwin left for India along with Swami Vivekananda and his English disciples, notably the Seviers.

=== In India ===
Goodwin reported to Sara Bull on the rousing welcome received by Swami Vivekananda in India on his arrival. The first of the letters was written on 22 January, India is mad with enthusiasm for him (Swami Vivekananda). Telegrams pour in. The people regard him, in every sense of the word, as a Divine Incarnation – as I do – and are constantly worshiping him. When Vivekananda came to Calcutta, Goodwin accompanied him and served him. Sarat Chandra Çhakravorty, a disciple of Swami Vivekananda and author of the Diary of The Disciple narrated in his book about his first meeting with the Swami where he also mentioned about Goodwin being ever ready to serve the Swami. Goodwin accompanied Vivekananda in his tours in India in 1897 and took shorthand of his lectures from Colombo to Almora. Goodwin later went to Madras and became a Brahmachari. He helped in the publishing of Brahmavadin and worked with Alasinga Perumal, another disciple of Swami Vivekananda. To earn his living he had taken up a temporary job of a correspondent of a local newspaper, Madras Mail. Later he went to Ooty where after playing a game of cricket in rain he caught illness and died from the same on 2 June 1898 at the age of 27 years.

=== Legacy ===
In August 1898, Swami Vivekananda wrote the poem Requiescat in peace in memory of Goodwin. The poem began:

Speed forth, O soul! upon thy star-strewn path,
Speed, blissful one, where thought is ever free,
Where time and sense no longer mist the view,
Eternal peace and blessings be on thee!

J.J Goodwin is remembered and honored as a disciple of Swami Vivekananda to whom are owed most of the lectures of the Swami which are written down accurately. Vivekananda had said on Goodwin, He is chosen for my work. What would I do without him! If I have a mission, he is indeed a part of it.

== Death ==
Goodwin died on 2 June 1898 at the age of 27. He was cremated at Ootcamund (ooty) Christian crematory. Soon after, Vivekananda, who was in India at that time, was informed about it. Very recently, in the same year, Vivekananda had received the news of Indian yogi Pavhari Baba's death too. According to Vivekananda researcher Pravrajika Vrajaprana after receiving the death news of Goodwin, Vivekananda was "visibly disturbed".

In August 1898 Vivekananda wrote in tribute:

With infinite sorrow I learn the sad news of Mr. Goodwin's departure from this life, the more so as it was terribly sudden and therefore prevented all possibilities of my being at his side at the time of death. The debt of gratitude I owe him can never be repaid, and those who think they have been helped by any thought of mine ought to know that almost every word of it was published through the untiring and most unselfish exertions of Mr. Goodwin. In him I have lost a friend true as steel, a disciple of never-failing devotion, a worker who knew not what tiring was, and the world is less rich by one of those few who are born, as it were, to live only for others.

Goodwin's mother and sister wrote to Swami Vivekananda in reply to his condolence letter, thanking him for the influence for good Vivekananda had been to Goodwin.

Swami Saradananda reported in his letter to Sara Bull on 5 June 1898, that Goodwin died on Thursday of typhoid fever. Alasinga Perumal also wrote a letter to Swami Vivekananda informing about the news of Goodwin's death. Sara Bull instructed Alasinga to collect the belongings of Goodwin and take care of necessary legal matters. Alasinga had noted that there were only a few belongings off Goodwin, a bicycle (out of order), a watch and a few papers. Sara also wrote a letter that was published in Brahmavadin on 16 June. A part of her letter wrote, After his experience in New York as stenographer to the Swami, with whom he lived day and night for months, the beauty of life's highest realization, knowledge of the soul and of God, came to him as we know. His entire devotion to the Swami as the servant and friend was the fruit of his new hope and belief and the Swami's public lectures as recorded by Mr. Goodwin are his permanent contribution to us. This young man embodied the integrity and honour of the gentleman to enemy and friend alike, in brief; he was a true Englishman with the spirit of sympathy, responsive to the noble and divine wherever he found it, at home or abroad.

An obituary was also published in Lahore Tribune, which was also published in Indian Mirror. Lahore Tribune mentioned about his trips with Vivekananda to Lahore and Jammu in 1897.

== Bibliography ==
- Vrajaprana, Pravrajika (1999). My Faithful Goodwin. Advaita Ashrama. ISBN 8185301255.
- Badrinath, Chaturvedi (2006). Swami Vivekananda: The Living Vedanta. Penguin Books India. ISBN 978-0-14-306209-7.
- Prabuddhaprana, Pravrajika (2002). Saint Sara The Life of Sara Chapman Bull The American Mother of Swami Vivekananda. Sri Sarada Math. ISBN 8186617337.
