= Swami Sarvapriyananda =

Hindu monk

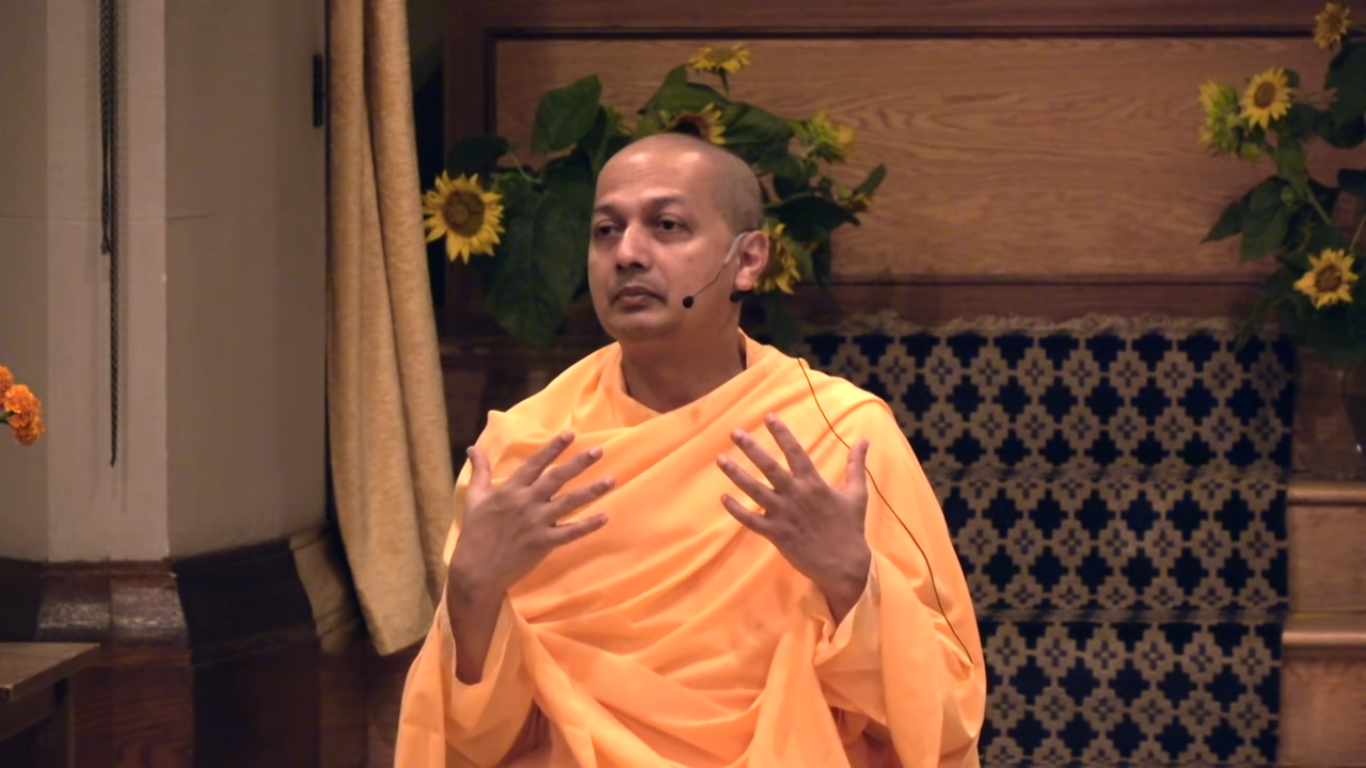

Personal life
- Born: Biswarup Mitra; 10 February 1971 (age 55) Kolkata, West Bengal, India
- Education: MBA from Xavier Institute of Management, Bhubaneswar
- Occupation: Sannyasi at Ramakrishna Order
- Website: www.vedantany.org

Religious life
- Religion: Hinduism
- Philosophy: Advaita Vedanta

Religious career
- Teacher: Swami Bhuteshananda

Swami Sarvapriyananda (born Biswarup Mitra) is a Hindu monk (sannyasi) of the Ramakrishna Order.

Since January 2017 he has been the resident swami and minister in charge of the Vedanta Society of New York.

== Early life and education ==
Sarvapriyananda was born Biswarup Mitra in Kolkata and grew up in Bhubhaneshwar, Odisha. He has said that he was drawn to Ramakrishna and Swami Vivekananda from childhood. His parents and grandparents were initiated devotees in the Ramakrishna Order tradition, and his father was an IAS officer. He completed postgraduate studies in business management at the Xavier Institute of Management, Bhubaneswar, graduating with its 1994 batch.

He has stated that his first goal in life was to become a pilot, and the second was to find God, with the second goal later becoming his only goal.

Sarvapriyananda received mantra initiation into the Ramakrishna Order from Swami Bhuteshananda in 1994. He received sannyasa diksha from Swami Ranganathananda in 2004.

== Monastic life ==
Swami Sarvapriyananda served as an acharya or teacher at Belur Math, the monastic training center, as vice principal of Deoghar Vidyapith Higher Secondary School, and as principal of the Ramakrishna Mission Shikshanamandira (teacher-training college), Belur Math.

In 2015, Swami Sarvapriyananda served as assistant minister of the Vedanta Society of Southern California.

He was later appointed head of the Vedanta Society of New York, a position he has been serving since 6 January 2017. He succeeded Swami Tathagatananda in the role.

He was a Nagral Fellow at Harvard Divinity School from 2019 to 2020 and part of the first group of Hindu monastics in the fellowship.

== Teachings ==
Swami Sarvapriyananda is a proponent and scholar of the Indian Upanishad school of thought and the philosophy or Darshan, particularly of Self and Consciousness contained in them. His public engagements include symposia and events focused on Advaita Vedanta teachings. In an episode of Dispatches from The Well, a podcast by Big Think, he reflects on contributions of Vedanta to the conversation on the Hard problem of consciousness. Fortune India mentions Sarvapriyananda as "one of the best known lecturers of the Vedanta in the world today".

Speaking with Time on the occasion of the International Day of Yoga in 2018, Sarvapriyananda stated that "doing (yoga) the right way can change the way you live, work and love" while criticising the "vulgarisation and distortion of yoga today".

In 2026, Swami Sarvapriyananda was among the theologians and spiritual leaders invited by Anthropic to its San Francisco headquarters to discuss AI ethics and morality.

== Bibliography ==
- Dissolve into Infinity, Juggernaut. 2021.
- What is Vedanta?, Juggernaut. 2021.
- Who Am I?, Juggernaut. 2021.
- Reflections on Dakshinamurti Stotram, Vedanta Society of New York, 2025.
- Mahavakya : The Essence of Vedanta, Vedanta Society of New York, 2025.
- Fullness & Emptiness : Vedanta and Buddhism, Vedanta Society of New York, 2025.
- Conversations on Vedanta in Practice, Vedanta Society of New York, 2025.

== See also ==
- Ranganathananda
- Swami Tathagatananda
- Swami Samarpanananda
- Vedanta Society of New York
- Vedanta Society of Southern California
- Advaita Vedanta
