= Swami Samarpanananda =

Indian monk, author, teacher

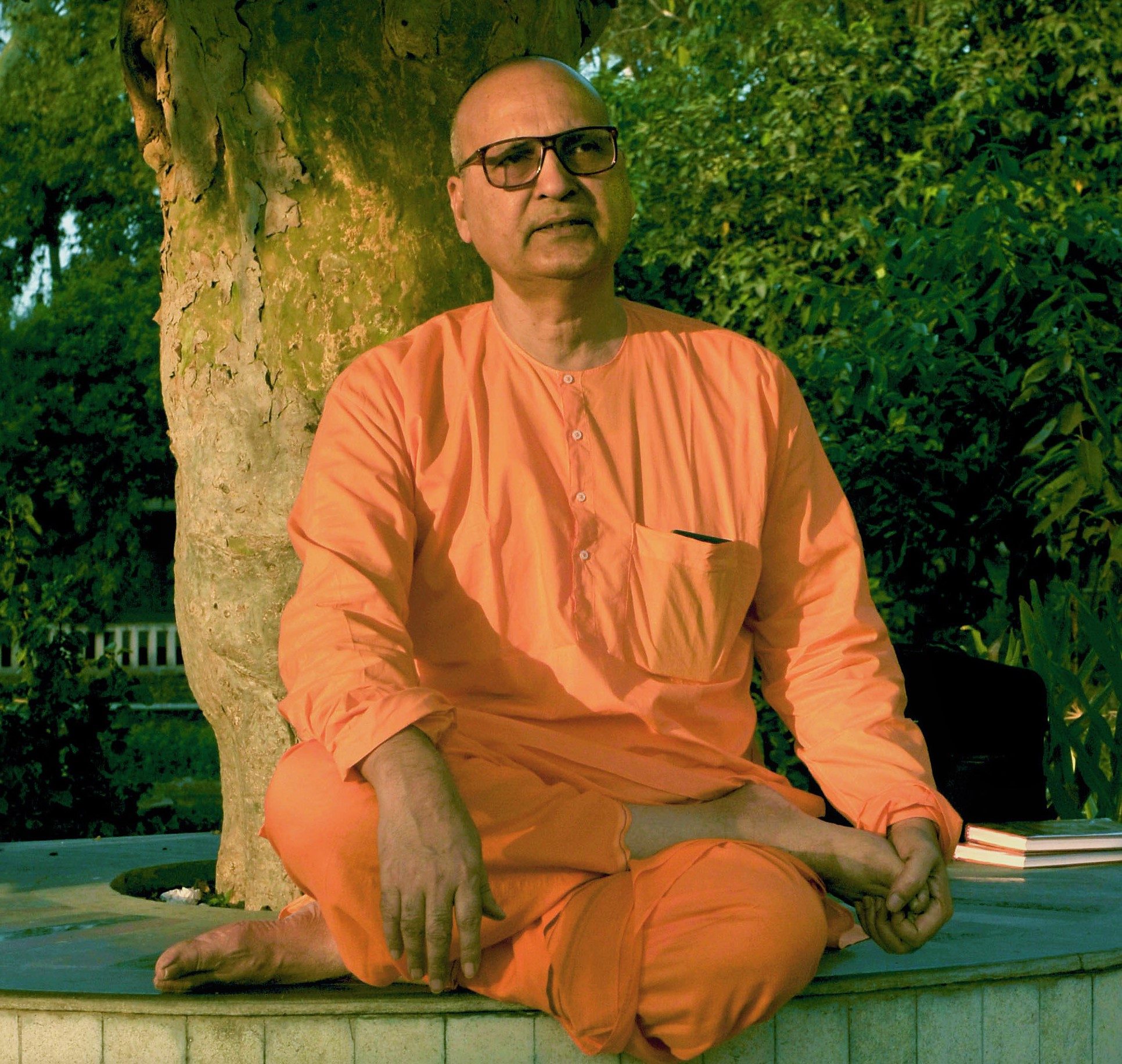
- Born: Ramakrishna; Munger, Bihar
- Occupations: Monk/ Sannyasi writer and teacher
- Writing career
- Pen name: Samarpan
- Years active: 1980-Now
- Genres: Advaita Vedanta, fiction, philosophy
- Subject: Spirituality
- Notable works: Tiya-A Parrot's Journey Home, Param, Junglezen Sheru, Carving a Sky, The World of Religions, Living Hinduism, The Hindu Way

Swami Samarpanananda is an Indian author and a monk of the Ramakrishna Mission, Belur Math.

== Early life ==
He came in contact with the monks of the Ramakrishna Order as a young student. Inspired by them, he joined the organization in 1980 at the age of twenty and became sannyasin (monk) on 2 September 1990 at the age of thirty, as per the norm of the Ramakrishna Mission.

== Career ==
Since his joining the order as a monk, he has worked at various centres of the Ramakrishna Mission, viz. Deoghar, Advaita Ashrama, Aalo (Arunachal Pradesh), Narendrapur, Kanpur, Chapra (Bihar). He was Principal of Ramakrishna Mission Vidyapith, Deoghar, and was the head of Ramakrishna Mission, Chapra, Bihar. Presently he teaches ancient and modern scriptures at Ramakrishna Mission Vivekananda Educational and Research Institute.

His work experience ranges from teaching to management through a lot of other responsibilities. He writes regularly for newspapers, journals and magazines like Prabuddha Bharata and Vedanta Kesari. He has been invited as guest lecturer at various institutions like IITs and IIMs. He is well known as an author and a speaker.

His first book, Tiya-A Parrot's Journey Home, was published in 2009. Dr. APJ Abdul Kalam highly appreciated the book, and recommended it freely as one of the top five must-read books. It is a suggested read for English for Class XI-XII under CBSE Curriculum. (Circular No.03/2012, CBSE/ACAD/DIR (TRG)/2012 dated 11.04.2012). It is also available in Hindi, Bengali, Bhasa Indonesian and as an audiobook.

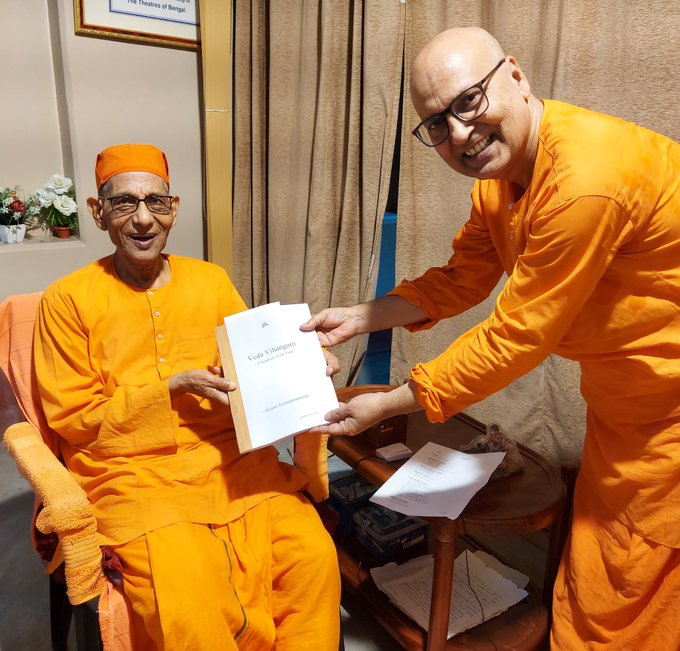
'Veda Vihangam-The Essential Veda' print being presented to Srimat Swami Suhitananda, Vice Present, Ramakrishna Math and Ramakrishna Mission by Swami Samarpanananda

The prime focus of his works is one's growth against all odds through struggle. His teachings are based on Vidya—growth in knowledge, Sampad—creating wealth for the society, Seva—serving others as a way of life, Tyaga—giving up all for God.

== Bibliography ==
- Tiya-A Parrot's Journey Home (HarperCollins, 2009. English Print, Ebook)
- Param (Harper Element, 2012. English Print, Ebook)
- Junglezen Sheru (Pan Macmillan, 2014. English Print, Ebook)
- Carving a Sky-A Perspective on Life (Harper Element, 2016, English Print, EBook)
- Living Hinduism-Scriptures Philosophy Practices (Niyogi Books, 2018. English Print, Ebook)
- The World of Religions (Niyogi Books, 2018. English Print, Ebook)
- The Hindu Way-Freedom to Oneness (Pan Macmillan, 2019 English Print, Ebook)
- Kratu-A Novel (Pan Macmillan, 2021)
- Veda Vihangam (Pan Macmillan, 2023)
- Arohan: Ascent with Gita (Pan Macmillan, 2024)
- Failing Upward (Pan Macmillan, 2025)
- Articles
