= Sali River (West Bengal) =

Coordinates: 23°13′37″N 87°36′37″E

Location
- Country: India
- State: West Bengal

Physical characteristics
- Source: Kora Hill
  - location: Bankura, India
- Mouth
  - location: Somsar
- Discharge
  - location: Damodar River

Sali River (In Bengali 'শালি') is an important tributary of Damodar River that drains the northern part of Bankura district in the Indian state of West Bengal. It originates a few miles west of Kora hill, halfway between Mejia and Bankura, and joins the Damodar at Somsar village in Indas police station. It is a rain-fed river.
