= Dvadasaha =

Dvādaśāha – (Sanskrit: द्वादशाह) literally means the twelve-day sacrifice.

The Soma sacrifice that takes twelve-days is called Dvādaśāha in which a ten-day sequence called dāśa-rātra, is flanked by two intensive day and overnight sacrifices called atirātras as opening and closing days. The Agnistoma serves as the paradigm for all Soma sacrifices up to those of twelve days duration, the Dvādaśāha soma sacrifice is paradigmatic for Soma sacrifices of twelve days and more. The Aitareya Brahmana and the Kausitaki Brahmana, belong to the Rig Veda, both preserve this Rig Vedic rite. The Aitareya Brahmana (IV.25) calls the Dvādaśāha sacrifice as the 'sacrifice of Prajapati', and the Jaiminiya Brahmana (III.302) calls the stomas of Dvādaśāha as the 'powerful sons of Prajapati'.

The twelve-days Soma sacrifices are called Ahinas, and the longer ones are called Sattras. The Aitreya Brahmana describes the Dvādaśāha sacrifice in its Pancika IV.iv.23 to V.iv.25, beginning with the origin and the initial ritual of this sacrifice. The first six Prishtha days of the Dvādaśāha sacrifice represent the mouth, the Chandomah days are the seventh to the ninth which represent what is in the mouth as tongue palate and teeth; but that by which one produces articulate sounds of speech or by which one distinguishes sweet and not sweet, is the tenth day which is the 'day of happiness'. Those desirous of prosperity perform this ritual. The fundamental scheme of the sattras is that of a Dvādaśāha comprising a prayaniya-atiratra (one day), a prishthaya-shada-aha (six days), chandomas (three days), an avivakya (one day) and an udayaniya-atiratra (one day), which programme can be suitably extended.

The Dvādaśāha sacrifice is both, Ahina and Sattra types of Soma sacrifice, the former is Vyudha, and the latter, Samudha. In the Sattra type of session, there is no sacrifice, only Brahmins perform this ritual. In this context, Badarayana states:-

द्वादशाहवदुभयविधं बादरायणोऽतः |

"Hence Bādarāyana considers the released souls to be of both kinds (i.e. with or without bodies and senses) just as it is the case with the Dvādaśāha (twelve-day) sacrifice." - (Brahma Sutras IV.iv.12)

Shankara explains that when a liberated soul wishes to have a body, he gets one; and when he desires to remain without it, he has none; for his will is true and desires are diverse like the Dvādaśāha which can be both a sattra and an ahina, because of the injunction about the sacrifice itself and the specification of the sacrificer. And, Gambhirananda clarifies that Dvādaśāha becomes Ahina when there is injunction about it along with the specification of its performer; it is Sattra when it is resorted to by many performers.
