= Swami Kirtidananda =

Swami Kirtidananda (1925-2007) was born as Srikantayya in an orthodox family at Bangalore on 25 June 1925. He had his education at National High School and graduated from Central College. He later joined the Ramakrishna Math in 1946 at its Bangalore Centre under Tyagishananda. He had mantra deeksha from Virajananda, the 6th President of the Ramakrishna Sangha and had sannyasa deeksha from Shankarananda in 1957.

== Locations he served ==
1. Ramakrishna Mission/Math centres in Colombo
2. Advaita Ashrama at Kolkota
3. Advaita Ashrama at Mayavati
4. Ramakrishna Mission Hostel, T. Nagar in Chennai
5. B. T. College Hostel, Saradapith
6. Ramakrishna Math, Kalimpong
7. Head of Ramakrishna Mission, Along Centre in Arunachal Pradesh
8. Ramakrishna Mission Students’ Home, Chennai
9. Ramakrishna Math, Chandigarh

== Career ==
He was the Joint-Editor of Prabuddha Bharata during 1964-66.

He was a monk of deep scriptural knowledge, a thinker and writer, conversationalist and an organizer. He was orthodox by nature. His article "Half a decade in the Enchanting Environs of Along" in Prabuddha Bharata Jan-June 2003 issues and "Descent of the Divine at Lohaghat" in 1999 Mayavati Centenary issue of Prabuddha Bharata are appreciated besides his articles expressing his personality.

== Death ==
He died on 10 June 2007 at Ramakrishna Math, Ulsoor in Bangalore, where he was leading his retired life.
