= Swami Yatiswarananda =

Vice-president of the Ramkrishna Order

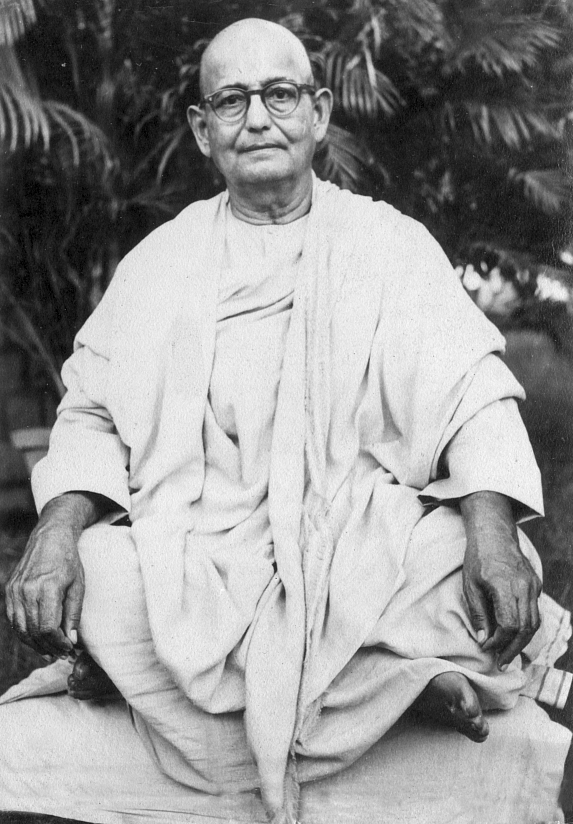
- Swami Yatiswarananda at Bangalore Ashrama

Personal life
- Born: 16 January 1889 Nandanpur Village, Pabna district, British India (Present day in Bangladesh)
- Died: 27 January 1966 (aged 77) Calcutta, India
- Notable work(s): Meditation and Spiritual life, The Eternal Companion, Adventures in Spiritual Life, Essentials of Spiritual Life, How to Seek God, Universal Prayers.

Religious life
- Religion: Hinduism
- Philosophy: Advaita Vedanta

Religious career
- Teacher: Swami Brahmananda

Swami Yatiswarananda (16 January 1889 Nadanpur Village, Pabna, British India–27 January 1966 Kolkata, India) was a vice-president of Ramakrishna Order, whose headquarter is in Belur Math. He was a disciple of Swami Brahmananda, who was a brother disciple of Swami Vivekananda and a direct disciple and spiritual son of Ramakrishna. He served in Philadelphia propagating the message of Vedanta. He was the president of Bangalore centre of Ramakrishna Math. He founded an ashrama in Switzerland.

== Brief biography ==
Yatiswarananda was born as Suresh Chandra Bhattacharya in erstwhile Bengal. He joined the Ramakrishna Order in Belur Math and got initiation from Swami Brahmananda, a direct disciple of Sri Ramakrishna (also referred to as the "spiritual son" of Ramakrishna) the first president of the Ramakrishna Order. During his early days as an itinerant monk, he performed austerities on the banks of the rivers Kaveri and Tamraparni and on the seashore at Tiruchendur in Tamil Nadu.

He went to preach Vedanta in Europe and stayed in Wiesbaden in Germany. He spread the message of Vedanta in Germany, Switzerland, Netherlands, Scandinavia, France and other European nations. When the Second World War broke out, he left Europe and arrived in the United States. He set up the Vedanta Centre of Philadelphia and worked as it's in charge for seven years. He returned to India and settled in Bangalore. In 1951 after the death of Tyagishananda, the president of Bangalore Ramakrishna Math, Yatiswarananda became the president of Bangalore Ashrama. He was instrumental in setting up the Vivekananda Balaka Sangha, an institution devoted to education of young students. He also established the new temple in the Ashrama. Though not a president or vice president of Ramakrishna Order in Belur Math, Yatiswarananda was vested with the special power to initiate disciples by Shivananda (direct disciple of Ramakrishna), the second president of Ramakrishna Order. Later he also became a Vice President of Ramakrishna Math and Mission. In 1965 upon the demise of President Madhavananda, Yatiswarananda was offered the president ship which he refused on account of his ill health. He took a very active role in organizing the Vivekananda Centenary Celebrations in 1963. He died in the Ramakrishna Mission Seva Pratisthan in Kolkata in 1966.

== Early life ==
Swami Yatiswarananda was born on 16 January 1889 in Nandanpur, district Pabna of East Bengal. His pre monastic life was Suresh Chandra Bhattacharya. He had his early education in Jalpaigudi and Bogra and he passed entrance examination from a school in Rangpur in Bangladesh. He studied in Rajshahi and cooch Behar colleges and then from Bangabasi college in Kolkata. He did his Bachelor of Arts (graduation) from Presidency College in Kolkata. He secured a gold medal for being the first in Sanskrit in Calcutta University. He continued post graduate study in Chemistry but did not complete it. He joined the Ramakrishna Order in 1911 at the age of 22 and came in contact with eminent monks and direct disciples of Sri Ramakrishna, like Swami Brahmananda, Baburam Maharaj (Swami Premananda) and Swami Shivananda. He was initiated into Sannyasa (monkhood) in 1917 by Swami Brahmananda in Madras.

== Monastic life ==
Between 1921 and 1924 he was the editor of Prabuddha Bharata, in Advaita Ashrama at Mayavati. In 1924, he became the president of Ramakrishna Math, Bombay and continued till 1926. He remained the president of Sri Ramakrishna Math at Mylapore, Madras, between 1926 and 1933. In 1928, he was appointed a member of the Board of Trustees of Ramakrishna Math and the Governing Body of Ramakrishna Mission, Belur Math. In 1933 his first book, Universal Prayers, was published by Sri Ramakrishna Math, Madras. In 1933 at the invitation of the devotees he was deputed to Wiesbaden in the Rhineland (Germany) for preaching Vedanta philosophy to the interested people. He stayed in Wiesbaden and toured to St. Moris, Geneva and other places of Switzerland between 1935 and 1938. He extended his activities to Europe and preached Vedanta as propounded by Vivekananda and Ramakrishna in London, Paris, the Hague, and in Scandinavia. In 1935 his second book The Divine Life was published by Sri Ramakrishna Math, adras. When the war started in Europe, he left Germany for the United States and in 1942 started a Vedanta centre in Philadelphia. He continued as the minister in charge of the Philadelphia centre till 1949 and then returned to India via Europe in 1950. In 1951, he became the president of Ramakrishna Ashrama in Bangalore after the demise of the then head, Swami Tyagiswarananda. In 1952, he was authorized by the trustees of the Belur Math to give spiritual initiation. He continued as the head of Bangalore centre and traveled to Madras, Bombay, Rangoon, Malaysia, New Delhi, Nagpur and various other places where he initiated many people. He established the Vivekananda Balaka Sangha in Banaglore Ashrama and also actively encouraged a group of women devotees to join Sri Sarada Math. The notable women disciple of Swami Yatishwaranandaji are Pravrajika Amalaprana Mataji, the general secretary of Sri Sarada Math and Ramakrishna Sarada Mission, Pravrajika Devaprana Mataji, secretary of Ramkrishna Sarada Mission, Sister Nibedita Girls High School and Pravrajika Saradaprana Mataji. In 1959, he undertook the construction and consecration of the new temple at Ramakrishna ashrama in Basavanagudi in Bangalore. In 1959 his book Adventures in Religious Life was published. In 1962, he was elected as the Vice President of the Ramakrishna Math and Mission, and he continued with the post till his death. Because of ill health, he declined the post of President of the Ramakrishna Order offered to him by the trustees after Madhavananda died in 1965. He himself died in Belur Math on 27 January 1966.

== List of books authored by Swami Yatiswarananda ==
1. Meditation and Spiritual Life, pages 705, published by Advaita Ashrama.

A posthumous publication based on the class notes of his lectures, the book is divided as follows: Part One - The Spiritual Ideal, Part Two - Spiritual Practice - i) Preparation ii) Techniques, Part Three - Spiritual Experience, Part Four - Spiritual Tidbits. The book has been translated into Hindi, Bengali, Kannada, Malayalam, Tamil, Telugu and Marathi. It was first published in 1979 from Bangalore ashrama.

1. Universal Prayers, selected and translated verses from Sanskrit religious literature, page 261, first published in Nov 1933, from Sri Ramakrishna Math, Madras.
2. The Divine Life - This has 14 chapters like Self and the Body, The Ways of Spiritual and the Worldly, Moral Culture, the Path of Selfless Activity, the Way of the Ideal Man etc., containing Sanskrit verses from Gita, Puranas, Upanishads and other texts with English translations, first published in October 1935.
3. Adventures in Religious Life, page 294
4. Essentials of Spiritual Life, which is the introduction to the Divine Life made into a separate booklet
5. How to seek God - based on his class notes collected by various devotees and later published in Vedanta Kesari.

== Related links ==
- Meditation and Spiritual Life - Swami Yatiswarananda ISBN 81-7907-015-8
- Universal Prayers - Swami Yatishwarananda ISBN 81-7120-511-9
- Adventures in Religious Life - Swami Yatiswarananda ISBN 81-7120-473-2
- The Divine Life, Its Practice and Realisation - Swami Yatiswarananda
- Reflections on Hinduism - Swami Yatiswarananda
- Overcoming Obstacles in Spiritual Life - Swami Yatiswarananda
- How to become Spiritually awakened - Swami Yatiswarananda
- Eternal Companion : life and teachings of Swami Brahmananda - Swami Prabhavananda & Swami Yatiswarananda
- Six Lighted Windows - Swami Yogeshananda ISBN 0-87481-410-3
