= List of magazines by Ramakrishna Mission =

The following are the magazines of Ramakrishna Mission. The magazines of Ramakrishna Mission focus on spirituality, vedanta, religious studies, and service activities.

Periodicals
	Name	ISSN	Running year	Language	Periodicity	Centre
1	Prabuddha Bharata	0032-6178	125th	English	Monthly	Advaita Ashrama Mayavati, Uttarakhand
2	Udbodhan	0971-4316	121st	Bengali	Monthly	Baghbazar, Kolkata
3	The Vedanta Kesari	0042-2983	107th	English	Monthly	Mylapore, Chennai
4	Sri Ramakrishna Vijayam	0972-4400	100th	Tamil	Monthly	Mylapore, Chennai
5	Jivan Vikas	-	64th	Marathi	Monthly	Nagpur, Maharashtra
6	Vivek Jyoti	2582-0656	56th	Hindi	Monthly	Raipur, Chhattisgarh
7	Vivek Prabha	-	6th	Odia	Monthly	Bhubaneswar, Odisha
8	Viveka Prabha	-	21st	Kannada	Monthly	Mysuru, Karnataka
9	Vivek Bhaskar	-	8th	Assamese	Quarterly	Guwahati, Assam
10	Prabuddha Keralam	-	106th	Malayalam	Monthly	Thrissur, Kerala
11	Sri Ramakrishna Prabha	-	76th	Telugu	Monthly	Hyderabad, Telangana
12	Vedanta	-	67th	English	Bimonthly	Bourne End, UK
13	Global Vedanta	1089-6902	22nd	English	Bimonthly	Seattle, USA
14	La revue Védanta	-	47th	French	Quarterly	Gretz, France
15	Fumetsu No Kotoba	-	-	Japanese	Bimonthly	Kanagawa ken, Japan
16	Nirvana	-	-	English	Quarterly	Singapore
