= Sheru =

Sheru may refer to

- Vithika Sheru (born 1994), Indian actress
- Junglezen Sheru, a book by Swami Samarpanananda
