= Tiya: A Parrot's Journey Home =

Indian book about Hinduism

- Book cover
- Author: Swami Samarpanananda
- Cover artist: Tara Goswami
- Language: English
- Subject: Spirituality, adventure
- Publisher: HarperCollins
- Publication date: 27 July 2009
- Publication place: India
- Pages: 196
- ISBN: 978-81-7223-832-2

Tiya: A Parrot's Journey Home is a book written by Swami Samarpanananda. The narrative follows the journey of a parrot as it meanders through various lands, seeking to transcend its own limitations. The underlying theme of the narrative is the quest for salvation.

== Overview ==
The two birds – the one that tastes and the sakshi (the unattached) – represent the essence of Tiya. The story begins with Tiya as an enthusiastic taster who evolves into the sakshi. One might wonder if all those adventures are truly necessary—why can't Tiya be initiated by the benevolent Hans for self-realization in one shot? Tiya is energetic and curious, seeking new experiences and adventures (and misadventures), and the culmination of this journey leads to a sagely and detached seer and watcher.

An analysis of the Mahabharata has observed that the Gita couldn't have been revealed to someone who hasn't struggled with his inner demons and got wounded and thrashed in the process. Arjuna's wrestling bout with the Kirata is said to be this very struggle. More than Shiva in disguise, the Kirata is said to personify the barbaric energy locked up within each individual. A vigorous and ultimately futile bout against this energy is what really was Arjuna's essential preparation for the Gita. The sight of near and dear ones arrayed on the other side was but a trigger.

Likewise, Tiya's journey, driven directed by passions and urges within, often left him battered and bruised ( and sometimes worse off than that ) and this long journey is no stray wandering but essential preparation for him to see light at the end. And Hans, the Guru who guides unobtrusively but decisively.

== Adaptations ==
Tiya is available in 6 languages: English, Hindi, Bengali, Indonesian, Gujarati, Kannada. It is also available in audio form. A movie "Tiya" is under progress with Edgeworx Studios, LLC, New York.

Tiya bagged comments from former President of India, Dr. A. P. J. Abdul Kalam who wrote in 2009, "for the first time I have read a great book in the past five years". Later he listed the book in one of the five must read books.

Tiya has also been prescribed as suggested read for English for class XI-XII students under CBSE Curriculum.( Circular No. 03/2012, CBSE/ACAD/DIR (TRG)/2012 dated 11.04.2012 )

== Characters and places ==
1. Tiya – The main character, a parrot, inexperienced about the world around it.

2. The Banyan – The tree on which Tiya lives with other birds. The Banyan depicts the world. The Banyan is home to various bird species and some species have been highlighted to bring up the idea of our day to day interactions in the world.

3. Hans – The second most important character, after Tiya, whose significance is brought out at the end of the story. Hans is the great teacher, detached, yet caring.

4. Adventures – Each land and location in which Tiya arrives, represents an emotion.

5. The Land of eternity – It is that state of consciousness when one becomes oblivious of the external and lives only with the internal. The state of Turiya.

The book presents the spiritual growth of a person through the path of Yoga-Vedanta.
