= Alasinga Perumal =

Indian Hindu leader

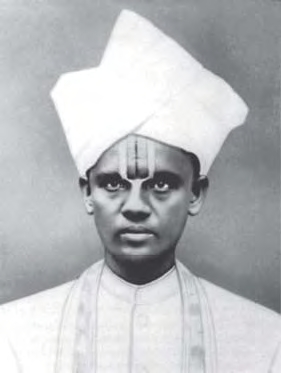

Personal life
- Born: Mandam Chakravarti Alasinga Perumal; 1865 Chikkamagalur
- Died: 11 May 1909 (aged 43–44)

Religious life
- Religion: Hinduism
- Philosophy: Vedanta

Religious career
- Teacher: Swami Vivekananda

Alasinga Perumal (1865 – 11 May 1909) was a propagator of Vedanta and an ardent follower of Swami Vivekananda. Born in an orthodox Vaishnavite family at Chikkamagalur of Mysore, he took his education in Madras. After obtaining a B.A. degree in science, he started his career as a school teacher.

Around 1890–1891, he got the information of the upcoming Parliament of the World's Religions of 1893. Alasinga and his friends felt this could be a wonderful opportunity for them to present the ideals of Hinduism and Vedanta to the world. In December 1892 Vivekananda went to Madras and when Alasinga and his friends met him, they immediately felt that Vivekananda was the best candidate to represent India in the Parliament. He and his friends worked to collect money for Vivekananda' journey. In August 1893, Vivekananda informed Alasinga from America about the financial troubles he was facing at that time. After receiving this information, Alasinga borrowed ₹ 1000 from a merchant, and even sold his wife's gold ornament to collect money for Vivekananda.

In 1896, under the inspiration of Vivekananda, Alasinga started publishing a religious journal Brahmavadin. The journal published until 1914 and then inspired Vedanta Kesari. Alasinga died on 11 May 1909 when he was just forty-four years old.

== Early life and education ==
Perumal was born in 1865 as Mandam Chakravarti Alasinga Perumal (shortened to M. C. Alasinga Perumal) to an orthodox Vaishnavite family in Chikkamagalur, in the former state of Mysore (the current state of Karnataka). His nickname was Achinga. Perumal's father, Chakravarti Narasimhacharya, was a Thenkalai Sri Vaishnavite and an employee of the local municipality office. Due to low wages at this job, Narasimhacharya was unable to sustain his family in Chikkamagalur. In 1870, he came to Madras (now named Chennai) in search of a job and managed to find employment in the Customs Department. Young Alasinga Perumal was sent to Hindu High School first. After completing his school studies from there, he was admitted in Presidency College, Madras, for pre-university courses. He then studied at Madras Christian College. At Madras Christian College, Rev. William Miller, principal of the college at that time, was very much pleased with the studious Alasinga and arranged a scholarship for him. In 1884, he graduated with a B.A. degree in science. He then started pursuing a course in law, but could not finish due to the poor financial condition of his family.

== Marriage and personal life ==
While studying at the Presidency College, Madras, Alasinga married Rangamma, a girl from a Karnataka Iyengar family. Rangamma was a pious Hindu woman who stood by her husband in all the troubles and difficulties Alasinga faced in life. Rangamma died in 1905.

== Career ==
After finishing his studies in 1885, Alasinga went to Kumbakonam, and then to Chidambaram, leaving his family behind in Madras. In both these towns, he worked as a school teacher. He came back to Madras in 1889 when his father Chakravarti Narasimhacharya died and decided to settle there. In Madras, he taught as well, working for Pachaiyappa's School in George Town. Within a few years he was promoted to headmaster. Alsinga retained this position for the rest of his life. In 1909, one year prior to his death, Alasinga was appointed as a professor of physics at Pachaiyappa's College.

== Relationship with Swami Vivekananda ==
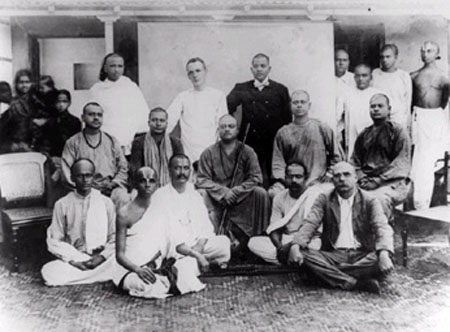
Sitting on chair (L—R): Tarapada (a monk from another order), Swami Shivananda, Swami Vivekananda, Swami Niranjanananda, Swami Sadananda. Standing (L—R): Alasinga Perumal, J. J. Goodwin, M. N. Banerjee, and other devotees from Madras. Front row (L—R): (second) Biligiri Iyengar, (fourth) M. C. Nanjunda Rao.

Around 1890–1891, Alasinga heard about the upcoming Parliament of the World's Religions being held in Chicago, in the United States in 1893 from S. Parthasarathy Aiyangar. Alasinga and his friends thought this could be a good opportunity for them to present the ideals of Hinduism and Vedanta to the world. They started to search for the best person who could represent India and Vedanta in the Parliament. In December 1892 Swami Vivekananda went to Madras and was staying at the house of Manmathanath Bhattacharya, the first Indian accountant-general of the city. Very soon, Vivekananda was introduced to the public of the city at the Triplicane literary society. Alasinga was an active member of this society. He heard Vivekananda's lecture and felt that he was the right candidate to represent them in Chicago. Alasinga met Vivekananda, they talked, shared their views, their opinions on Vedanta and their motherland and informed Vivekananda about their plans. Vivekananda agreed to visit America as a representative of India (Vivekananda had already been asked the same by the king of Mysore, the Raja of Ramnad and few other disciples).

After Vivekananda agreed to go to America, a committee was formed under the leadership of Alasinga to raise funds for the tour. The task of collecting money was difficult. Alasinga even went door to door in hopes of getting money; finally they gathered of ₹ 500. At this time the king of Ramnad failed to make good on his promise of financial support for the tour. This made the situation difficult and Vivekananda had second thoughts about participating in the Parliament. The collected money was returned to the donors.

At this, Alsinga started to feel disappointed, but, at the same time, Vivekananda went to Hyderabad where people requested and encouraged him to go to America as a preacher. The Nizam of Hyderabad too promised to donate ₹ 1000 for the journey and other expenditures. Vivekananda also had a dream involving his master, Ramakrishna, where he asked him to go to America. Thus, the planning was revived once again.

Alasinga and other members of his team started collecting money with new enthusiasm and very soon they gathered ₹ 4000. Vivekananda departed on his journey for America from Bombay.

After reaching America, Vivekananda learned that the Parliament would not start until September 1893. He started facing financial trouble. On 20 August he wrote a letter to Alasinga where he related—

The expense I am bound to run into here is awful. You remember, you gave me £170 in notes and £9 in cash. It has come down to £130 in all!! On an average it costs me £1 every day; a cigar costs eight annas of our money. The Americans are so rich that they spend money like water, and by forced legislation keep up the price of everything so high that no other nation on earth can approach it. Every common coolie earns nine or ten rupees a day and spends as much. All those rosy ideas we had before starting have melted, and I have now to fight against impossibilities. A hundred times I had a mind to go out of the country and come back to India.

... ... ...

After such a struggle, I am not going to give up easily. Only try your best to help me as much as you can; and even if you cannot, I must try to the end. And even if I die of cold or disease or hunger here, you take up the task. Holiness sincerity, and faith. I have left instructions with Cooks to forward any letter or money to me wherever I am. Rome was not built in a day. If you can keep me here for six months at least, I hope everything will come right. In the meantime, I am trying my best to find any plank I can float upon. And if I find out any means to support myself, I shall write to you immediately.

Right after getting this letter, Alasinga started collecting money once again. He borrowed ₹ 1000 from a merchant and even sold his wife's gold ornaments to gather money. He sent the funds to Vivekananda through telegraph service.

Though Vivekananda received very warm receptions in almost every city of America and England and his Parliament of Religion speeches were covered by the most notable newspapers of America, in India, these events and successes initially got almost no newspaper coverage. To popularize Vivekananda's efforts and success in India, Alasinga organized a meeting at Pachaiyappa's Hall, Madras on 28 April 1894. The meeting was attended by many notable and reputable people of the city, such as Rajah Sir Savalai Ramaswamy Mudaliar, S. Subramania Iyer and Dewan Bahadur Raghunatha Rao. In the meeting, a resolution was passed to thank Vivekananda for his works and effort. This public meeting received wide media coverage. After this Alasinga organized similar meetings in other cities like Kumbakonam, Bangalore and Mysore as well.

== Other activities ==
In 1894, Alasinga founded a religious organisation named "Young Men's Hindu Association". In the next year he started his literary career.

=== Brahmavadin ===
Under inspiration of Swami Vivekananda, Alasinga with two other disciples of Vivekananda, Dr. M.C. Nanjunda Row and Venkataranga Raos, started publishing Brahmavadin, a journal on Hindu religion and Vedanta philosophy. The first issue of the journal was published on 14 September 1895 by the Brahmavadin Press. After the death of Alasinga the journal's publishing schedule became quite irregular. The last issue of the journal was published in May—June 1914. It was succeeded by the journal Vedanta Kesari. Vivekananda himself contributed articles for this journal.
