= The Fatal Rumour =

The Fatal Rumour: A Nineteenth-Century Indian Novel (Tamil: ஆபத்துக்கிடமான அபவாதம் அல்லது கமலாம்பாள் சரித்திரம், Aabattukkitamaana Apavaatam allatu Kamalaambaal Charittiram) is a Tamil-language novel by B. R. Rajam Aiyar, published in 1893-1895 and published in book form in 1896. It was translated into English by Stuart Blackburn and published by Oxford University Press.

== Background ==
Aiyar was born in Vatalakundu, Tamil Nadu, a place near Madurai, and later moved to Madras (now Chennai). Aiyar began writing the novel at age 21. Vivekacintamani ran the novel in its publication from 1893 to 1895, and the book form was published in 1896. Aiyar died in 1898.

Blackburn was of the School of Oriental and African Studies, University of London.

== Plot ==
The main character, Muttuswami Aiyar, resident in Sirukalam, fights against rumours planted against him by some area women, including Ponammal, his sister-in-law. Gargi Bhattacharjee of The Telegraph describes Muttuswami as "rich, virtuous and god fearing".

Blackburn's translation does not include a chapter in which Muttuswami has visions of a spiritual nature; Bhattacharjee stated that the content was "not essential to the development of the story."

Bhattacharjee states that "The plot is fairly unremarkable."

== Reception ==
The Blackburn translation won the 2000 A.K. Ramanujan Book Prize for Translation.

Geeta Dharmarajan of India Today praised the Blackburn translation, stating that the "humour and sarcasm" makes it "a must-read for me". Bhattacharjee criticised the translation having too much influence from English over the Tamil culture into the translation, "Hindiisation", and Blackburn "trying hard (a little too hard maybe) to replace the original puns and idioms with English equivalents."

Bhattacharjee also lauded the translation of the novel, stating that in the late 1990s publishers looking for novels from India "seem interested only in English novels of unproven literary merit". Bhattacharjee stated that the translation did not properly address the original's use of language to differentiate characters and to indicate good and bad characters.
