= B. R. Rajam Iyer =

Lawyer and writer (1872–1898)

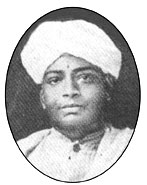
- Born: 1872
- Died: 1898 (aged 25–26)
- Occupations: Lawyer, writer
- Notable work: Kamalambal Saritharam

B. R. Rajam Iyer (or Aiyar; 1872–1898) was an Indian lawyer and writer who wrote in Tamil and English. He is the author of Kamalambal Saritharam, an early Tamil novel.

Iyer was deeply interested in religion and philosophy and edited an English magazine, Prabuddha Bharata, from 1896. The magazine was started at the behest of Swami Vivekananda. He authored Kamalambal Saritharam between 1893 and 1895. Kamalambal is one of the earliest Tamil novels written after Prathapa Mudaliar Charithram.

== Works ==
- "Rambles in Vedanta"
- Aabattukkitamaana Apavaatam allatu Kamalaambaal Charittiram (The Fatal Rumour)
