= Swarupananda =

Indian religious leader (1871–1906)

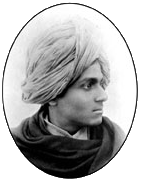
- Born: Ajay Hari Bannerjee; 8 July 1871 Bhawanipore, Calcutta, British India
- Died: 27 June 1906 (aged 34); Nainital, British India
- Occupations: Monk, editor of Prabuddha Bharata
- Known for: Vedanta

Swarupananda (8 July 1871 – 27 June 1906) was a direct monastic disciple of Vivekananda and the first president of the Advaita Ashrama, set up by Vivekananda in 1899 at Mayavati, near Champawat. The ashram is a branch of the religious monastic order, Ramakrishna Math, also set up by Vivekananda on the teachings of his guru Ramakrishna.

Swarupananda remained as editor of Prabuddha Bharata, an English-language monthly journal of the Ramakrishna Order, when it shifted base from Chennai in 1898 and remained so till 1906.

Vivekananda exclaimed to Sara Bull and other friends about the young disciple whom he had initiated into the monastic order, "we have made an acquisition today."

== Pre Monastic life ==
Swarupananda's pre monastic name was Ajay Hari Bannerjee. He was born on 8 July 1871 at Bhawanipur in Calcutta, in a well-to-do Brahmin family. Early experiences with sorrows and tribulations in life and human misery inspired him to develop a spiritual outlook. He developed friendship with Satishchandra Mukherjee, who was in his later years a patriot and a scholar, and together started a school for imparting knowledge of Indian scriptures and Sanskrit education. The aim of the school was spread noble ideas among student community. They also started a monthly magazine, named as Dawn and Ajay became its first editor. In 1897 Ajay inspired his friend Satishchandra to start the Dawn Society. The journal Dawn had made a lot of contribution to national education and to the freedom movement. Till Ajay Hari embraced monastic life, he and Satishchandra acted as joint editors.

== Meeting with Vivekananda ==
Ajay first met Vivekananda after the latter's return to India, in April–May 1897, in Nilambar Mukherjee's Garden House in Belur. He met the Swami several times, before the latter initiated him into the monastic order. According to Swami Swarupananda's diary, he was initiated into the vow of renunciation on 29 March 1898, Tuesday.

== Advaita Ashrama and Prabuddha Bharata: Contributions ==
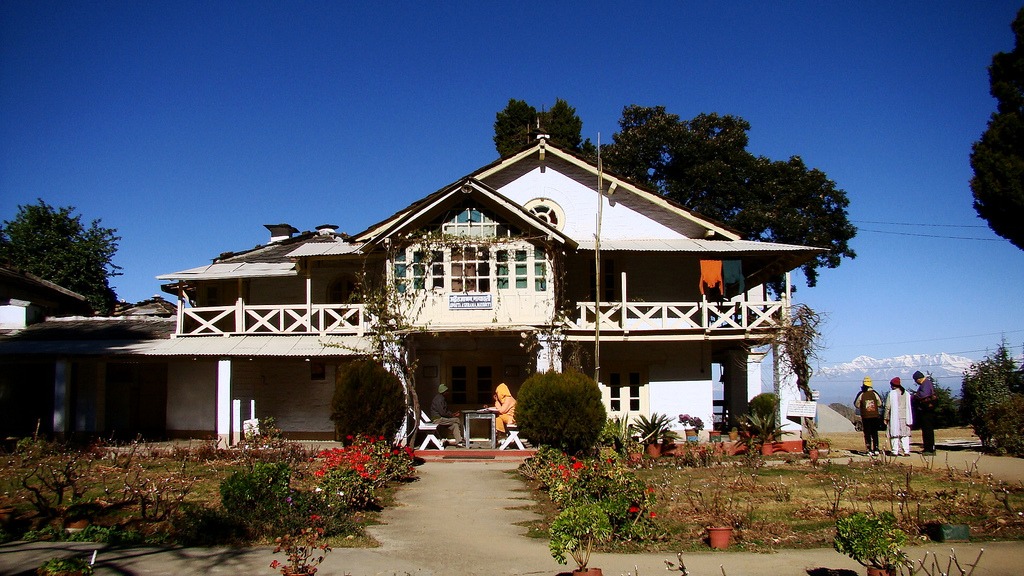
Advaita Ashrama, Mayavati

Swarupananda was married early in his youth, but continued to live as a Brahmachari or celibate at his parents' home in Calcutta. After three or four visits to the Belur Math, he decided to leave home and become a full-time disciple of Vivekananda, and within a few days of his stay at the Math, he was initiated into the monastic order, (sanyas), by Vivekananda on 29 March 1898.

Meanwhile, John Henry Sevier who had earlier come in contact with Vivekananda during his visit to London and become his disciple, travelled to India with Vivekananda, along with his wife Charlotte. Sevier, with the help of Swarupananda, found an old tea estate suitable for the Ashram, at Mayavati, near Almora in July 1898. Soon the land was purchased and construction commenced. The Advaita Ashrama had its formal opening on 19 March 1899, which happened to be the birth anniversary of Ramakrishna (Hindu calendar), that year, with Swarupananda its first head upon its opening.

Sister Nivedita had become a monastic disciple of Vivekananda when she took sanyas four days prior to Swarupananda at Belur, in March–April 1898. Swarupananda taught her Bengali and Hindu religious literature every day. Later at Almora under his guidance she started reading the Bhagavad Gita.

The publication of Prabuddha Bharata, the Official Journal of the Ramakrishna Order was halted abruptly due to the death of its editor B. R. Rajam Iyer, who was only twenty-four years old, on 13 May 1898 in Chennai. Vivekananda, who was then resting at Almora, asked Sevier and his wife to revive the magazine. The next issue of the magazine was published from Thompson house in Almora town in August 1898 with Swarupananda as its editor, then in 1899 it shifted base with the opening of the ashram in a secluded hilly region in Mayavati, near Almora.

During his editorship, Prabuddha Bharata became a powerful medium for disseminating ideals of Ramakrishna and Vivekananda and earned much appreciation from the intellectuals. Vivekananda had also praised Swarupananda's work in one of his letters.

Swarupananda became the president of the Mayavati ashrama. He was very close to Captain and Mrs. Sevier. The most memorable event during his tenure was the visit of Vivekananda to Mayavati in January 1901, after his return from his second visit to the West. He discussed about his ideas of the work to be carried out from the Ashrama with Swarupananda.

Swarupananda was keen to work for the upliftment of the tribal and the poor people in the region. He initiated education of hill people in modern methods of cultivation to address their acute poverty and shortage of food. He established two schools, one in Mayavati and the other in the village of Shore for the local children. He also started a charitable dispensary which even today serves the people of the region. He also arranged to teach Hindi and English to the tribal employees of the Ashrama. He would travel to Nainital, Almora and other places to spread both secular and spiritual knowledge among local people.

In 1899, he worked to provide relief to the local people who were affected by a terrible famine in the Kishangarh area, near Jaipur. There he worked with Swami Kalyanananda, his brother disciple. He also begged from door to door in Nainital for Swami Kalyanananda to enable him to serve the old and sick monks and poor people in Haridwar and Rishikesh. In 1902, he went to Allahabad for giving lectures on Vedanta and inspired the local people to start a permanent centre there. In 1905 when the Dharmashala region was hit by a severe earthquake, Swarupananda collected funds for the relief work and directed the work.

He was regular in his spiritual practices and austerities, apart from the various secular activities that kept him engaged. He built a hut near the ashrama which came to be known as Swarupananda hut, for the purpose of meditating in seclusion. He worked among youth and students to spread the message of Vivekananda. He was also invited by His Highness of Baroda to preach Vedanta, together with Swami Vivekananda. But Vivekananda could not come owing to his ill health. Another important project in which Swarupananda worked was collection and publication of Swami Vivekananda's works, but he could not finish it owing to his short lifespan. As a distinguished scholar he wrote several articles in Prabuddha Bharata and strongly rebutted the criticisms of a certain Professor Fraser on Vivekananda in Hindustan Review magazine. He authored the translation of Bhagavad Gita in English.

== Last days ==
The location of Mayavati however didn't suit Swarupananda well, as the constant uphill and downhill of Mayavati terrain, took a toll on his heart. In November 1901 he was recuperating in Calcutta with Vivekananda; while he continued to edit the magazine and run the ashram for another six years until his 1906 death in Nainital. He suffered from pneumonia after being drenched by rain while travelling to Nainital and died on 27 June 1906. His obituary in Prabuddha Bharata was written by Sister Nivedita.

== Literary works ==
- Srimad-Bhagavad-Gita. Advaita Ashrama. 1909. ISBN 81-7505-096-9.
