= Bhuteshananda =

Swami Bhuteshananda
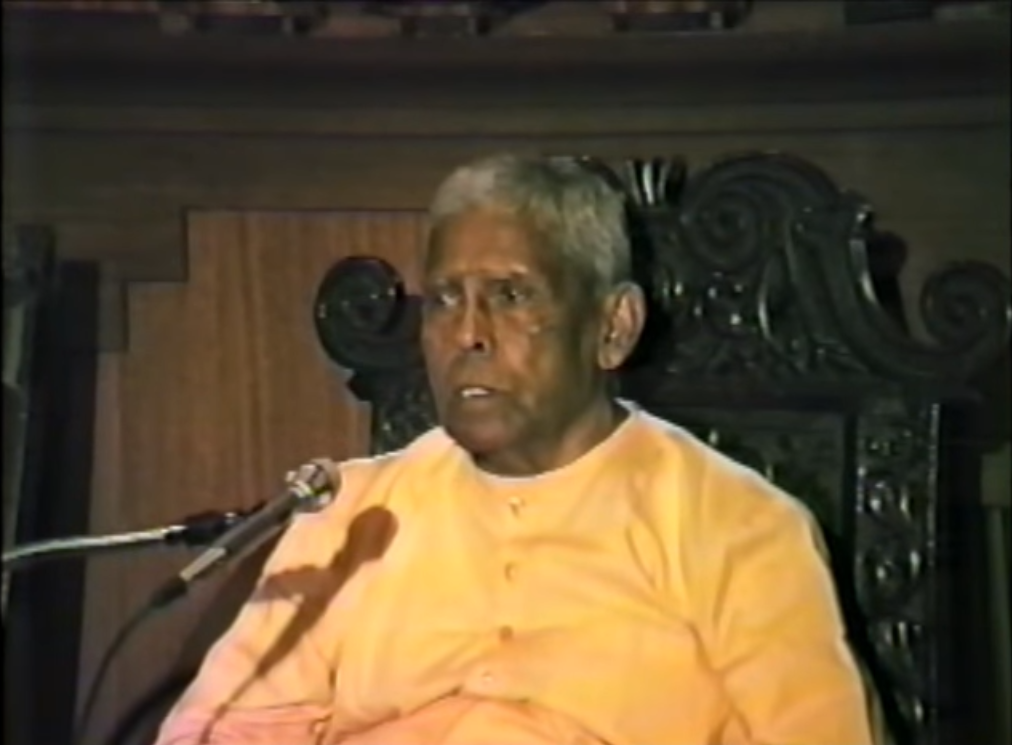
- Swami Bhuteshananda

Personal life
- Born: Vijay Chandra Roy (Pre-Monastic name); 8 September 1901 Somsar, Bengal Presidency, British India
- Died: 10 August 1998 (aged 96) Calcutta, West Bengal, India
- Main interest: Vedanta- Advaita Vedanta
- Occupation: Monk at Ramakrishna Mission; 12th President of the Ramakrishna Order (1989-1998)

Religious life
- Religion: Hinduism
- Philosophy: Advaita Vedanta

Religious career
- Teacher: Swami Saradananda
- Predecessor: Swami Gambhirananda
- Successor: Swami Ranganathananda
- Disciples: Swami Sarvapriyananda and others

Swami Bhuteshananda (8 September 1901 -10 August 1998) was a Hindu monk and the 12th President of the Ramakrishna Order (1989-1998).

== Early life ==
He was born on 8 September 1901 at Somsar (an interior village) in Bengal Presidency. His premonastic name was Vijay Chandra. His father was Purna Chandra Roy, and his mother was Charubala Devi. In his student life, he met Jnan Maharaj (a direct disciple of Swami Vivekananda). Under the influence of his and some other spiritual young boys, he started to go to Belur Math frequently, and he met many of the direct disciples of Sri Ramakrishna. He graduated from Government Sanskrit College (Kolkata, then Calcutta) where he mastered Bengali, English and Sanskrit. Due to his visits to the Math, one day he went to the Math to become Monk (Sannyasi), but as his studies were not completed, he was asked to come later. This made him leave his residence, and he built a Shiva temple in Baghbazar (Calcutta) and lived there like a renunciate monk, practising intense Tapasya. He was present during the funeral of Sri Sarada Devi in December 1920.

== Life as a monk ==
In 1921, Saradananda (direct disciple of Sri Ramakrishna) initiated Vijay with Mantradiksha at the Mother's house. He was bestowed with the vows of Brahmacharya by Shivananda in 1923 on Holy mother's birthday, and was named 'Priya Chaitanya'. He took Sannyasa from Swami Shivananda (another direct disciple of Sri Ramakrishna). Swami Gambhirananda was also initiated into Brahmacharya in 1923 and into Sannyasa in 1928 by Swami Shivananda. After he became a monk, he went to Uttarkashi (Himalayas) and lived in the Himalayas for 2–3 years like a traditional monk, wandering without any fixed residence, practising Tapasya (Spiritual Austerities) and living by Bhiksha (Begging food). After return he went to Dhaka Center (of Ramakrishna Order) till 1932.

In 1936, he was appointed the president of the Ramakrishna Math, Shillong. In 1945, he was appointed as the president of Rajkot Math. There he translated Ramakrishna-Vivekananda-Vedanta literature into Gujarati, and served in the relief operations organized by the Order in the flooded areas of West Bengal in 1926, as the Camp-in-charge of the Burma Evacuee Relief in 1942 and many others. In 1965, Bhuteshanandaji was appointed as one of the Trustees and a Member of the Governing body of Ramakrishna Mission. In 1975, Bhuteshanandaji became one of the vice-presidents of the Order and moved over to Kankurgachi Yogodyan, a suburb of Kolkata. Following the death of Gambhirananda (27 December 1988), the 11th president of the Order, in 1989 (24 January), he became the 12th president. From 1975 to 1998, he initiated many. he never wrote any books, but his explanation and classes on spiritual texts like the Upanishads, Sri Sri Ramakrishna Kathamrita (English: The Gospel of Sri Ramakrishna), Bhagavatam, etc. have been recorded by others who were present there. Some books have been published from his lectures and class talks, of which Sri Ramakrishna Kathamrita Prasanga (in six vols.), Mundakopanishad, Kathopanishad, Upanishad O Ajker Manush, Sharanagati (all in Bengali) and Thoughts on Spiritual Life (in English).

During twenty-three years as vice president and President of the Order he travelled to many countries including Singapore, Fiji, Japan, Australia, America, Canada, England, France, Bangladesh and Sri Lanka, and carried the ideals and ideas of Ramakrishna-Mother-Vivekananda to innumerable people. He had a special fascination for Vedānta- Advaita Vedānta.

He died on 10 August 1998. On 18 December 2015, a new temple and monastery were inaugurated at Somsar, his ancestral village in Bankura district.

== Bibliography ==
- Uniqueness of the Ramakrishna Incarnation and Other Essays, by Swami Bhuteshananda. Advaita Ashrama. 2018. ISBN 9788175054745.
- Sri Ramakrishna and His Gospel (3 Vols. Set), by Swami Bhuteshananda. Advaita Ashrama. 2019.
- Sri Ramakrishna Vachanamrit Prasang (Hindi set of 4 vols), by Swami Bhuteshananda. Ramakrishna Math, Nagpur.
- Narada Bhakti Sutras by Swami Bhuteshananda. Advaita Ashrama. ISBN 9788175051997.
- Ishwar Prapti Ke Upay (Hindi) by Swami Bhuteshananda. Ramakrishna Math, Nagpur.
- Mantra Diksha (Bengali) by Swami Bhuteshananda. Udbodhan Karyalaya, Kolkata. ISBN 9788180402746.
