= Vivekananda Balaka Sangha =

School in Bangalore, India

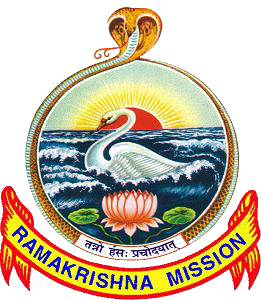

Location
- Bangalore, India; Karnataka

Information
- Motto: Atmano mokshartham jagat hitaya cha (आत्मनो मोक्षार्थं जगद्धिताय च) (For one’s own salvation and for the welfare of the world)
- Oversight: Ramakrishna Mission
- Website: rkmkmpskamarpukur.org

Vivekananda Balaka Sangha is an institution opened in April 1953 for the education of poor boys. It was established by Swami Yatiswarananda in Bangalore, India.

== History ==
Yatiswarananda, president of Ramakarishna Math school in Bangalore, was inspired by Sunday schools he saw in the United States. He was impressed at how they promoted the moral and ethical development of children in conjunction with their regular education. When he returned to India, Yatiswarananda planned a similar venture for the spiritual and moral growth of children, in line with the vision of Swami Vivekananda. The result was Vivekananda Balaka Sangha. Swami Sastrananda who was a disciple of Swami Yatiswarananda as well as his private secretary, took charge as mentor of the students admitted in the Sangha. The institution's first students were local school children.

== Current state ==
Balaka Sangha is currently part of Ramakrishna Math school, and functions as a cultural organisation for boys older than 9. Students are taught Vedic chanting and Bhajan chanting, and are exposed to the cultural and religious heritage of India.
