= Sri Ramakrishna Vijayam =

Sri Ramakrishna Vijayam

Sri Ramakrishna Vijayam is a Tamil language spiritual magazine published by Sri Ramakrishna Math, Chennai. The magazine has been published monthly since 1921.

This magazine is considered to be an ancient leading spiritual and cultural magazine in Tamil Nadu.

== National Youth Day competition ==
As part of Swami Vivekananda birthday celebrations, Sri Ramakrishna Vijayam magazine organizes National Youth Day competition for the past 11 years for the students. In this competitions more than 10 lakh Students participated from nearly 3000 institutions last year and more than 12 lakh Students participated in the year 2014.

== Short Story Competitions ==
Sri Ramakrishna Vijayam conducts short story competition from the year 2014 onwards to encourage the writers.

=== Short Story Competition 2015 ===
For the year 2015, the short story competition has been announced and the last date to submit the Tamil short stories was declared to be 25 July 2015.

=== Short Story Competition 2014 ===
In a short story competition conducted by this magazine nearly 1000 stories were submitted. The prizes were distributed on 29 August 2014.

== See also ==
- List of magazines by Ramakrishna Mission
