= Somsar =

- Village
- Location within West Bengal Location within India
- Country: India
- State: West Bengal
- District: Bankura
- Time zone: UTC+5.30 (IST)
- PIN: 713412
- Website: https://bankura.gov.in/

Somsar is a small village located on the bank of the river Damodar in the Bankura District. As per the Census of 2011, Somsar has a population of 4421 people of which 2136 are females and 2285 are males. The literacy rate of Somsar is 63.12% which is significantly lower than the state level literacy rate that stands at 76.26% and there are 957 households there. It is surrounded by villages like Palash Danga and Bhagitpur.

The name of the village has its origin from the village deity – Someshwar. Someshwar is still now being worshipped in an ancient Shiva temple by the people of Somsar. The village has rich natural surroundings and is considered as an ideal picnic place by the people of West Bengal.

Somsar Sri Ramakrishna Seva Mandir is one of the few prominent places to visit in Somsar. Swami Bhuteshananda- the 12th President of the Ramakrishna Mission was born in this village in 1901.
