= S. Parthasarathy Aiyangar =

Vaishnava scholar

S. Parthasarathy Aiyangar (born 1840) was a Vaishanava scholar and author.

== Early life ==
He was born to Kundalam Srirangapatnam Krishnamacharya and Vedamma in 1840. He was among the first batch of students to graduate from Madras University in 1859, and was one of the first to graduate from the Madras Law College in 1862.

S. Parthasarathy was appointed as Secretary to Saraswathi Bhandaram Committee, which was involved in collecting manuscripts of works on Vishishtadvaita and publishing them. He was also involved in the Vivekananda's Chicago visit.

He was one of the founding members of Sri Vedha Vedhantha Vardhini.

In his last years he built a Ram temple in Ayodhya and settled there.

== Bibliography ==
- Lokacharya, Pillai; Aiyangar, Parthasarathy (1900). "Bow to the blest Ramanuja, Tattva-Traya : or aphorisms on the three verities, soul, matter and God". Sreshtalur Viraraghava Chariar, Madras.
