= Junglezen Sheru =

Indian books about Hinduism

- Author: Swami Samarpanananda
- Language: English
- Genre: Fiction, spirituality
- Publication date: March 20, 2014
- Publication place: India
- Pages: 176
- ISBN: 978-9-382-61628-3

The book Junglezen Sheru, written by Swami Samarpanananda, tells the story of an orphan lion cub who, until the very end, refuses to accept that he is a lion. The narrative explores the cub's physical, mental, and emotional growth.

The book is used in management seminars at IIMA and discussed in spirituality forums.

It is a layered story with various implications. Each chapter of the book is preceded by teachings from the Bible, Acharya Shankara, the Kathopanishad, Swami Vivekananda, and the Chhandogya Upanishad. These teachings present three messages for mankind.

1. Tat Tvam Asi which means 'You are that supreme reality'. Muktak, the elephant is the mentor of Sheru, who gives the lion cub, this message throughout the story . Shuka, the empty headed parrot, shouts this message out, but Sheru continues to ignore it.
2. Strength, humility, individuality, leadership and perfection can be attained only when one has faith in oneself.
3. The story describes Ethology and its similarity to our human world.

== Major characters ==
- Sheru - the lion, young, gullible and the only survivor of the royal family. Sheru lost his family, in the hands of poachers. As Sheru, starts to learn the ways of forest life, he believes in every animal whom he meets. But the forest being without a king, most of the animals turn hungry for power, making the forest scenario turn political. The fight for power becomes so intense that Sheru is made to suffer by working on a lettuce firm.
- Muktak - The wise elephant, who constantly tries to convince Sheru that he is the rightful and worthy ruler of the forest.But Sheru ignores his words.
- Kapi - A monkey and the newly elected leader of the forest who introduces the concept of right to equality in the forest, and coins the term" Junglezen ", only to keep his own position as a ruler, secure.But in times of crisis, Kapi shows what a coward he is.
- Kurma - The wise and sagely tortoise, who visits the forest, once in a while, to give knowledge to the worthy.
