= Charlotte Sevier =

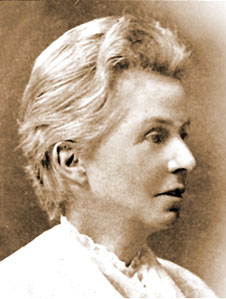
- Mrs. Charlotte Sevier, a disciple of Swami Vivekananda
- Born: 1847; England, United Kingdom
- Died: 20 October 1930 (aged 82–83)
- Occupation: Disciple of Swami Vivekananda
- Spouse: James Henry Sevier

Charlotte Sevier (1847 – 20 October 1930), also known as Mrs Sevier, was a direct disciple of Swami Vivekananda and was British in origin. She, together with her husband James Henry Sevier established the Advaita Ashrama, a branch of the Ramakrishna Order, in Mayavati in the Himalayas.

== Meeting Swami Vivekananda ==
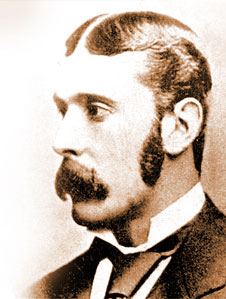
Captain James Henry Sevier, a disciple of Swami Vivekananda

James Henry Sevier was a non-commissioned officer in the British army. Both he and his wife Charlotte Elizabeth Sevier had been seekers of spiritual knowledge. In the course of his second visit to London, Swami Vivekananda delivered several lectures and also participated in private parlors. The Sevier couple had attended the lectures and was attracted by the philosophy, esp. his dissertations on Advaita Vedanta, the non-dual aspects of Vedanta of Sankaracharya. The very first time they met the Swami in private, the latter addressed Mrs. Sevier as "mother" and appealed to her to come to India, where he promised that he would give them the best of his realisations. The husband and wife both decided to become disciples of Swami Vivekananda and follow him to India. In 1896, the Seviers accompanied Swami Vivekananda to his travels in the continent of Europe, through Switzerland, Italy and Germany, esp. in the Alps. Seviers had arranged for the trip in order to enable the Swami to take some rest. In the Alps, Swami Vivekananda had expressed his desire to have a monastery in the Himalayas, an ideal which became a mission with the Seviers. The Seviers accompanied the Swami when the latter returned to India, after selling all their properties in England. They stayed in Almora in the Himalayas. Swami Vivekananda visited Mayavati on hearing the news of the demise of Captain Sevier from 3 to 18 January 1901.

== Advaita Ashrama, Mayavati ==
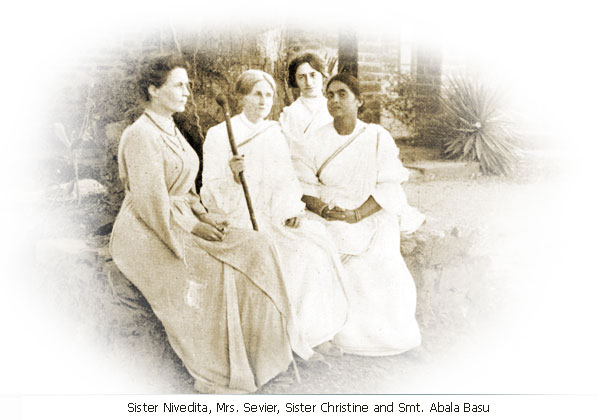
Sister Nivedita, Sister Christine, Mrs. Sevier and Lady Abala Bose in Mayavati

In 1898, The Prabuddha Bharata or Awakened India magazine, which was published by the madras disciples at the behest of Swami Vivekananda, faced a crisis. Swami Vivekananda then entrusted the Seviers to look after the publication of this magazine, and he provided his disciple Swami Swarupananda to be the editor. Along with Swami Swarupananda, the Seviers made a tour of the Almora district and came across the estate of Mayavati at an elevation of 6000 to 7000 ft with its enchanting views of the Himalayan hills and valleys. There the Seviers established the Advaita Ashrama, the first monastic branch of the Ramakrishna Order in the Himalayas, dedicated to the contemplation of THE ONENESS OF ALL BEINGS. After establishing the monastery, from where they started publishing the magazine again, the Seviers led an austere life together with four monks. Captain Sevier died on 28 October 1900 after suffering from urinary infection. Mrs. Sevier continued to live in Mayavati Ashrama. Many eminent persons visited the Advaita Ashrama. The list included Sister Nivedita, Sister Christine, Sir Jagadish Chandra Bose and his wife Lady Abala Bose, Chittaranjan Das, Nandalal Bose, Gertrude Emerson Sen, Josephine MacLeod, and Marie Louise Burke among others.

== Contributions ==
Apart from establishing the Advaita Ashrama, Mrs. Sevier also looked after the day-to-day running. She also assisted in the editing of the Prabuddha Bharat magazine and contributed towards compilation and editing of the Life of Swami Vivekananda by Eastern and Western Disciples. She also contributed in compiling the Complete Works of Swami Vivekananda.

Mrs. Sevier also purchased land for Vivekananda Ashrama at Shyamla Tal.

She contributed towards the "Vivekananda Memorial Temple Fund" to build a temple at the site of Swami Vivekananda's cremation.

== External ==
- Mother of Mayavati: The Story of Charlotte Sevier and Advaita Ashrama, By Amrita M. Salm, Advaita Ashrama, Mayavati, 2013
