= Vedanta Society of New York =

Hindu society

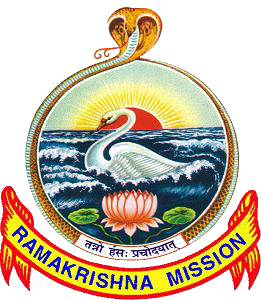
- Emblem

- Location within Manhattan

General information
- Status: Active
- Type: Heritage place, religious organization
- Location: 34 West 71st Street, New York, United States
- Coordinates: 40°46′33.6″N 73°58′40.8″W
- Inaugurated: November 1894
- Owner: Ramakrishna Mission

Website
- vedantany.org

Vedanta Society of New York (VSNY) was the first Vedanta Society founded by the Indian Hindu monk Swami Vivekananda in New York in November 1894. In 1897, Swami Abhedananda, another disciple of Ramakrishna, came to the United States and took charge of the society. He was the president of the society until 1921. The Vedanta Society is affiliated with the Ramakrishna Math religious monastic order and the Ramakrishna Mission.

== History ==
=== Establishment ===
In 1893, Vivekananda went to the United States and joined the Parliament of the World's Religions held in Chicago. He was a delegate representing Hinduism and India. After the conclusion of the Parliament, he traveled to many American cities including Minneapolis, Memphis, Detroit and New York. Almost everywhere he went he received a cordial welcome. On 16 May 1894, he delivered a lecture at Harvard University. In November 1894, Vivekananda established the first Vedanta Society in two rented rooms at 54 West 33rd Street in Manhattan, New York City.

=== 1894–1921 ===
Vivekananda traveled to many other places in the United States and England and returned to India in 1897. Abhedananda, another direct disciple of Ramakrishna, went to the United States in the same year and took charge of the society. He was its president until 1921, when he returned to India. As president, Abhedananda helped structure the society and had it incorporated under New York law.

=== 1921–present ===
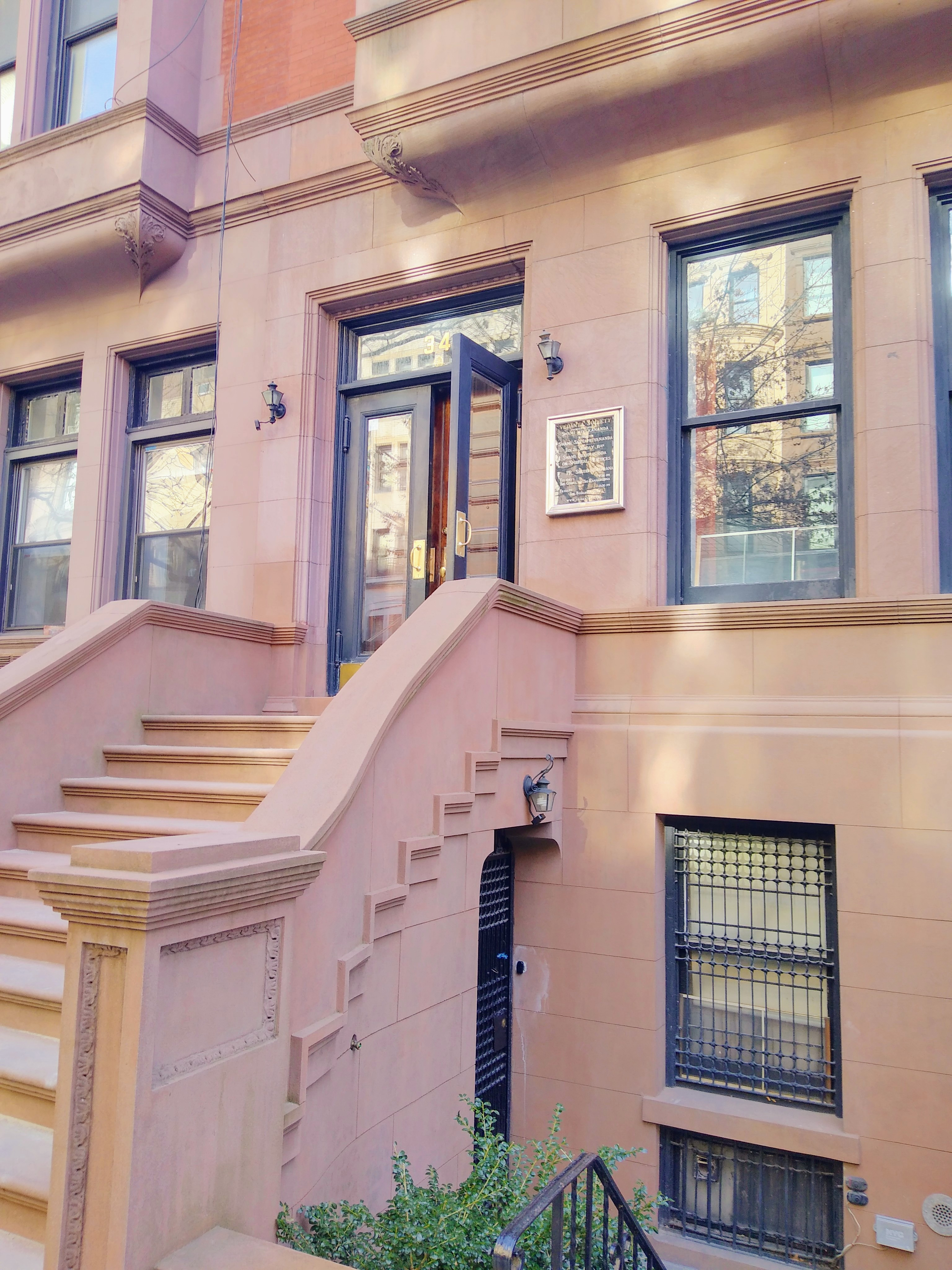

The society initially operated out of a rented house and was relocated several times. In 1921, the society established settled headquarters at 34 West 71st Street, which remains its address.

The society has had six presidents since inception. Swami Tathagatananda was the president since 1977 until his death on 25 June 2016. Swami Sarvapriyananda was appointed as Minister and Spiritual Leader of the Vedanta Society of New York, and assumed his duties on January 6, 2017.

== Activities ==
The society is affiliated with the Ramakrishna Math religious monastic order and Ramakrishna Mission, and houses a library, bookstore and prayer hall. They conduct weekly lecture classes on The Gospel of Sri Ramakrishna. Seminars and conventions are also regularly organized.
