= Swami Tathagatananda =

Hindu monk (1923–2016)

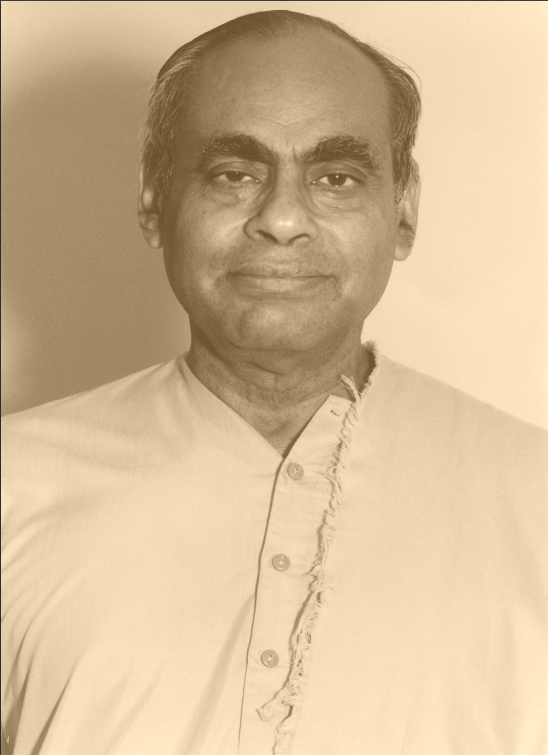

Personal life
- Born: Laxminarayan Bhattacharya; 15 February 1923 West Bengal, India
- Died: 25 June 2016 (aged 93)
- Honors: Minister and Spiritual Leader of The Vedanta Society of New York from November 1977 to June 2016

Religious life
- Religion: Hinduism
- Order: Ramakrishna Math and Ramakrishna Mission
- Philosophy: Advaita Vedanta

Religious career
- Teacher: Swami Virajananda

Swami Tathagatananda (15 February 1923 – 25 June 2016), was a Hindu monk of the Ramakrishna Math and Ramakrishna Mission. He was the Minister and Spiritual Leader of the Vedanta Society of New York from November 1977 to June 2016, which was the first Vedanta Society in the United States, founded by Swami Vivekananda in 1895.

Born as Laxminarayan Bhattacharya in West Bengal, India, he was initiated in 1945 into the spiritual order by Swami Virajananda, a disciple of Sarada Devi and secretary of Swami Vivekananda. He officially joined the Ramakrishna Order as a brahmachari (trainee-student monk) in 1955. He had his sannyasa diksha (bestowal of full monkhood following the Hindu Advaita-Vedanta tradition) from Swami Madhavananda in 1965.

Tathagatananda served as the Assistant Minister of the Vedanta Society of New York from February 1977 under Swami Pavitrananda. He became the Minister of the Vedanta Society of New York in November 1977 after the sudden passing away of Swami Pavitrananda on 18 November 1977.

Before going to the United States, as an assistant, Tathagatananda worked at Saradapitha, Deoghar Vidyapith, Chennai Students’ Home. He was the head of Baranagore Mission Ashrama during the year 1975.

== Works ==
Tathagatananda has written, translated, and edited books in English and Bengali.

=== Books in English ===
- Alasinga Perumal : A Rare Disciple of Swami Vivekananda
- Albert Einstein : His Human Side
- Basic Ideas of Hinduism and How it is Transmitted
- Celebrating Shri Ramakrishna : 175th Birth Anniversary
- Celebrating Swami Vivekananda : Essays for the 150th Birth Anniversary
- Glimpses of Great Lives
- Healthy Values of Living
- Journey of the Upanishads to the West
- Light from the Orient : Essays on the Impact of India's Literature in the West
- Meditation on Shri Ramakrishna and Swami Vivekananda
- Meditation on Swami Vivekananda
- Relief of Tension, Depression and Anxiety through Spiritual Living (also available in Spanish)
- Some Inspiring Illustrations of Shri Ramakrishna, Holy Mother and Swamiji and Their Love
- The Vedanta Society of New York : A Brief Survey

=== Books in Bengali ===
- Albert Einstein o tar Manabik Satta
- Mahabharat Katha
- Mahat Jivane Param Satyer Abhasita Alo
- Prachyer Alo
- Ramayan Katha
- Shubho Chinta
- Tridhara
