= Prabuddha Bharata =

Prabuddha Bharata Or Awakened India
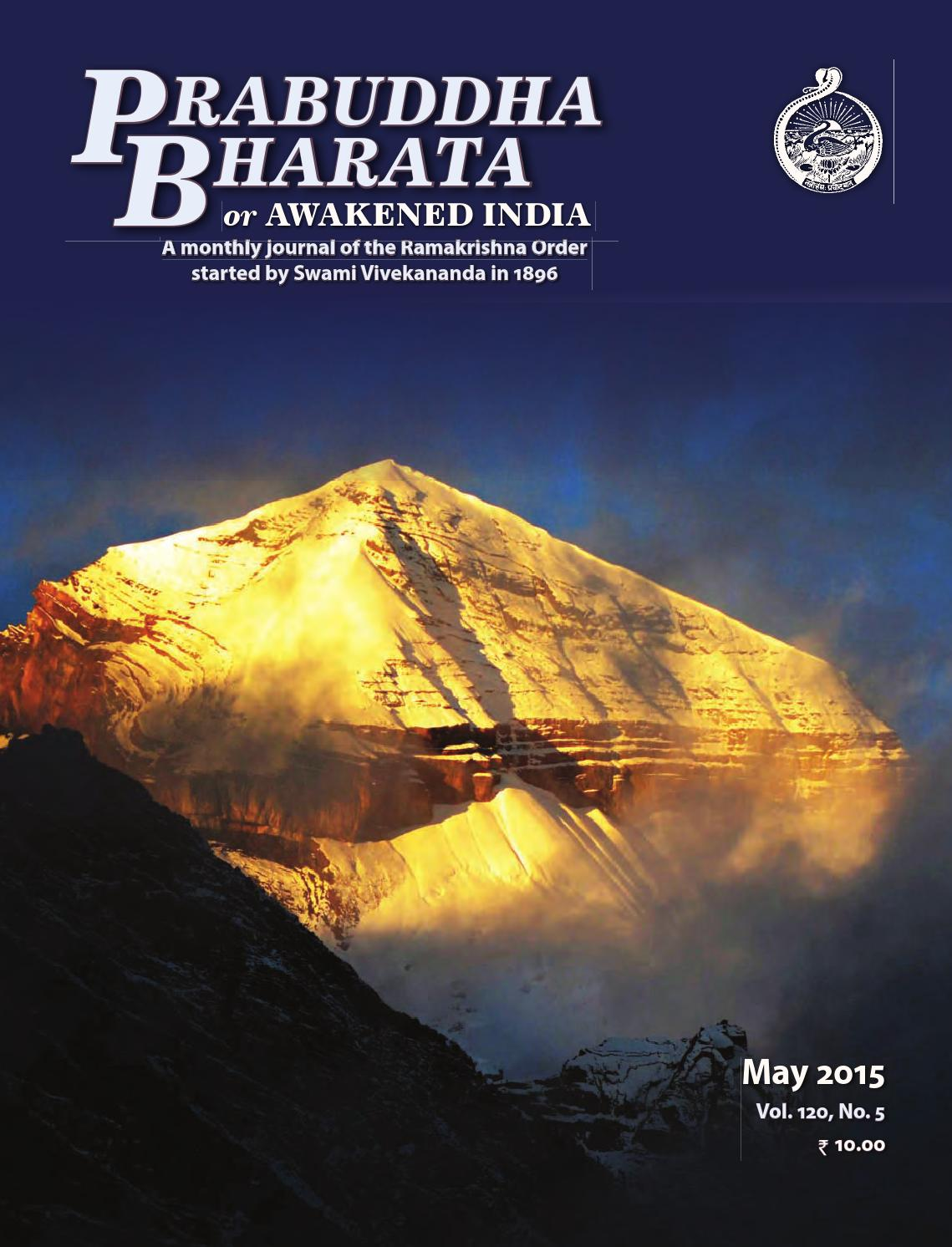
- Discipline: Humanities, Social Sciences, Indian Studies, Vedanta, Spirituality, Religion, Culture
- Language: English
- Edited by: Swami Divyakripananda

Publication details
- History: July 1896 – present
- Publisher: Advaita Ashrama (India)
- Frequency: Monthly

Standard abbreviations
- ISO 4: Prabuddha Bharata

Indexing
- ISSN: 0032-6178
- LCCN: ca30000793
- OCLC no.: 781901638

Links
- Journal homepage; Online access; Online archive; Archives 1896-2001

Prabuddha Bharata Or Awakened India is an English-language monthly journal of the Ramakrishna Order, in publication since July 1896. It carries articles and translations by monks, scholars, and other writers on humanities and social sciences, including religious, psychological, historical, and cultural themes. It has a section of book reviews where important publications from university presses from around the world are reviewed. It is edited from Advaita Ashrama, Mayavati, Uttarakhand, and published and printed in Kolkata. Prabuddha Bharata is India's longest running English journal.

== History ==
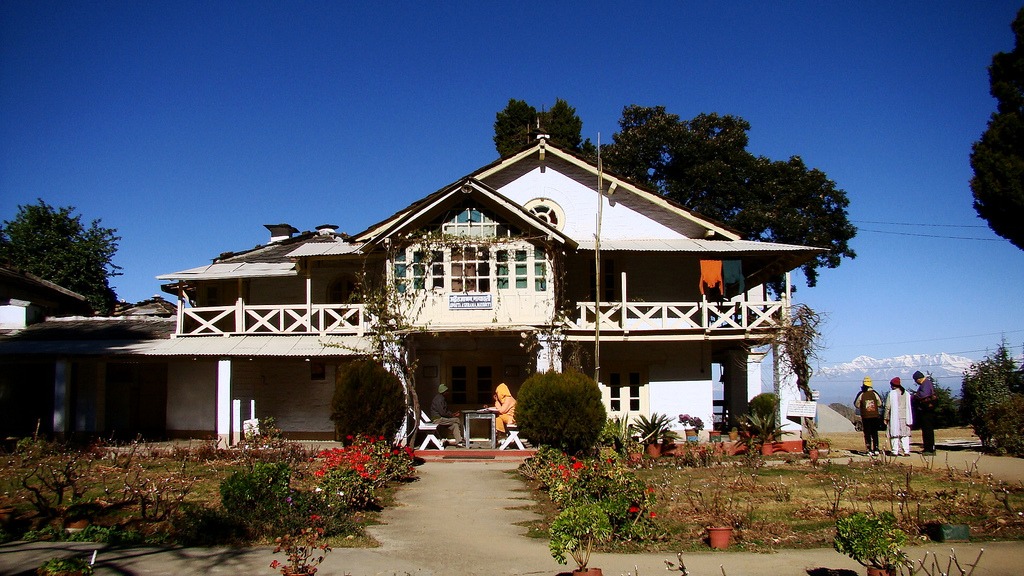
Advaita Ashrama, Mayavati, a branch of the Ramakrishna Math, where 'Prabuddha Bharata's publication moved in 1899, with Swami Swarupananda as its editor

Prabuddha Bharata was founded in 1896 by P. Aiyasami, B. R. Rajam Iyer, G. G. Narasimhacharya, and B. V. Kamesvara Iyer, in Madras (now Chennai), at the behest of Swami Vivekananda, with whom the founders had been closely associated before the swami went to America in 1893. The swami suggested the journal's name, and gave encouragement to the founders through his letters to them. The editor, B. R. Rajam Iyer, was only twenty-four years old. The journal saw two full years of publication from Madras, from July 1896 to June 1898. The death of the editor on 13 May 1898 from Bright's disease brought the journal's publication to an unexpected pause, and the July 1898 number could not be published. As Sister Nivedita recalled the period in her memoirs, 22 June – 15 July 1898: "The Swami (Vivekananda) had always had a special love for this paper, as the beautiful name he had given it indicated. He had always been eager too for the establishment of organs of his own. The value of the journal in the education of modern India was perfectly evident to him, and he felt that his master's message and mode of thought required to be spread by this means as well as by preaching and by work."

By that time, Swami Vivekananda had returned to India and was visiting Almora. He asked Captain J. H. Sevier, one of his English disciples who was accompanying him, to take up the management of the journal; Sevier agreed and offered to meet the preliminary costs associated with reviving it, which included purchasing and bringing up a hand-press, types, papers, ink and other materials required for the purpose from Kolkata. The Prabuddha Bharata resumed publication in August 1898 from Almora. Swami Swarupananda, one of Vivekananda's monastic disciples, became the new editor.

Swami Vivekananda wrote a poem titled To The Awakened India addressed to Prabuddha Bharata or Awakened India in August 1898, when the journal was not published for one month owing to the untimely death of its first editor B. R. Rajam Iyer and was transferred from Madras (Chennai) to Almora Himalayas. The press was shifted to the newly founded Advaita Ashrama, Mayavati, in March 1899. Swami Swarupananda died in Nainital in 1906. Swami Virajananda, who in 1938 would become the president of the Ramakrishna Order, succeeded him as editor. Among later editors were Swamis Yatiswarananda (1922–24), Ashokananda (1927–30), Gambhirananda (1942–44), and Vandanananda (1950–54). The printing of the journal was shifted from Mayavati to Calcutta (now Kolkata) in 1924. In 2010, Advaita Ashrama released a DVD archive of the first 114 years of Prabuddha Bharata, covering the years 1896 to 2009. 'Some of the greatest minds of India and the world have spoken their minds through writings on Indian culture, spirituality, philosophy, history and psychology.' 'At one time, Mahatma Gandhi used to eagerly wait for every issue of the Journal.' The 'famous Psychologist Carl Jung's thesis on yoga and meditation was serialised and first published in Prabuddha Bharata.' 'Dr S Radhakrishnan used to read every issue of this Journal with great interest.'

== Policies of the Journal ==
Publishes papers that are vetted by its internal team of referees. The rejection rate is around 80%. Most of the papers published are invited by the editor. Uninvited papers could have a turnaround time of about one year or more.

== Editors of Prabuddha Bharata ==
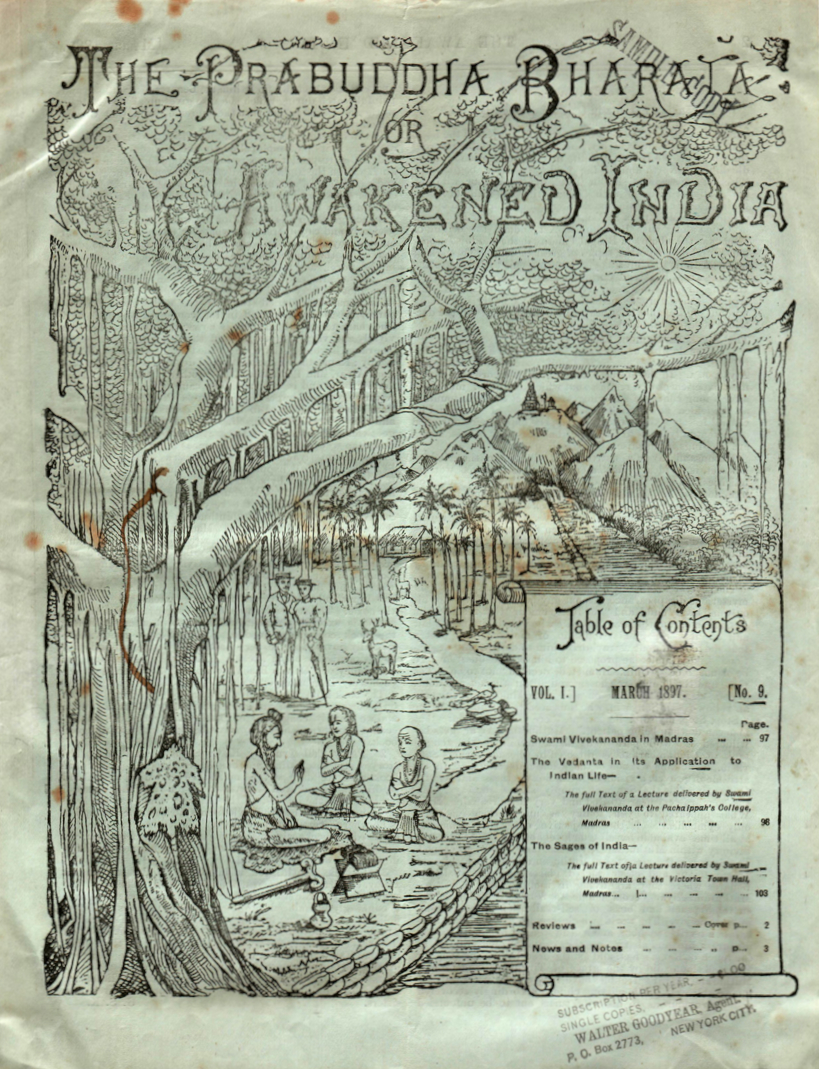
The March 1897 Publication

The journal has assigned different titles to its editor over the course of its history. After being shifted to the Advaita Ashrama, the first three editors were also presidents of the ashrama. Thereafter, the editor and president were different persons. From 1959, the president was also called the editor, and the actual editor called the joint editor. From September 1993, the ashrama president has been called the managing editor, and the editor has again been called the editor.

Editors of Prabuddha Bharata
| × | Period | Editor |
|---|---|---|
| 1 | July 1896 to June 1898 | B. R. Rajam Iyer |
| 2 | August 1898 to July 1906 | Swami Swarupananda |
| 3 | August 1906 to December 1913 | Swami Virajananda |
| 4 | January 1914 to May 1918 | Swami Prajnananda |
| 5 | June 1918 to December 1921 | Swami Raghavananda |
| 6 | January 1922 to December 1924 | Swami Yatiswarananda |
| 7 | January 1925 to December 1926 | Swami Vividishananda |
| 8 | January 1927 to December 1930 | Swami Ashokananda |
| 9 | January 1931 to December 1934 | Swami Pavitrananda |
| 10 | January 1935 to December 1937 | Swami Maithilyananda |
| 11 | January 1938 to December 1939 | Swami Tejasananda |
| 12 | January 1940 to December 1941 | Swami Vipulananda |
| 13 | January 1942 to December 1944 | Swami Gambhirananda |
| 14 | January 1945 to December 1947 | Swami Yogeswarananda |
| 15 | January 1948 to December 1949 | Swami Brahmamayananda |
| 16 | January 1950 to December 1954 | Swami Vandanananda |
| 17 | January 1955 to December 1956 | Swami Satswarupananda |
| 18 | January 1957 to December 1958 | Swami Nihsreyasananda |
| 19 | January 1959 to December 1961 | Swami Ananyananda |
| 20 | January 1962 to December 1963 | Swami Chidatmananda |
| 21 | January 1964 to December 1965 | Swami Kirtidananda |
| 22 | January 1966 to July 1968 | Swami Adiswarananda |
| 23 | August 1968 to December 1968 | Swami Budhananda |
| 24 | January 1969 to December 1970 | Swami Rasajnananda |
| 25 | January 1971 to December 1976 | Swami Tadrupananda |
| 26 | January 1977 to February 1979 | Swami Balaramananda |
| 27 | March 1979 to December 1986 | Swami Bhajanananda |
| 28 | January 1987 to December 1989 | Swami Jitatmananda |
| 29 | January 1990 to December 1993 | Swami Muktirupananda |
| 30 | January 1994 to December 1996 | Swami Atmaramananda |
| 31 | January 1997 to December 1998 | Swami Satyapriyananda |
| 32 | January 1999 to December 2001 | Swami Sunirmalananda |
| 33 | January 2002 to December 2004 | Swami Yuktatmananda |
| 34 | January 2005 to October 2010 | Swami Satyaswarupananda |
| 35 | November 2010 to July 2014 | Swami Satyamayananda |
| 36 | August 2014 to July 2020 | Swami Narasimhananda |
| 37 | August 2020 to January 2024 | Swami Vireshananda |
| 38 | February 2024 to August 2024 | Swami Gunottarananda |
| 39 | September 2024 to Present | Swami Divyakripananda |

== See also ==
- List of Journals by Ramakrishna Mission
- Vedanta Kesari
