= Gambhirananda =

Indian Hindu Sannyasi and writer (1889–1988)

Swami Gambhirananda
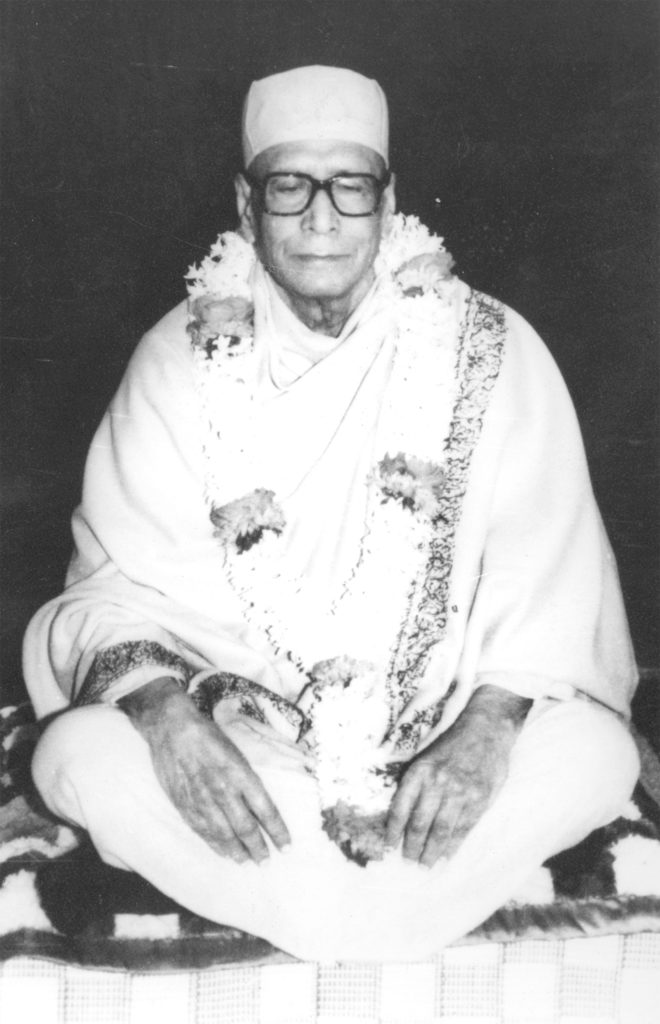

Personal life
- Born: Jatindranath Datta; 11 February 1899 Sadhuhati, Sylhet district, British India
- Died: 27 December 1988 (aged 89) Ramakrishna Mission Seva Pratishthan, Kolkata, West Bengal, India
- Cause of death: Lung-infection and Cardiac Problems.

Religious life
- Religion: Hinduism
- Philosophy: Advaita Vedanta

Religious career
- Teacher: Swami Shivananda
- Predecessor: Swami Vireshwarananda
- Successor: Swami Bhuteshananda

Swami Gambhirananda (1899–1988), born Jatindranath Datta, was a Hindu sanyasi who served as the 11th President of the Ramakrishna Mission.

== Biography ==
He was born at Sadhuhati in today's Bangladesh. He graduated from Scottish Church College, Calcutta (Kolkata).

He joined the Ramakrishna Mission in May, 1923. He was initiated to Sannyasa by Swami Shivananda (a direct disciple of Sri Ramakrishna) in 1928. Due to his excellent work, he was made the Secretary of Ramakrishna Mission Vidyapith, Deoghar in the year 1926 and continued till 1935. From 1953-1963, he served as the President of Advaita Ashrama, Mayavati. He became Vice President of the Order in 1979, and was elected as the 11th President in 1985, serving until his death in 1988.

He died on 27 December 1988, at 7:27 pm at Ramakrishna Mission Seva Pratishthan from severe lung-infection and cardiac problems.

== Works ==
=== Translations ===
He translated Adi Shankaracharya's major commentaries into English, namely the Brahma Sutra, ten Major Upanishads, and the Bhagavad Gita, and numerous other works related to Vedanta and Ramakrishna-Vivekananda literature.

- Brahma Sutra Bhashya With the Commentary of Sri Shankaracharya. Kolkata: Advaita Ashrama. 1965. p. 944. ISBN 81-7505-105-1.
- Eight Upanishads With the Commentary of Shankaracharya. Kolkata: Advaita Ashrama. 1989. p. 952. ISBN 81-7505-015-2.
- Bhagavad Gita [HB] With the commentary of Shankaracharya. Kolkata: Advaita Ashrama. 1997. p. 848. ISBN 81-7505-041-1.
- Isa Upanishad With the Commentary of Shankaracharya. Kolkata: Advaita Ashrama. 1996. p. 40. ISBN 81-7505-093-4.
- Kena Upanishad With the Commentary of Shankaracharya. Kolkata: Advaita Ashrama. 1998. p. 72. ISBN 81-7505-068-3.
- Katha Upanishad With the Commentary of Shankaracharya. Kolkata: Advaita Ashrama. October 1996. p. 152. ISBN 81-85301-33-6.
- Prasna Upanishad With the Commentary of Shankaracharya. Kolkata: Advaita Ashrama. 1998. p. 112. ISBN 81-7505-023-3.
- Mundaka Upanishad With the Commentary of Shankaracharya. Kolkata: Advaita Ashrama. 1995. p. 108. ISBN 81-7505-098-5.
- Mandukya Upanishad With the Commentary of Shankaracharya. Kolkata: Advaita Ashrama. 1995. p. 256. ISBN 81-7505-099-3.
- Taittiriya Upanishad With the Commentary of Shankaracharya. Kolkata: Advaita Ashrama. 2004. p. 192. ISBN 81-7505-024-1.
- Aitareya Upanishad With the commentary of Shankaracharya. Kolkata: Advaita Ashrama. 1999. p. 80. ISBN 81-85301-34-4.
- Chandogya Upanishad With the Commentary of Shankaracharya. Kolkata: Advaita Ashrama. 1983. p. 728. ISBN 81-7505-100-0.
- Shvetashvatara Upanishad With the Commentary of Shankaracharya. Kolkata: Advaita Ashrama. 1986. p. 232. ISBN 81-7505-103-5.

=== Other English works ===
- The apostles of Shri Ramakrishna (compiler, editor), Advaita Ashrama, 2nd ed. 1972
- Holy Mother: Sri Sarada Devi. Chennai: Ramakrishna Math. 1977. p. 540. ISBN 81-7823-186-7.

=== Bengali ===
- Upanishad Granthavali (in 3 Vols) (in Bengali). Kolkata: Udbodhan Karyalaya.
- Kah Panthah (in Bengali). Kolkata: Udbodhan Karyalaya. p. 118. ISBN 81-8040-285-1.
- Juganayak Vivekananda(set of 3 books) (in Bengali). Kolkata: Udbodhan Karyalaya. p. 1184. ISBN 81-8040-112-X.
- Navajugadharma (in Bengali). Kolkata: Udbodhan Karyalaya. p. 280.
- Stavakusumanjali (in Bengali). Kolkata: Udbodhan Karyalaya. p. 408. ISBN 81-8040-225-8.
- Sri Ma Sarada Devi (in Bengali). Kolkata: Udbodhan Karyalaya. p. 428. ISBN 81-8040-071-9.
- Siddhantalesha Samgraha of Appayadikshit (in Bengali). Kolkata: Udbodhan Karyalaya. p. 272. ISBN 81-8040-215-0.
- Sri Ramakrishna Bhaktamalika (in Bengali). Kolkata: Udbodhan Karyalaya. p. 714. ISBN 81-8040-493-5.
- Vartaman Yug O Sri Ramakrishna Bhavdhara (in Bengali). Kolkata: Udbodhan Karyalaya. p. 47.

=== Hindi ===
- Yuganayak Vivekananda (in Hindi). Nagpur: Ramakrishna Math. p. 1151.
- Sri Ma Sarada Devi (in Hindi). Kolkata: Advaita Ashrama. p. 392. ISBN 81-85301-96-4.
- Sri Ramakrishna Bhaktamalika (in Hindi). Nagpur: Ramakrishna Math. p. 769.
