= Advaita Ashrama =

Branch of the Ramakrishna Math

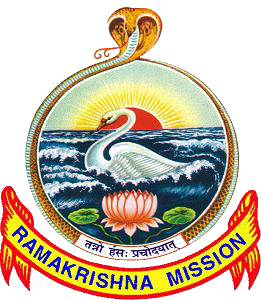
- Emblem of Ramakrishna Mission
- Formation: 1899
- Purpose: Philanthropic, Religious Studies, Spirituality
- Headquarters: Belur Math
- Coordinates: 29.373174°N 80.061316°E
- Region served: Worldwide
- Website: advaitaashrama.org

Advaita Ashrama, Mayavati, is a branch of the Ramakrishna Math, founded on 19 March 1899 at the behest of Vivekananda, by his disciples James Henry Sevier, and Charlotte Sevier. Today it publishes the original writings of Vivekananda. As an ashram dedicated to the study and practice of Advaita Vedanta, no images or idols are worshipped there, not even of Ramakrishna; and no images were kept in the premises according to the Ashram ideals set by Vivekananda.

Also referred as the Mayawati Ashram, it is located at an altitude of 1940 meters, 22 km from Champawat in Champawat district, Uttarakhand, and 9 km from the town of Lohaghat. The ashram is a major publication centre of the Ramakrishna Order for books in English and Hindi, mainly through its branch in Kolkata. It also maintains a charitable hospital at Mayavati. Among its important publications are The Complete Works of Swami Vivekananda in English and as well as a Hindi translation, The Life of Swami Vivekananda, and English translations of important Hindu scriptures.

Some of the old manuscripts of the ashram have now been microfilmed and preserved at Indira Gandhi National Centre for the Arts (IGNCA) in Delhi.

== History ==
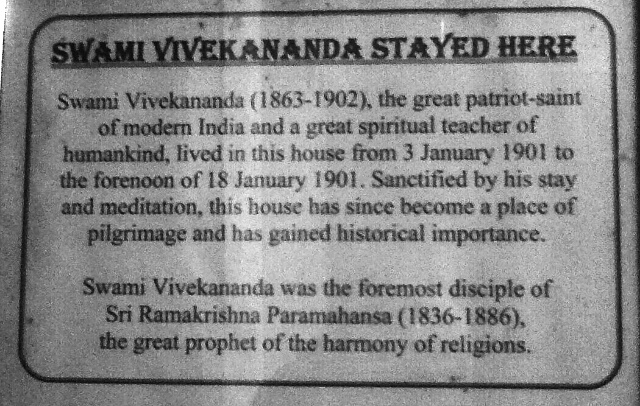
The cenotaph of Vivekananda in Advita Ashrama

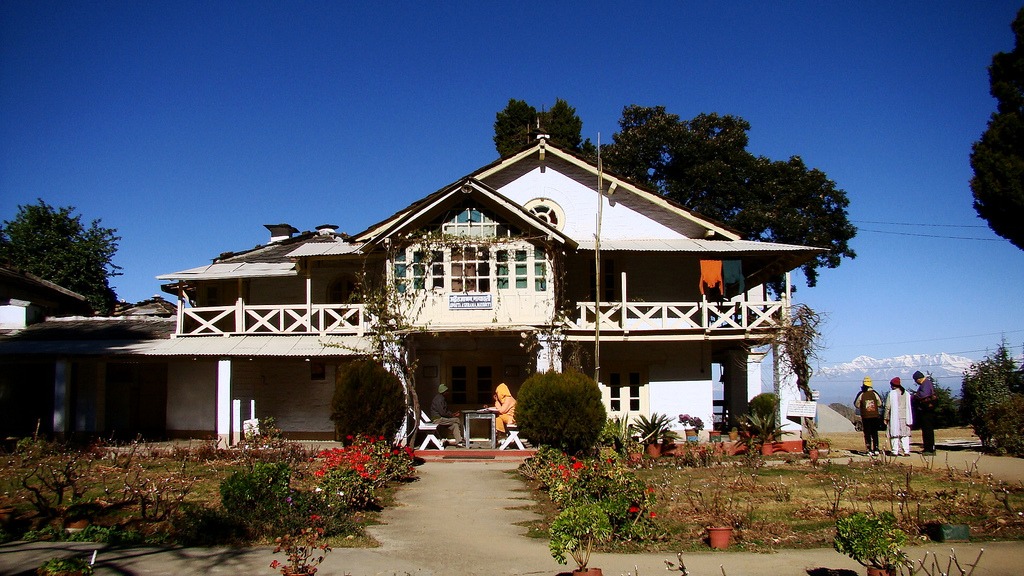
Advaita Ashrama, Mayavati, a branch of the Ramakrishna Math, founded on 19 March 1899.

The Advaita Ashrama has its origins in 1896, when Vivekananda was travelling through the Alps recuperating, and expressed the desire to have a similar place in India, for retreat and study of Vedas.

Earlier, in 1895, James Henry Sevier who had served as a captain in the British Indian Army for 5 years, and his wife Charlotte Elizabeth Sevier, met Vivekananda in England. Later in 1896, for nearly nine months, they travelled with him through Switzerland, Germany, and Italy. It was in the Alps that Vivekananda, while travelling with the couple, that he expressed his desire to have a similar retreat for the monks in the Himalayas. In December 1896, the couple moved to India, with Vivekananda on board a steamer from Naples, Italy, with an objective to find a place near Almora, and set up an Ashram, and arriving at Madras in February 1897. Soon just as Vivekananda left for Calcutta, the couple left for Almora, where they rented a bungalow and this became the residence of Vivekananda and the Seviers for the next two years.

Later when he left for Kashmir, the Sevier couple along with Swami Swarupananda, a monastic disciple of Vivekananda, started travelling to the interior area looking for a suitable place, which was eventually found in July 1898, set amidst dense deodar, pine and oak forests; the land which was until then a tea estate was promptly purchased, and decided upon for the new Ashram. Finally, with the help of Swami Swarupananda, the Ashram was set up, along with a small dwelling for the monks, ashramites and the couple themselves, around the same time as the Belur Math was being established near Kolkata, when they moved in on 19 March 1899.

After the sudden death of its first editor, 24-year-old B. R. Rajam Iyer at Madras (Chennai), the publication of the English Journal Prabuddha Bharata was discontinued for a few months in May 1898. Meanwhile, in Almora, Vivekananda asked the Sevier couple to revive the magazine, and the editorship was given to Swami Swarupananda, who not only became the first head of the Ashram upon its opening on 19 March 1899, but also remained its editor, at its new base hence forth; and they held the position until his death in 1906.

Upon its foundation, Vivekananda sent the following letter, in March 1899, entailing the prospectus of the Ashram:

"...To give this One Truth a freer and fuller scope in elevating the lives of individuals and leavening the mass of mankind, we start this Advaita Ashrama on the Himalayan heights, the land of its first expiration.

Here it is hoped to keep Advaita free from all superstitions and weakening contaminations. Here will be taught and practised nothing but the Doctrine of Unity, pure and simple; and though in entire sympathy with all other systems, this Ashrama is dedicated to Advaita and Advaita alone."

James Sevier died on 28 October 1900, and was cremated by the nearby Sarada River, according to Hindu traditions as he had wished. Vivekananda visited the Ashram from 3 to 18 January 1901, primarily to console her, and his place of residence has now been turned into a library. Charlotte Sevier continued to stay at the Ashram for several years.

== Publications ==
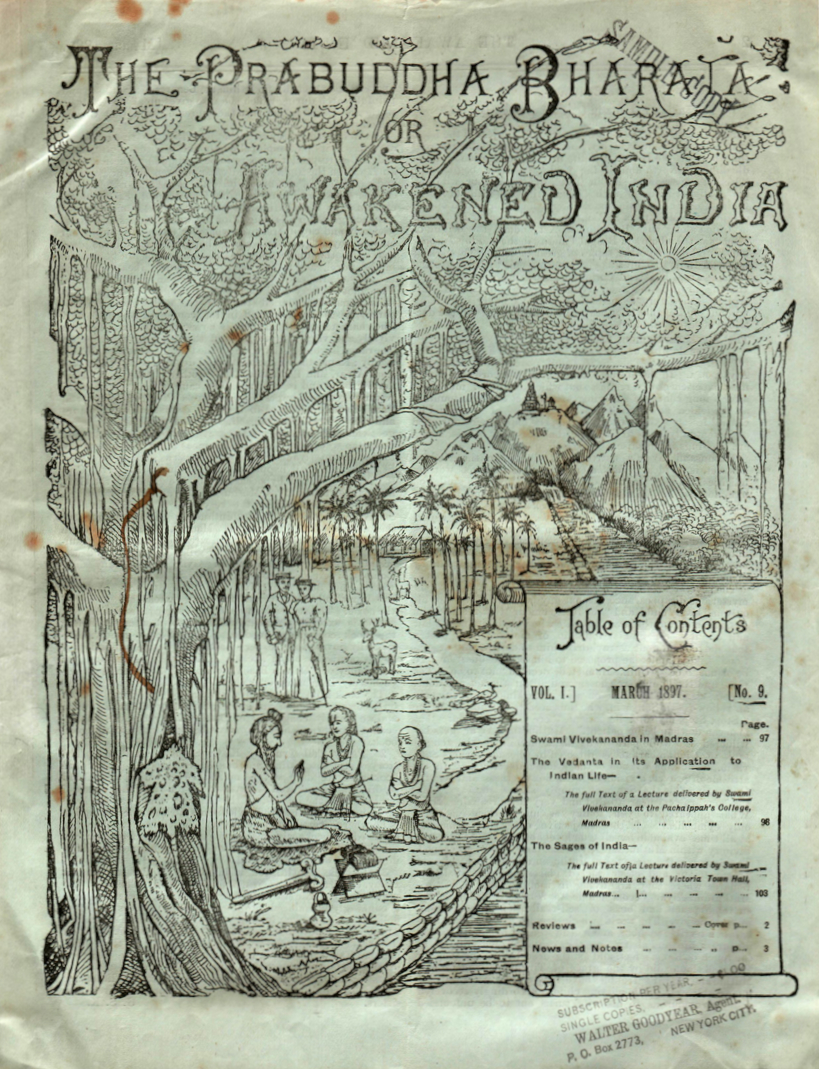
Prabuddha Bharata, the March 1897 Isuue

Advaita Ashrama publishes many important books in English and Hindi, as well as the English Journal Prabuddha Bharata which is being published since July 1896, making it the oldest running Journal by Ramakrishna Mission. A list of its most well-known other publications is as follows.

- The Complete Works of Swami Vivekananda Online version
  - Other works of Swami Vivekananda, like:
  - Bhakti Yoga
  - Jnana Yoga
  - Karma Yoga
  - Raja Yoga
  - Letters of Swami Vivekananda
- The Life of Swami Vivekananda by His Eastern and Western Disciples Online version
- Srimad Bhagavad Gita translated by Swami Swarupananda, 1907 Online version
- Eight Upanishads with the commentary of Shankaracharya, translated by Swami Gambhirananda

== Adhyakshas of Advaita Ashrama ==
The first three adhyakshas of Advaita Ashrama were also editors of the Prabuddha Bharata. Thereafter, the post of Adhyaksha and Editor were held by different persons. From 1959, the Ashrama Adhyaksha was also called the Editor of Prabuddha Bharata, and the actual editor called the "joint editor". From September 1993, the Ashrama Adhyaksha is known as the Managing Editor, and the Editor is known as the Editor.

Adhyakshas of Advaita Ashrama
| × | Period | Adhyaksha |
|---|---|---|
| 1 | 1899 to 1906 | Swami Swarupananda |
| 2 | 1906 to 1913 | Swami Virajananda |
| 3 | 1914 to 1918 | Swami Prajnananda |
| 4 | 1918 to 1927 | Swami Madhavananda |
| 5 | 1927 to 1937 | Swami Vireswarananda (Prabhu Maharaj) |
| 6 | 1937 to 1947 | Swami Pavitrananda |
| 7 | 1948 to 1953 | Swami Yogeswarananda |
| 8 | 1953 to 1963 | Swami Gambhirananda |
| 9 | 1964 to 1968 | Swami Chidatmananda |
| 10 | 1969 to 1976 | Swami Budhananda (Bhabani Maharaj) |
| 11 | 1976 to 1977 | Swami Vandanananda |
| 12 | 1977 to 1978 | Swami Tadrupananda |
| 13 | 1978 to 1988 | Swami Ananyananda |
| 14 | 1988 to 1990 | Swami Swananda |
| 15 | 1991 to 2006 | Swami Mumukshananda (Chittaranjan Maharaj) |
| 16 | 2006 to 2013 | Swami Bodhasarananda (Aurobindo Maharaj) |
| 17 | 2014 to 2017 | Swami Tattwavidananda (Gourdas Maharaj) |
| 18 | 2017 to 2019 | Swami Muktidananda |
| 19 | 2019–Present | Swami Shuddhidananda (Sudhir Maharaj) |
