= Vedanta Kesari =

The Vedanta Kesari
- Editor: Ramakrishna Order
- Categories: spiritual, religious, cultural
- Frequency: Monthly
- Publisher: Ramakrishna Math, Chennai
- First issue: September 1895
- Country: India
- Language: English
- Website: http://www.chennaimath.org/estore/magazine-subscriptions/the-vedanta-kesari
- ISSN: 0042-2983

The Vedanta Kesari (The Lion of Vedanta), formerly known as Brahmavadin, is an English-language monthly magazine covering spiritual and cultural issues. Published by the Ramakrishna Math in Chennai, India, it has been in circulation since 1895.

== History ==
Under the inspiration of Swami Vivekananda, a group of his disciples in Madras, which included G. Venkataranga Rao, M.C. Nanjunda Rao, and Alasinga Perumal, started a monthly journal titled Brahmavadin on 14 September 1895.

One of Swamiji's letters to Alasinga read: "I learnt from your letters the bad financial state that Brahmavadin is in." Swamiji repeatedly said, "The Brahmavadin is a jewel-it must not perish!". It continued to be brought out regularly for 14 years, until Alasinga's demise in 1909. From 1909 to 1914, the publication of Brahmavadin became quite irregular. The last issue was brought out in 1914 (March–April).

Soon after, the legacy of Brahmavadin was continued by a new journal, The Vedanta Kesari, which was started by Sri Ramakrishna Math, Chennai, and has been in circulation ever since.

== Circulation ==
The Vedanta Kesari is one of India's oldest English-language religious magazines, having been published for 106 years as of 2019. It has a monthly circulation of over 12,000 copies, with more than 2,000 sent to public and institutional libraries across India. The magazine also has subscribers in 27 countries.

== Contents ==
The Vedanta Kesari contains articles on Indian spiritual traditions and scriptures, focusing on the philosophy of Vedanta as expounded by Swami Vivekananda, the disciple of Ramakrishna, a nineteenth century Indian mystic. There are articles based on the teachings of Ramakrishna, as well as a section on book reviews of books on similar topics. The stated aim of the magazine is to promote a spiritual and matured outlook towards life. It advocates renunciation of selfish desires, along with the service to others in a spirit of worship-fulness.

Most articles published in the Vedanta Kesari are originally written for the magazine, though a few transcriptions of the lectures and speeches are also published.

Many scholars have contributed to Vedanta Kesari over time. Its contributors include John Woodroffe, Mahatma Gandhi, Sarojini Naidu, C. Rajagopalachari, T.L. Vaswani, K.M. Munshi, Karan Singh, Dalai Lama and A.P.J. Abdul Kalam. Many monks of the Ramakrishna Order also contribute to the magazine.

Since 1978, the magazine has been regularly bringing out an annual issue centred on a particular theme. Some of its popular theme-based issues published so far are: Yoga and its Aspects, Values for the Present Age, Globalization, Religion Today, Culture and Civilization, Channeling Youth Power, Nurturing Inter - personal Relationship, Upanishads in Daily Life, among others. Many of these numbers have later been made into books and published by the Ramakrishna Math.

Some of the well-known books published from the Math were originally serialized in the Vedanta Kesari. Among such are included such popular volumes such as Upanishad Series (Sanskrit, with English translation by Swami Sharvananda), Sri Ramakrishna, the Great Master (by Swami Saradananda), Bhakti Schools of Vedanta (by Swami Tapasyananda), and so on.

== Editors ==
From May 1914 to April 1928, the magazine had no official editor. The April 1926 issue stated: "Swami Sharvananda who has been the President of the Ramakrishna Math and Mission in Madras since 1911 and has been editing the Vedanta Kesari from its very start is retiring from work after nineteen years of strenuous labour. He means to lead at present a life of perfect solitude and retirement.

"Swami Yatiswarananda who has been in charge of the Ramakrishna Ashrama in Bombay for nearly the last two years has come over to take charge of the Math and Mission in Madras. He has spent eight years of his monastic life in South India and has an intimate knowledge of several of its parts. He is the late editor of the Prabuddha Bharata and is well known for his scholarship and literary abilities. He was also intimately connected with the editorial work and the publication of the Vedanta Kesari for a long period. Our Journal will appear under his editorship from May next. All official correspondence must hereafter be addressed to him. We pray to the Lord to crown his work with complete success.'

1928 May onwards, The Vedanta Kesari started printing the names of the editors. It would mention both the names (president of Madras Math and the actual editor) as 'Editors'. September 1993 onwards, nomenclature was changed over to 'Managing Editor & Editor'

Editors of Vedanta Kesari
×	Period	Editor
1	May 1928 to April 1931	Br. Jnana chaitanya (Swami Tejasananda)
2	May 1931 to April 1939	Swami Tapasyananda
3	May 1939 to April 1941	Swami Vimalananda
4	May 1941 to April 1942	Prof. PN Srinivasachar
5	May 1942 to November 1948	Swami Nityabodhananda
6	December 1948 to September 1951	Swami Kailasananda
7	October 1951 to July 1956	Swami Budhananda
8	August 1956 to April 1962	Swami Swahananda
9	May 1962 to April 1967	Swami Paratparananda
10	May 1967 to July 1971	Swami Kailasananda
11	August 1971 to September 1979	Shri R. Ramakrishnan
12	October 1979 to December 1986	Shri CS Ramakrishnan
13	January 1987 to December 1997	Swami Tyagananda
14	January 1998 to December 2000	Swami Brahmeshananda
15	January 2001 to March 2004	Swami Baneshananda
16	April 2004 to July 2016	Swami Atmashraddhananda
17	August 2016 to December 2022	Swami Mahamedhananda
18	January 2023 to June 2024	Swami Divyakripananda
19	Since July 2024	Swami Lakshmidharananda

== See also ==
- Prabuddha Bharata
