= Golap Ma =

Disciple of Sri Ramakrishna

- Golap Sundari Devi
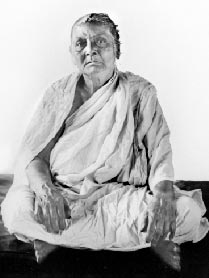
- Golap Ma, the direct disciple of Sri Ramakrishna and attendant of Sri Sarada Devi
- Born: Golap Sundari; Baghbazar, Calcutta, Bengal Presidency, British India
- Died: 19 December 1924; Calcutta, Bengal Presidency, British India
- Other names: Annapurna Devi, Golap Ma
- Occupation: Housewife
- Known for: Spiritual work
- Children: one Son, one daughter

Golap Ma (Bengali: গোলাপ মা) was a direct householder disciple of Sri Ramakrishna, the 19th-century mystic and saint, and a foremost companion of Sri Sarada Devi, his spiritual consort and the Holy Mother of Ramakrishna Order, along with her other companion, Yogin Ma. Her real name was Annapurna Devi, or Golap Sundari Devi. She was also referred to as a "grief-stricken Brahmani" in the Gospel of Sri Ramakrishna. She played a very important role in the early development of the Sri Ramakrishna movement and stayed, until her death, in Udbodhan, the house where the Holy Mother stayed in Calcutta. She was popular as Golap Ma (translation: Mother Golap) among the devotees of the Ramakrishna Order.

== Early life ==
Very little is known about the early life of Golap Ma, except that she was born into a Brahmin family in the Baghbazar area of North Calcutta, probably in the 1840s. She was married and had a son, and a daughter named Chandi. Chandi was married to Saurindra Mohan Tagore of the Tagore family in Pathuriaghata, Calcutta. However, she lost her husband, son and daughter in quick succession and was grief-stricken on account of her loss. She was brought to Sri Ramakrishna by Yogin Ma, who was her neighbour.

== Sri Ramakrishna's influence ==
She met Sri Ramakrishna in 1885 in a grief-stricken state. He assuaged her grief and introduced her to Sri Sarada Devi. She soon became an intimate companion of the latter. On one occasion, Sri Ramakrishna visited the house of Golap Ma, on 28 July 1885, as recorded in the Gospel of Sri Ramakrishna. Golap Ma was one of the major women disciples of Ramakrishna and could render him personal service (sevā) through carrying his food and cleaning his room. During Sri Ramakrishna's illness, she provided dedicated service to him and was the constant companion of Sri Sarada Devi, first in Shyampukur and then in Cossipore.

== As companion of Sri Sarada Devi ==
After the death of Sri Ramakrishna, Golap Ma accompanied Sri Sarada Devi to the holy places of Varanasi and Vrindavan. Afterwards, she was one of the first to report on the abject poverty of Sri Sarada Devi in Kamarpukur, and was instrumental in bringing her to Calcutta in 1888. Sri Sarada Devi used to affectionately call Golap Ma "Vijaya" and Yogin Ma "Jaya". She stayed with Sarada Devi whenever the latter stayed in Calcutta and later accompanied her to Puri, Rameswaram, Madras and other places. Subsequently, when the Udbodhan house was constructed for the Holy Mother, by Swami Saradananda, Golap Ma came to stay there permanently. She also traveled to Jayrambati, Sarada Devi's village. As the companion of Sri Sarada Devi, Golap Ma used to perform many of the household chores and also served as a major point of interaction with Sarada's devotees. Sri Sarada Devi used to speak through her to some of the male devotees, including Swami Vivekananda. As a companion of Sarada Devi, she had the unique opportunity of seeing and interacting with her from very close quarters, and therefore was a major source of information on her life and activities.

== Last years ==
She was described as kind and charitable, and during her last years, she was preoccupied with her spiritual practices. Half of her income was spent on charity to the poor and needy. Sarada Devi said that "Golap has attained spiritual illumination through japam (repeating the name of God)". Her life was simple but austere. She was literate and could study the scriptures like Mahabharata and the Bhagavad Gita.

After Sri Sarada Devi died on 21 July 1920, Golap Ma, together with Yogin Ma and Swami Saradananda, became the spiritual mainstay for Sarada's devotees. She died on 19 December 1924.

== External sources ==
- They Lived with God, by Swami Chetanananda, published by Vedanta Society of St. Louis
