= Niranjanananda =

Disciple of Ramakrishna Paramahamsa (1862–1904)

Swami Niranjanananda
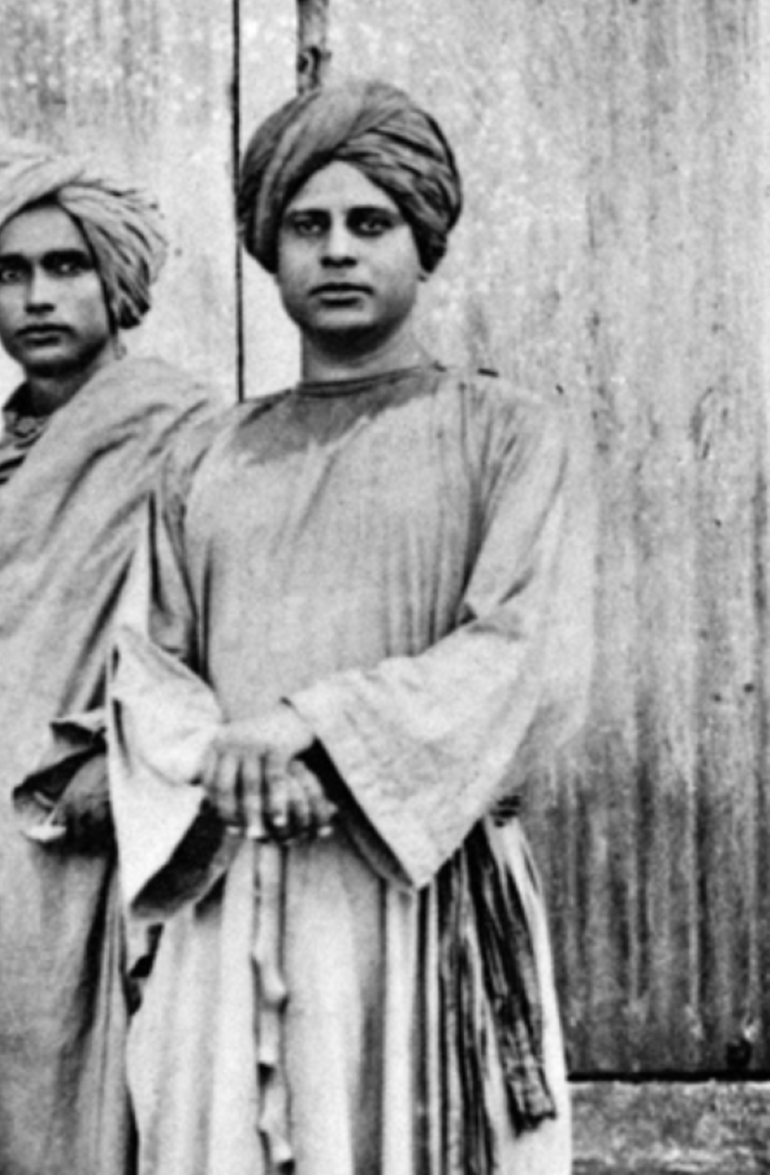

Personal life
- Born: Nityaniranjan Ghosh; 1862 Rajarhat Bishnupur, Calcutta, Bengal Presidency, British India
- Died: 9 May 1904 (aged 41–42) Haridwar, British India

Religious life
- Religion: Hinduism
- Philosophy: Advaita Vedanta

Religious career
- Teacher: Ramakrishna Paramahamsa

Swami Niranjanananda (Senior), born as Nitya Niranjan Ghosh, usually called by the shortened name of Niranjan, was one of the foremost monks of Ramakrishna Mission and was one of the direct monastic disciples of Ramakrishna. Niranjanananda was one of those few disciples, whom Ramakrishna termed as "Nityasiddhas" or "Ishwarakotis" – that is, souls who are ever perfect. [Niranjanananda is termed Senior since there was another swami, Niranjanananda (Junior) also known as Pandalai Maharaj, later in the Ramakrishna Mission who died in 1972].

== Biography ==
=== Early life ===
Niranjanananda was born as Nityaniranjan Ghosh and he was called by the short name of Niranjan. Little is known about his early life except that he came from a village called Rajarhat-Bishnupur in 24 Paraganas of Bengal province. He lived in Calcutta with his maternal uncle Kalikrishna Mitra. In his boyhood he became associated with a group of spiritualists and was considered as a successful medium. He was frank and open-minded, a trait which was appreciated by Ramakrishna. He had an abhorrence for married life and a relatively short temper, even though he was tender in nature. He later took up job with an indigo planter in the district of Murshidabad.

=== Influence of Sri Ramakrishna ===
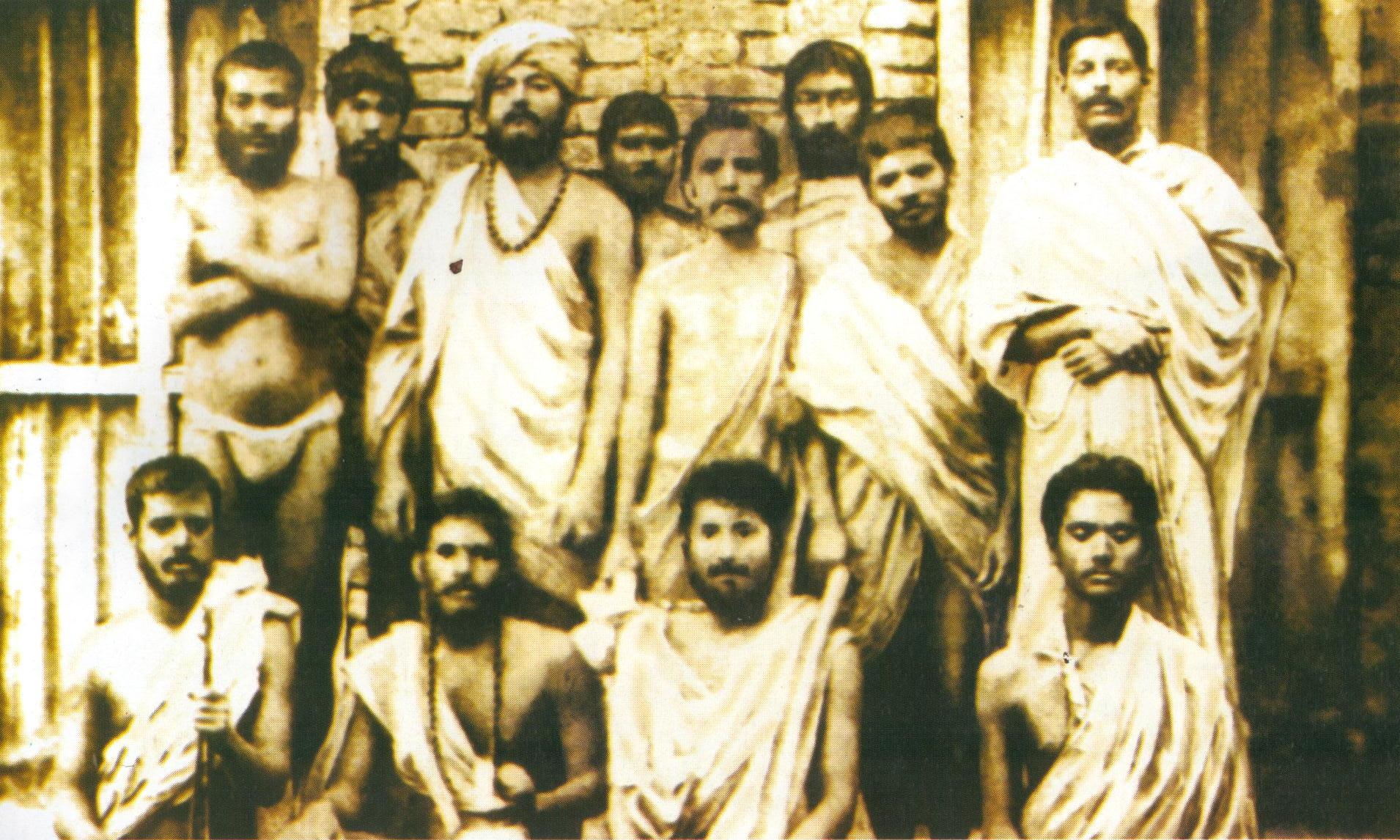
Group photo taken on 30 January 1887 in Baranagar Math, Kolkata. Standing: (l–r) ) Shivananda, Ramakrishnananda, Vivekananda, Randhuni, Debendranath Majumdar, Mahendranath Gupta (Shri M), Trigunatitananda, H. Mustafi Sitting: (l–r) Niranjanananda, Saradananda, Hutko Gopal, Abhedananda

Niranjan was about eighteen years old when he met Ramakrishna for the first time. When he discovered his leanings towards spiritualism, Ramakrishna apparently chided him saying that, "if you think of ghosts and spooks, ghosts and spooks you will become, if you think of God, divine will be your life." He later told Niranjan when he visited him for the second time, "My boy, days are passing, when will you realise God?". Niranjan was impressed, and he continued his association with Ramakrishna. Once, when Niranjan was travelling by a boat to Dakshineswar, some of his fellow passengers began to speak ill about his master. This angered Niranjan, so he threatened to drown the entire boat. When Ramakrishna heard about the incident he disapproved by saying that, "Anger is a deadly sin, why should you be subject, to it? Foolish people in their pitiable ignorance say many things. One should completely ignore them as beneath notice".

Ramakrishna also disapproved of Niranjan working in an office, but he consented when he heard that Niranjan took up the job to maintain his aged mother.

When the master was ill and was kept in Shyampukur by his devotees, Niranajn quit his job to work as the gatekeeper of the house. There he was fooled by actress Binodini Dasi who visited an ailing Ramakrishna in the disguise of a European gentleman. Later when Ramakrishna was shifted to Cossipore garden house he continued with his role as a gatekeeper with utmost devotion and prevented at least two lay disciples of Ramakrishna from entering the premises when the master was critically ill, among them Ramachandra Dutta and Atul Ghosh, the brother of Girish Chandra Ghosh.

After the death of Ramakrishna, there was a dispute among his disciples with the ownership of the relics, which was mitigated with the help of Narendra (later Vivekananda). Niranjan, together with Shashi Maharaj (later Ramakrishnananda) preserved most of the relics in a separate urn and this they kept in the house of Balaram Bose, which was later removed to Belur Math.

=== Monastic life ===
Niranjan took his monastic vow along with other brother disciples in 1887 and came to stay permanently in the Baranagar Math, the first abode of the monks of the Ramakrishna order. He was given the monastic name of Swami Niranjanananda (Niranjan – the blameless or the guileless one, and ananda – bliss), by Vivekananda. In the monastery he did laborious tasks, being physically stronger. He travelled to Puri and returned in April 1887. He made an altar for the Master in the old monastery house and also planted a Bel Tree on the same spot where Ramakrishna was cremated in Cossipore and created an altar around the tree. He went for a pilgrimage in November 1889 to Deoghar and stayed in Banshi Dutt's garden house, living on alms. He went to Prayag (Allahabad), travelled through various parts of India and went to Colombo in Sri Lanka. For some time he lived there as a preaching missionary, teaching the ideals of his Master. In 1895, he returned to the Alambazar monastery before the birthday of Ramakrishna. When Vivekananda returned to India, Niranjanananda went to Colombo to receive him in 1897. He travelled with Swami Vivekananda all over Northern and Southern India. In 1898, he went to Almora and there he initiated Shuddhananda (Sudhir Maharaj). He then went to Varanasi and lived on alms. He inspired a group of youth to follow the path of service and renunciation, who later organised the home of service.

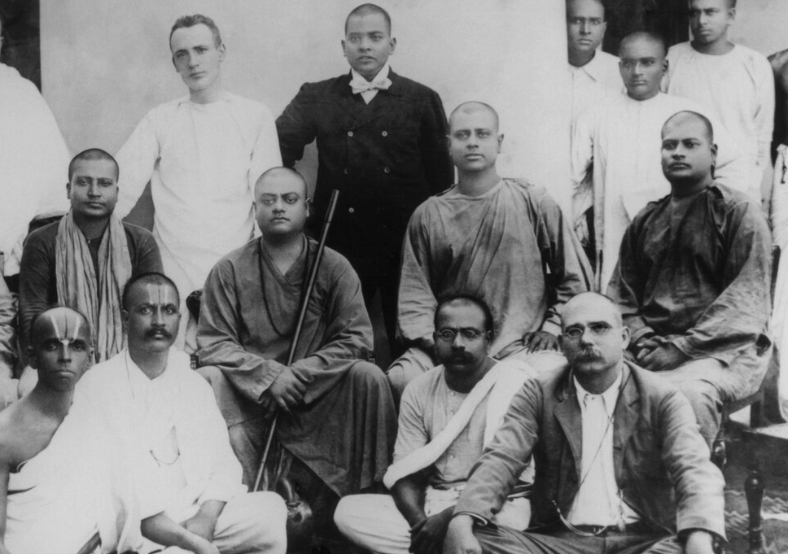
Seated on chairs Swami Shivananda, Swami Vivekananda, Swami Niranjananda and Swami Sadananda.

He later went to Kankhal near Haridwar and became ill and returned to Calcutta for treatment. Upon recovery, he went back to Varanasi, met Vivekananda there. During Vivekananda's illness he arranged for Ayurvedic treatment and during the latter's last days he was his gatekeeper, preventing people from crowding and disturbing an ailing Vivekananda in his room. After Vivekananda's death, he returned to Haridwar. During his last days, he suffered from chronic dysentery. He died 9 May 1904.

=== With Holy Mother ===
Niranjanananda, like his brother disciples, held the Sarada Devi in high esteem, calling her the holy mother. He took Girish Chandra Ghosh to the holy mother in her native village of Jairambati when the latter was going through a period of depression. Before his death, he came to meet her and insisted that she did everything for him, including preparing food for him and feeding him.

=== Character and legacy ===
According to Ramakrishna, Niranjan was a pure soul, and it was easy for him to realise god because he was guileless. According to the memoirs of his associate Achalananda (Kedar Maharaj) and the accounts of other brother disciples, Niranjan was known for his simplicity, truthfulness, purity, fearlessness, steadiness (in any matter of principle) and renunciation. He once saved Sarada (Trigunatitananda), a brother disciple, from drowning. He took up philanthropic and charitable work at the behest of Vivekananda and later formed the Sevashrama or the Ramakrishna Mission Home of Service at Varanasi, by inspiring a group of young men to renounce the world and take up the service of the poor. Despite in need for fund, he refused donation from a rich person when the latter went back on his promise. He nursed many of his brother disciples, including Yogananda whenever they were ill. He believed in Ramakrishna as the infinite god in human form, did not put much stress on rituals, and had faith in the doctrine of service.
