= Sara Chapman Bull =

Writer, disciple of Swami Vivekananda

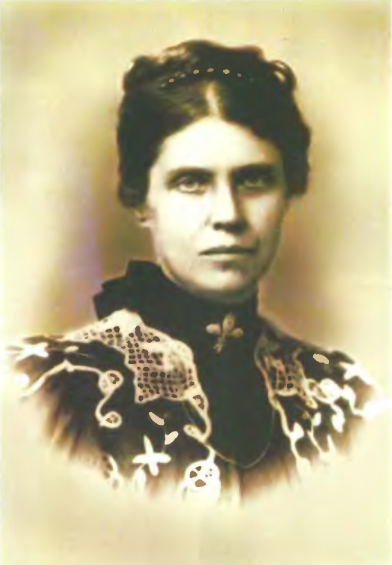
- Sara Bull
- Born: Sara Chapman Thorp; 24 May 1850; Upstate New York
- Died: 14 January 1911 (aged 60); Cambridge, Massachusetts
- Other names: Sara Chapman Bull, Dhira Mata
- Occupations: Musicologist, writer and religious activist of Vedanta
- Known for: Disciple of Vivekananda
- Spouse: Ole Bornemann Bull (m. 1870; died 1880)
- Children: Olea Vaughan (daughter)
- Relatives: Edwina Vaughan (granddaughter)

Sara Chapman Thorp Bull (May 24, 1850 – January 14, 1911; née Sara Chapman Thorp; also known as Saint Sara) was an American writer and philanthropist. She was a dedicated disciple of Swami Vivekananda and was married to Ole Bull, a Norwegian violinist.

== Family life ==
Christened Sara Chapman Thorp, she was born in 1850 in Upstate New York, the only daughter of Joseph G. Thorp and his wife, Susan Amelia (née Chapman). Her father had relocated to Madison, Wisconsin to promote his lumber trade, later becoming a Wisconsin State Senator. Her mother was a prominent socialite. Sara had at least one sibling, a brother, Joseph Gilbert Thorp. Sara was interested in music and piano was her forte; a grand piano was kept in their house.

In 1868, Ole Bull, a violinist, who was a widower, met Sara. Sara and Ole Bull were secretly married in June of that year. After they returned to the United States in the fall season, a formal wedding was held in Madison. A daughter, Olea, was born in March 1871. Sara lived in Madison for a few years in a house which was a gift from her father. The Bulls spent ten years happily married. Sara toured with Ole many times to the U.S. and Europe. She accompanied him during musical concerts as his pianist. In 1879, Sara, with her daughter and mother, moved to Cambridge, Massachusetts and lived in a rented house called "Elmwood". Two years later, Ole purchased a summer house in West Lebanon, Maine and named it "Ironwell".

Sara managed the couple's finances. Their house was the center of intellectual activities in which leading intelligentsia, artists and philosophers of Harvard University, like William James, George Santayana, Josiah Royce, and many others were regular participants. Music was part of their activity, in the form of the "Cambridge Conferences". The conferences were held at their Brattle Street house and included a series of lectures from 1896 to 1899. Sara's friends, who were also active in her cultural and social activities, were Julia Ward Howe, Annie Allegra Longfellow Thorp (wife of Sara's brother Joseph, and daughter of Henry Wadsworth Longfellow), Alice Mary Longfellow, and Sarah Orne Jewett. She was a member of the Cambridge Garden Club, the Sesame Club in London, and the Barnard Club in New York City.

After her husband's death in 1880, Sara wrote his biography titled Ole Bull, a Memoir, which was published in 1882. Having acquired an interest in Norway, her husband's place of birth, she participated in activities of the Scandinavian community. She turned to philosophy, read the Bhagavad Gita and became a deeply spiritual person. She also developed an interest in Eastern religions, particularly of Vedanta philosophy after she became a disciple of Swami Vivekananda.

== Association with Vedanta Movement and Ramakrishna Vivekananda Order ==
Sara met Vivekananda in the spring of 1894. She was impressed by his depth of spiritual knowledge, as she herself was deeply spiritual. In the summer of 1895, she invited Vivekananda to be her guest. She also invited her friend, Professor William James, to meet Vivekananda. They had long conversations many times. Sara was struck by Vivekananda's innocence and lack of worldly ways, which was similar to her late husband's manner; Vivekananda soon became her Indian "son" and guru. Bull was one of the few American women who associated with Swami Vivekananda and the others were Mary Hale, Josephine MacLeod, Sister Christine and Margaret Noble (Sister Nivedita in later years). They were in constant touch through letters. Vivekananda considered Sara Bull as his American mother, addressing her as Dhira Mata (calm mother), and also as Mother Sara.

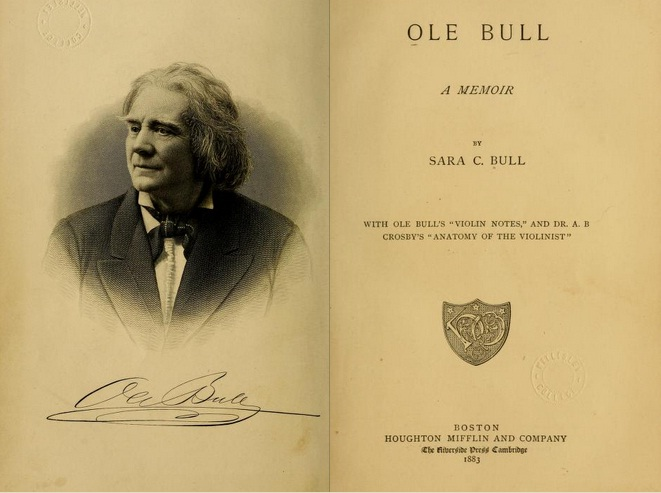
Title page of Ole Bull A Memoir 1883 edition written by Sara Chapman Bull

She was very generous. She made several visits to India trying to help the cause of women. Swami Saradananda (Sharat), disciple of Ramakrishna Paramhansa, who came from India, started working in New York City to help Vivekananda and Sara. He developed a cordial and trusting relationship with Sara, and they exchanged letters. She provided Saradananda's brothers with financial support for education. She also provided financial help to Vivekananda's cousin. Sara regularly sent money to Ramakrishna’s disciples visiting the Belur Math monastery to provide a home for their stay. She even supported the detractors of Vivekananda – Kripananda (Landsberg) and E.T. Sturdy with regular financial support. She supported Jagadish Chandra Bose in his scientific research, and when he was sick in London in 1900, she paid for his treatment. Jagadish Chandra Bose and his wife Lady Abala had a very close relationship with her throughout her life. She gave financial assistance of US$4,000 to Bose to set up his own botanical research laboratory. Sara held Sarada Devi, the spiritual consort of Sri Ramakrishna reverentially and was primarily responsible for getting her photographed during her visit to India in 1898. She enjoyed a good relationship with other Swamis and disciples of Sri Ramakrishna including Swami Brahmananda, Yogin Ma, Gopaler Ma among others. When Swami Abhedananda, a brother disciple of Swami Vivekananda went to head the Vedanta Society of New York, Sara had assisted him initially, but soon they had a disagreement over the functioning of the society. Later Sara also helped Swami Paramananda, a disciple of Swami Vivekananda, to settle and preach in Boston.

== Association with art and culture ==
Sara was deeply interested in music, being an accomplished pianist herself. She also had interests in art, literature and other cultural pursuits. She developed friendship with Kakuzo Okakura, the Japanese scholar and artist, and she had stayed with him during her visit to Japan. Okakura also stayed in her studio when he was in Boston. Emma Thursby the famous singer was her lifelong friend, who also traveled to Japan along with her.

== Later life and legacy ==
Sara lived in Cambridge for 40 years, though she spent her summers at Elliot. Olea Vaughan, Sara's married daughter, lived with her. Sara was deeply grieved when her first granddaughter, Edwina Vaughan, died. Sara Bull conceptualized and promoted the idea of Cambridge Conference where she had invited many noted speakers like William James, Jane Addams, Julia Ward Howe among others. She had Dr. Lewis G Janes, president of Brooklyn Ethical Association working as her secretary to promote the Cambridge Conference and also further the cause of Greenacre Conference. She had a close relationship with Sarah Farmer who was a founder of the Greenacre Conference for promoting inter faith harmony and universal tolerance. She financially helped Ms. Farmer in furthering the cause of the Greenacre conference even though later they had apparent disagreement over Ms. Farmer's inclination towards occultism.

Sara had not been well for several years before her death and during these later years, she became influenced by the Rajah Yogi Indian sect. According to Pravrajika Prabuddhaprana, her biographer, she did not come under the influence of any other sect other than her allegiance to the Vedanta philosophy as she had hated sectarianism and occultism throughout her life. So the Rajah Yogi sect may have been a reference to the Vedanta Society established by Swami Vivekananda as he wrote the book titled Raja Yoga. She died in 1911 at her home at 168 Brattle Street in Cambridge. Funeral service was held at the home of E. A. Grosser where her husband's compositions, "Adagio Religiose" and "Saterdesog" were played. She was interred at Mount Auburn Cemetery.

Sara left almost her entire estate, valued at approximately US$500,000, to the Vedanta Society. Her daughter challenged the will, went to court to have it annulled. The grounds were insanity because of "undue influence" with the main argument being made by her attorney that "Hindus had driven Mrs. Bull insane"; The New York Times calling the trial "one of the strangest cases in the history of will contests in this country". There was a settlement mostly favourable to Bull's daughter. However, she died on the day of the settlement. The findings of the civil trial were also not in favour of the defendants. Saint Sara: The Life of Sara Chapman Bull, the American Mother of Swami Vivekananda, by Prabuddhaprana, was published in Calcutta in 2002. According to her biographer the servants of the household testified in favor of her daughter Olea's contest in return for monetary favor.

== Partial works ==
- 1876, The Pilot and His Wife: A Norse Love Story (with Jonas Lie)
- 1879, The Barque Future; or, Life in the Far North (with Jonas Lie)
- 1882, Ole Bull: A Memoir; with Ole Bull's Violin Notes and A.B. Crosby's Anatomy of the Violinist
- 1888, Leif Erikson
