= The East and the West =

- Front cover of 1971 edition
- Author: Swami Vivekananda
- Language: Bengali; English
- Published: 1909
- Publisher: Vedanta Society, New York, Udbodhan
- Publication place: India; United States
- Media type: Print

The East and the West or Prachya o Paschatya is a book written by Swami Vivekananda. In this book Swami Vivekananda made a comparative study of eastern and Western cultures.

== Synopsis ==
The book is divided into six chapters (excluding introduction).

1. Introduction
2. Customs: Eastern and Western
3. Food and cooking
4. Civilisation in dress
5. Etiquette and manners
6. France — Paris
7. Progress in Civilisation

Vivekananda told the culture, the social customs of India is quite different from the Western countries. He claimed that religion (dharma) is the foundation of India.

== Publication ==
This writing was first published in 1900–01 in the magazine Udbodhan in two different issues. Later in 1909, the writing was published as a book by the Vedanta Society in New York City.
