= Swami Yogananda =

Indian philosopher (1861–1899)

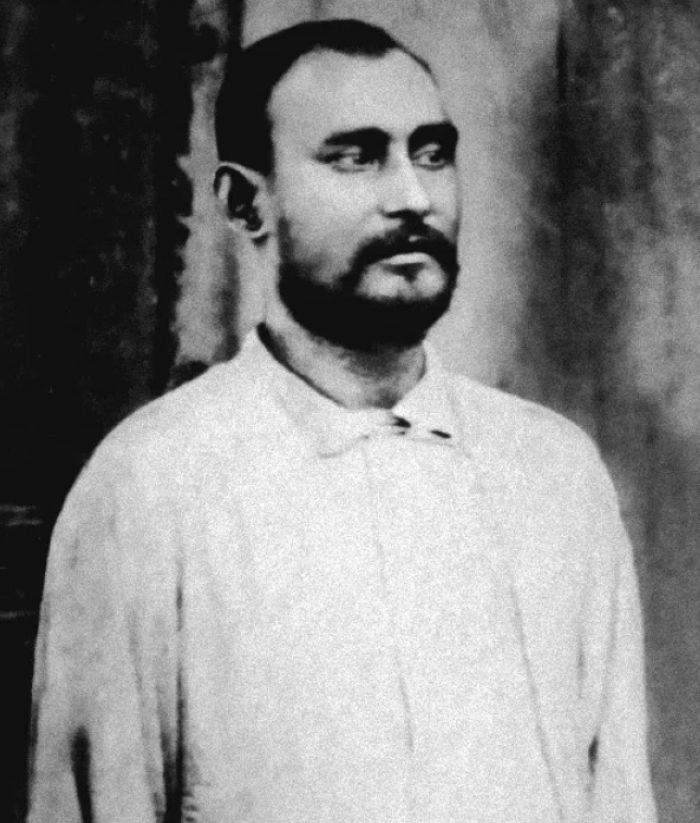
- Swami Yogananda, a direct monastic disciple of Ramakrishna and the first vice-president of Ramakrishna Mission

Personal life
- Born: Yogindra Nath Choudhury; 30 March 1861 Calcutta, Bengal Presidency, British India
- Died: 28 March 1899 (aged 37) Calcutta, Bengal Presidency, British India

Religious life
- Religion: Hinduism
- Philosophy: Advaita Vedanta

Religious career
- Teacher: Ramakrishna

Swami Yogananda (Bengali: স্বামী যোগানন্দ, romanized: Sbāmī Yōgānanda) was a disciple of Ramakrishna Paramahansa, the 19th-century mystic. He took his formal initiation from Sarada Devi, the "holy mother" of Ramakrishna paramhansa Order and spiritual consort of Ramakrishna. He was the first vice-president of Ramakrishna Mission. He belonged to the family of Sabarna Roy Choudhury, an aristocratic family of erstwhile Bengal. He had a very short life, but he played a very important role during the formative years of Ramakrishna Mission. He was also a dedicated and devoted attendant to Sarada Devi during her stay in Calcutta after Ramakrishna paramhangsha's death. He was one of the disciples whom Ramakrishna paramhangsha referred to as "Iswarakoti" or the "ever perfect soul".

== Biography ==
=== Pre-monastic life ===
Yogindranath Roy Choudhury was the eldest son of Navin Chandra Choudhury and was born near Dakshineswar village on 30 March 1861. Navin Chandra was a poor descendant of the local aristocrat Sabarna Roy Choudhury family, who once owned the present metropolis of Kolkata and its adjoins. Yogindranath was contemplative in nature from his childhood. He was simple in his habit and did not hanker after any luxury. He spent much of his time in meditation and worship. Yogin met Ramakrishna when he was seventeen years of age. He was then studying for his school-leaving examination, then under the University of Calcutta. Ramakrishna recognised the spiritual potentiality of Yogin and asked him to come more often, which impacted his studies and made his parents, who had high aspirations about him, concerned. To financially help his parents, he went to Kanpur in search of a job, as one of his relatives stayed there. However, he was unsuccessful in getting employment and instead devoted his time to a contemplative life. He shunned the company of people. Therefore, his parents decided to marry him off, in order that he might resume the life of a householder and take more responsibility.

=== Influence of Ramakrishna ===
After his marriage, Yogin met Ramakrishna again when the latter called him, and he once again began to frequent Dakshineswar to further his spiritual aspirations. Even after his marriage, Yogin was indifferent to worldly affairs, and hence that became the prime focus of the teaching of Ramakrishna towards him. Once, when Yogin bought a faulty cooking pan from market by trusting the shopkeeper, he was severely reprimanded by his master. Another time, Ramakrishna rebuked him when he heard that Yogin had not protested against a group of fellow passengers on a boat when they maligned Ramakrishna. On another occasion he asked Yogin to return the goods bought from a shop which had given him lesser quantity. This was a part of Ramakrishna's method to develop his disciples holistically, as he often said, "A man may aspire to be religious, but he need not be a fool."

Yogin also tested Ramakrishna in his own way as he was critical and analytical in nature, but every time he was proved wrong and these incidents finally established his unwavering faith on his master. Afterwards when Ramakrishna was ill, he was one of the regular attendants by his bedside.

=== Influence of Sarada Devi ===
After the death of Ramakrishna, Yogin accompanied the widow Sarada Devi, the holy mother and spiritual consort of Ramakrishna, to Vrindaban. There he was initiated by her in Kalababu's Kunja, an ashrama established by Balaram Bose, a householder devotee of Ramakrishna, and thus he became the first disciple of Sarada Devi. After coming back to Bengal he became an attendant to the holy mother and her women disciples, including Yogin Ma and Golap Ma. He accompanied Sarada Devi to Puri along with Swami Brahmananda and looked after her when she stayed in various places in Calcutta, from 1888 to 1899. Sarada Devi used to call him affectionately as "Chhele Yogen" or the "boy Yogen".

=== Monastic life ===
Yogin took the monastic vow along with his other brother disciples under the leadership of Swami Vivekananda in 1887, and took the name "Swami Yogananda" (Yoga – communion (with God), ananda – bliss), signifying his love for contemplation and meditation. He traveled to Varanasi in 1891 and stayed in a solitary garden house, living an austere life. His health broke down with the severe strain of the austerities and spiritual practices, and he came back to Calcutta, to the newly formed Baranagar Math. He was at this stage permanently sick, suffering from stomach related ailments. He stayed in the house of Balaram Bose, a householder devotee, and he was engaged to serve the holy mother devotedly when she was staying in the same house in Calcutta. At this stage he inducted young men to the Ramakrishna order and attracted others to the ideology.

=== Activities and organizational skills ===
Yogananda was the first to organise the public celebration of Ramakrishna's birthday anniversary on a large scale in Dakshineswar temple premises. Yogananda was also instrumental in providing a grand reception to Swami Vivekananda when he returned to Calcutta in 1897. On both occasions he influenced many young men and organised and coordinated the activities. Yogananda was elected as the vice-president of the Ramakrishna Mission upon its formation in 1897, and he successfully steered the organisation through its formative years. In 1898 Yogananda organised the birthday anniversary of Ramakrishna in the newly formed Belur Math. He served as the office bearer till his death in 1899.

=== Death ===
Yogananda died on 28 March 1899 after prolonged illness. He was the first to pass away among the direct monastic disciples of Ramakrishna and Sarada Devi. During his illness he was served by Kalyanananda, a direct disciple of Vivekananda. Sister Nivedita was one of the witnesses to his death, and she had described the moments of his death in one of her letters to Josephine MacLeod. During his last days he was nursed by Yogin Ma and his death affected Sarada Devi.

=== Character and legacy ===
While soft-spoken and gentle, he was strong and independent minded. He was often direct with his criticisms, and in this matter he did not even spare Vivekananda. When the latter introduced the ideology of selfless philanthropic work, Yogananda objected to the concept because, according to him, it was not in tune with the ideology put forward by Ramakrishna. His contention was that the energy of a monk should be spent wholly for the perusal of spiritual practices. However he loved and respected his leader and hence these incidents never became a bone of contention. He respected and admired Sarada Devi, whom he served devotedly whenever she was in Calcutta. Despite his preference for a contemplative life, he had great organizational skills. Thus, he formed a deep impression on many young generation monks of the Ramakrishna Order.

The buildings and dormitories of residential schools under Ramakrishna Mission are named after the direct disciples of Sri Ramakrishna and in many cases other monks also.
