= Mukti Ebang Tahar Sadhan =

- Author: Bipin Bihari Ghoshal
- Language: Bengali
- Subject: Vedanta, Hinduism
- Publisher: Udbodhan
- Publication place: India

Mukti Ebang Tahar Sadhan or Mukti Ebam Tahar Sadhan is a Bengali spiritual book compiled by Bipin Bihari Ghoshal. The book was first published in 1288 Bengali year. Ramakrishna used to recommend young devotees to read this book. In 1986 Udbodhan publication republished this book.
