= Gopaler Ma =

- গোপালের মা
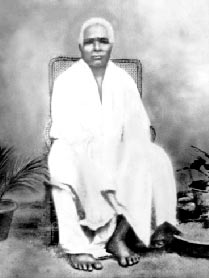
- Gopaler Ma, the devotee of Sri Ramakrishna, who had visions of Gopala or baby Krishna in Sri Ramakrishna
- Born: Aghoremani Devi; 1822; Kamarhati, Calcutta, Bengal Presidency, British India
- Died: 8 July 1906; Calcutta, Bengal Presidency, British India
- Other name: Kamarhatir Brahmani
- Citizenship: India
- Occupation: Housewife
- Known for: Spiritual devotion

Gopaler Ma (translation: Mother of Gopala, an epithet for Sri Krishna; 1822 – 8 July 1906) was a devotee and a householder disciple of Sri Ramakrishna, the saint and mystic from Bengal. Her birth name was Aghoremani Devi, but she came to be known as Gopaler Ma among the devotees of Sri Ramakrishna, owing to her intense motherly love for Sri Ramakrishna as "Gopala" or baby Krishna. She was famous for her divine visions of Lord Krishna as a baby and her devotion to the ideals of Sri Ramakrishna. In her later years, she was very close to Swami Vivekananda and Sister Nivedita. She spent the last few years of her life with Sister Nivedita.

== Early life ==
Aghoremani Devi was born of a Brahmin family in the year 1822 in the village called Kamarhati near Calcutta. According to the then prevailing customs, she was married when she was only nine years old but became a widow soon after her marriage, even before her marriage was consummated, when she was only fourteen years of age. As a widow she stayed in the house of Nilmadhav Bandopadhyaya, her brother, who was a priest in the temple of Krishna in Kamarhati. She was initiated into the spiritual life by the family guru of her husband's family and had the child Krishna as her personal deity. While frequenting the temple she was acquainted with the wife of Govinda Chandra Dutta, the proprietress, who provided her with a small room in the temple garden on the bank of the river Ganga. She sold her jewelry and husband's property and invested the sum of rupees five hundred and lived a simple and contemplative life on that small income of rupees four or five. She spent next thirty years of her life in that small room and led a very austere life. Her daily routine consisted of waking up at two in the morning, completing the ablutions and continuing spiritual practices till eight in the morning. She would then work in the adjacent temple of Krishna, also called the temple of Radha Madhava. Her entire day was spent in spiritual practices in some form or another through meditation, japam or repetition of the sacred mantra, and service to her chosen ideal of baby Krishna. She followed this routine from 1852 to about 1883. In the evening she would attend the vesper service in the temple and partake a simple meal after due offering to her Ideal according to the customs, and continued with her spiritual practices till midnight. She stayed in the South West corner of the garden house. The only break from her routine austere practices and penance was her travel to the holy places of Mathura, Vrindavan, Gaya, Varanasi and Allahabad with the landlady.

== Meeting Sri Ramakrishna ==
She first met Sri Ramakrishna in the year 1884 when she traveled to Dakshineswar temple with her landlady. Every time she visited him, the saint requested her to bring along some cooked dishes, which initially made her skeptic. Sri Ramakrishna also visited the temple in Govinda Dutta's garden and participated in the holy festival that was organized.

=== Divine visions and ecstasies ===
One night, in the spring of 1885, while performing her usual spiritual practices, Gopaler Ma had a vision of Sri Ramakrishna which changed into that of a ten-month-old baby. In her ecstatic state she perceived that the baby boy, whom she called as Gopala, was acting like her child, playing with her and demanding food and attention from her. She went to meet Sri Ramakrishna the very next day, in whom she saw the embodiment of her divine vision and whom she regarded as her child Gopala. According to the eyewitness account, she was mad with a divine ecstasy and joy. She fed Sri Ramakrishna, who was also in an ecstatic mood. She stayed in Dakshineswar that day and went back home in the evening. She had the uninterrupted vision of the chosen ideal for some more time. The baby Krishna played, threw tantrums and went everywhere that she went. The visions went on for two months. There were distinct changes in her behavioral pattern, as she became restless for the visions when the initial frenzy had subsided. Sri Ramakrishna finally told her that she attained the goal of her spiritual practices. After that, her divine visions ceased.

=== Divine visions explained ===
The divine visions of Gopaler Ma, which are similar in nature to visions and ecstasies of the mystics around the world, irrespective of their religious affiliations, have been explained in an account of Gopaler Ma, that the rational explanation for such divine visions are that there are finer states of consciousness, which are breached when the mind is pure and tranquil. With the degree of purity achieved by Gopaler Ma through her spiritual practices, she could enter into that realm of super consciousness available only to the mystics around the world. In this realm of mystical experience, verbal expression, mental cognition, and intellectual reasoning do not function. The only consciousness is the direct consciousness of God.

=== Relationship as a devotee ===
Once when she had accepted some gifts from a devotee family of Balaram Bose, Sri Ramakrishna had rebuked her, maintaining that renunciation is the greatest virtue of a devotee. Sri Ramakrishna also fed her and Narendranath Dutta (later Swami Vivekananda) with the offerings from certain sections of the devotees which he did not consider as fit for eating for other devotees, because he considered her to be pure enough to partake those offerings.

Gopaler Ma, upon advice from Sri Ramakrishna, shared her visions with Narendranath Dutta (Swami Vivekananda), who was a skeptic and a disbeliever in God with form, owing to his affiliation with Brahmo Samaj. However, on hearing her account, young Narendranath was moved, and when asked by her as to whether her visions were true, he maintained that those were true. Swami Vivekananda had a very lofty opinion about the devotion of Gopaler Ma, and he even told his American and English disciples, that Gopaler Ma represented an era of ancient Indian ideals of purity and devotion which was fast disappearing. She also finds mention in several places in The Gospel of Sri Ramakrishna. At one place in the Gospel, Sri Ramakrishna himself talks about her divine visions.

Gopaler Ma maintained a very close relationship with Sri Ramakrishna till the latter left his mortal coils in 1886. She also had a very close relationship with the Holy Mother Sri Sarada Devi, whom she referred to as "Bouma", meaning the daughter-in-law in Bengali. She had a special relationship with Swami Vivekananda, whom she referred to as "Naren". Swami Vivekananda had sent two women disciples to her for initiation. Sister Nivedita in a letter equated her with some of leading Christian mystics like St. Elizabeth and believed that she was a 'fully liberated soul' (Paramhansa)

== Aftermath ==
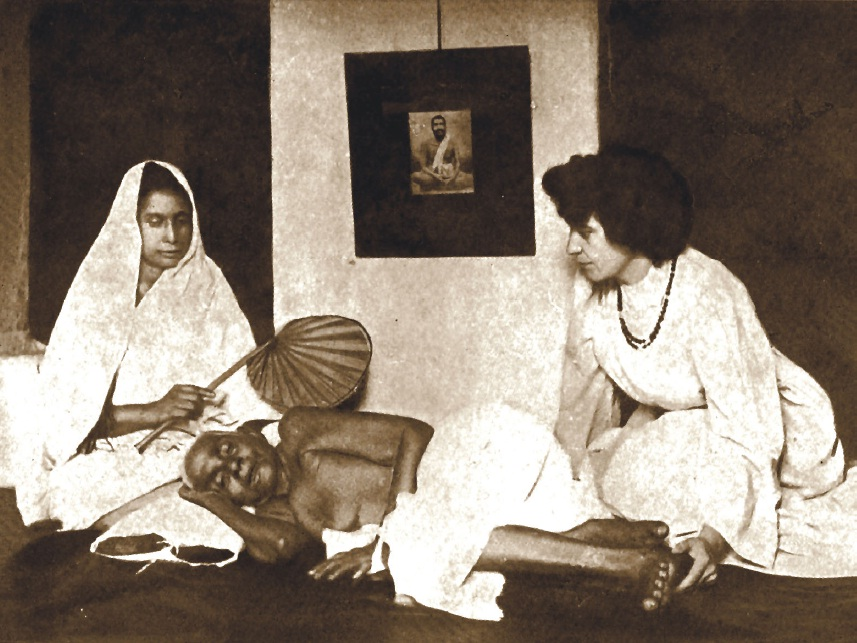
Gopaler Ma in deathbed, in the house of Sister Nivedita, also seen are Sister Nivedita (right) and Kusum, her disciple

After the death of Sri Ramakrishna in 1886, Gopaler Ma used to visit the Baranagar Math and Alambazar Math, but generally stayed in her room in the garden house and continued her spiritual practices. In 1887, she, though devoid of conventional education, had surprised the devotees in the house of Balaram Bose in 1887, when she responded to their queries on abstract spiritual ideas. She claimed that the responses came from Gopala.

She even had a vision of Sri Ramkrishna during the Rathayatra festival of Lord Jagannath in Mahesh, when she saw her chosen ideal in the chariot, in the idol of Lord Jagannath and in the surrounding crowd.

She entertained the American friends and disciples of Swami Vivekananda, like Josephine MacLeod and Sara Bull, when they visited her. She did not speak English, but expressed her affection for the foreign devotees through nonverbal gestures like holding the hand and stroking them. She had special feelings for Sister Nivedita and formed a bond of affection with her. She had at least one disciple, Kusumkumari Devi, a widow, who stayed with her and nursed her during her illness. She was taken ill in 1903 and Sister Nivedita took her to her place in Bosepara Lane, where she stayed for the remaining period of her life. She died on 8 July 1906 on the bank of the Ganga, in the presence of Sister Nivedita and Sri Sarada Devi, who attended to her before her death.

She considered herself as a Sanyasini nun during the last ten or twelve years before she died and always wore an ochre cloth, the symbol of renunciation in Hinduism.

== Contributions ==
Aghoremani Devi was a householder disciple, but was a famous name in the Ramakrishna Order and had a very important role to play in the early history of the Ramakrishna movement. The stories of her divine visions and her unique spiritual practices, her purity and consequent enlightenment, was a source of inspiration to many devotees in the order. She was very close to Sister Nivedita and despite being an orthodox Brahmin widow, her liberal behavior against the prevailing dogmas of the society helped the movement, esp. its foreign adherents, to gain universal acceptance among the orthodox Hindu community.

Before she died, she bequeathed her only possessions, a photograph of Sri Ramakrishna, and about two hundred rupees, to Belur Math, for the service of the God.

== Religious outlook ==
Aghoremani Devi was a strict orthodox Hindu according to the customs. She was conservative and was extremely meticulous about preserving the purity of her life and ideals. Swami Saradananda in his book, Sri Ramakrishna Leela Prasanga (Ramakrishna, the Great master) emphasizes this point by narrating an incident. As a devotee of Sri Ramakrishna, when Gopaler Ma was serving rice to the latter, he accidentally touched the stick with which rice was stirred in the pot. Aghoremani did not touch the remaining rice and also threw away the stick. Before preparing the food for Gopaler Ma, Sri Sarada Devi had to purify the hearth several times. However, as she became closer to Sri Ramakrishna and his devotee circle, her orthodox manners and customs reduced appreciably. She grew less fastidious about the preparation of food and the custom of cleanliness to preserve external purity. Her caste prejudices disappeared. In her later years, she had no problem in treating as guests the American disciples of Swami Vivekananda, going against the prevalent customs. Later she could even receive a foreigner like Sister Nivedita and live with her till her end.

== External sources ==
- They Lived with God, by Swami Chetanananda, published by Vedanta Society of St. Louis
- Death of Gopaler Ma
- Gopaler Ma – Biography [this link is hacked; it is taking me to some other website - Aug 2020]
