= Kamarpukur =

- village
- Location in West Bengal, India Kamarpukur (India)
- Coordinates: 22.91°N 87.65°E
- Country: India
- State: West Bengal
- District: Hooghly District

Government
  - Body: Municipality

Population (2011)
  - Total: 3,121

Languages
  - Official: Bengali, English
- Time zone: UTC+5:30 (IST)
- PIN: 712612
- Telephone code: 03211
- ISO 3166 code: IN-WB
- Website: https://kamarpukurjayrambati.com/

Kamarpukur is a town in the Goghat II CD block in the Arambag subdivision of the Hooghly District in West Bengal state of India. It is the birthplace of Sri Ramakrishna. It is the block headquarters of the Goghat –II community development block.

== Geography ==
Cities and towns in Arambagh subdivision in Hooghly district
M: municipal city/ town, R: rural/ urban centre, H: historical/ religious centre
Owing to space constraints in the small map, the actual locations in a larger map may vary slightly

=== Location ===
Kamarpukur is located at 22.91°N 87.65°E.

=== Area overview ===
The Arambagh subdivision, presented in the map alongside, is divided into two physiographic parts – the Dwarakeswar River being the dividing line. The western part is upland and rocky – it is extension of the terrain of neighbouring Bankura district. The eastern part is flat alluvial plain area. The railways, the roads and flood-control measures have had an impact on the area. The area is overwhelmingly rural with 94.77% of the population living in rural areas and 5.23% of the population living in urban areas.

Note: The map alongside presents some of the notable locations in the subdivision. All places marked in the map are linked in the larger full screen map.

=== Around Kamarpukur ===
A mile to the north of Kamarpukur, is situated the village of Harishova or Bhursubo where a well-to-do person named Manik Raja lived. The renowned tanks of Sukhasayer and Hatisayer excavated by him as also the mango-grove now almost extinct in the nearby meadows, testify to some of his noteworthy acts.

On the western border of Kamarpukur, the canal Bhutir-Khal flows in a zigzag course from north to south and joins the Amodar River at a little distance.

Two cremation grounds called Budhui Moral and Bhutir-Khal lie on the north-east and north-west of the village respectively. Along the eastern border of the village a spacious road runs from Burdwan (32 miles from Kamarpukur) to Puri in Orissa.

To the south-east are the ruins of Gar Mandaran and the ancient temple of Saileswara Shiva, which bear witness to the prosperous days of the Pathan rulers.

About 30 miles to the east, is the temple of Tarakeswar Shiva, which is connected with Kamarpukur by a road running via Jahanabad (or Arambagh). Besides this, Ghatal (18 miles to the south) and Vishnupur (30 miles to the west) are joined with Kamarpukur by another road that abuts on the aforesaid road to Puri, after passing through the village via Kotulpur and Koalpara.

Three miles to the west, is Jayrambati, the village in which the Holy Mother Sri Sarada Devi was born.

Goghat-II CD block map showing GP areas

Kamarkupur gram panchayat (GP) is a constituent GP of Goghat–II community development block in Arambag subdivision of the Hooghly district. Kamarkupur will be soon a Municipality town which was announced by finance minister of West Bengal Government during Budget session of 2026-27. It will be second Municipality in the sub division and first in Goghat Thana(Police Station) area. Kamarpukur Municipality will be set up soon.

== History ==
A number of ponds, tanks, old buildings, and dilapidated temples still bear witness to its ancient prosperity. In its olden days Kamarpukur was surrounded by extensive fields, and looked like an island floating in a vast sea of green. Apart from agriculture, it was noted for cottage industries also. Sweetmeats like jilapi and nabat, hookah pipes of ebony, yarns, towels, and cloth, were prepared here and sent out for sale to Kolkata and nearby markets. To this day, in the month of Chaitra (March—April), Kamarpukur reverberates with songs during the worship of Goddess Manasa and the festival of Shiva, and in the following month, devotional choral songs of Hari are sung for three days at a stretch.

=== Ramakrishna ===
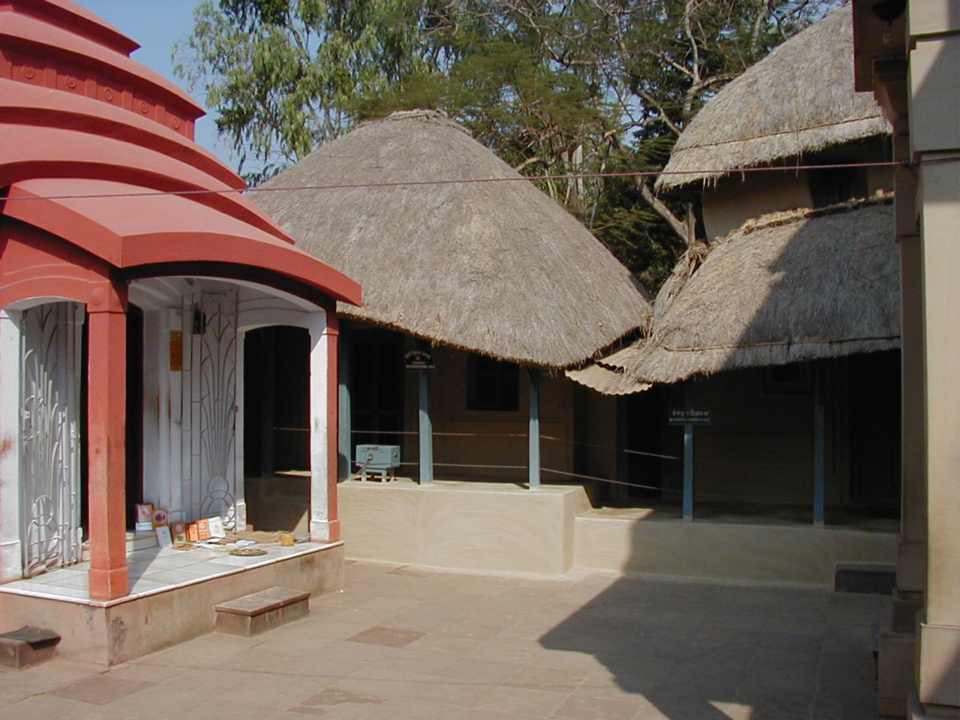
The small house at Kamarpukur where Ramakrishna lived (centre). The family shrine is on the left, birthplace temple on the extreme right

It was at Kamarpukur that Sri Ramakrishna Paramahamsa was born in 1836 in a poor Brahmin family. With his advent and on account of the frequent visits of his disciples and devotees, this hamlet has become a place of pilgrimage. Thousands visit it every year from the various parts of the world.

Through the help of the devotees and the management, and of the monks of the Ramakrishna Math and Ramakrishna Mission, the temple of Bhagavan Sri Ramakrishna, with his marble statue installed in it, was built in 1951 at Kamarpukur. Later developments include the construction of guest houses, a library, a dispensary, and schools and the re-excavation of the tank called Haldarpukur.

Vishalakshi Temple - Situated at Anur, around 2 km from Kamarpukur, goddess Vishalakshi is a popular deity. People vow offerings to the goddess with the hope that the goddess will fulfil their desire. Not very long ago the goddess resided under the open sky at the place where the present temple is situated. Villagers were used to construct an ordinary leafy shed every year before the Makar Sankranti (Mid-January) when a fair was organised. The tradition of the fair is being followed until today. One anecdote, associated with goddess Vishalakshi, states that Gadadhar (Sri Ramakrishna in his childhood) was accompanying a group of pious ladies in their way to offer worship to goddess Vishalakshi. When he was singing the glory of goddess Vishalakshi, suddenly his body became stiff and tears flowed down his cheeks. Seeing these ladies realised that it might be due to the mystic influence of the goddess on the simple-hearted child. They immediately started praying to goddess Vishalakshi to save Gadadhar. Wonder! Gadadhar woke up with a brightened face.

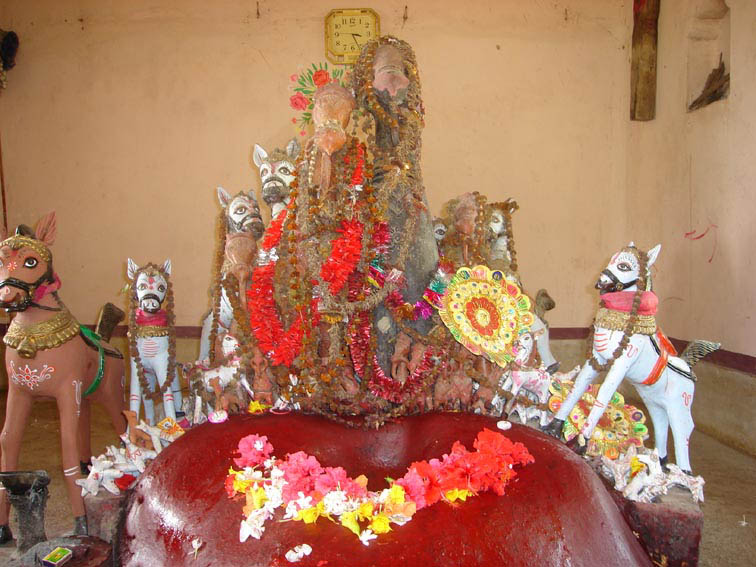
Goddess Vishalakshi at Anur

== Demographics ==
According to the 2011 Census of India, Kamarpukur had a total population of 3,121 of which 1,592 (51%) were males and 1,529 (49%) were females. Population in the age range 0–6 years was 285. The total number of literate persons in Kamarpukur was 2,530 (89.21% of the population over 6 years).

== Civic administration ==
=== CD block HQ ===
The headquarters of Goghat II CD block are located at Kamarpukur.

== Education ==
- Sri Ramkrishna Sarada Vidyamahapith, a general degree college, was established at Kamarpukur in 1959, under the auspices of a trustee board – Anur Janasiksha Sansad. It is affiliated with the University of Burdwan. It offers honours courses in Bengali, English, Sanskrit, history, economics, philosophy, political science, physics, chemistry, mathematics and computer science.
- Ramakrishna Mission Multipurpose School, Kamarpukur a secondary boys' school in Westbengal.
- Nayantara Girls School is a Higher secondary school and
- St. Tomas Public School is an upper primary school

== Transport ==
The State Highway 7 (West Bengal) passes through Kamarpukur. Those wanting to visit Kamapukur from Howrah can take a train to Goghat, next stop after Arambagh. Frequent bus services available for Tarakeswar, Ghatal, Chandrakona, Bishnupur etc. Local on hire vehicles are available for reaching Kamarpukur
