= Yogin Ma =

Disciple of Hindu mystic Sarada Devi (1851–1924)

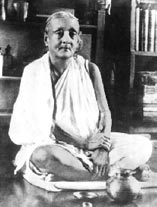
- Born: Yogindra Mohini Biswas; 16 January 1851; Calcutta, Bengal Presidency, Company Raj
- Died: 4 June 1924 (aged 73) Calcutta, Bengal Presidency, British India

Yogin Ma (Bengali: যোগীন মা) (16 January 1851 - 4 June 1924), born Yogindra Mohini Biswas, was one of the principal female disciples of Sarada Devi, the wife and spiritual consort of the Hindu mystic Ramakrishna. Together with Gopaler Ma, she was a constant companion of Sarada Devi, revered as the holy mother in the monastic order of Ramakrishna.

Yogin Ma was a major witness and an active contributor to the early formation of the order. She stayed with the Sarada Devi in the Udbodhan House in Calcutta, which was built by Swami Saradananda for the use of Sarada Devi.

== Biography ==
=== Early life ===
Yogin Ma was born as Yogindra Mohini Biswas in Calcutta on 16 January 1851 to Prasanna Kumar Mitra, a successful physician. She was given in marriage to Ambika Charan Biswas at the age of six or seven, as it was the prevailing custom in Bengal to marry off girls at an early age. Her husband squandered all his wealth and, despite her best attempts of rehabilitating and reforming him, became a habitual drunkard. Yogin Ma finally left her husband's place with her only daughter and took shelter with her widowed mother in her father's house in Bagbazar area of Calcutta.

=== Spiritual awakening ===
Adversity propelled her to develop intense yearning for God Realization and a chance encounter with Ramakrishna, the 19th century mystic saint of Bengal, changed her life. In 1882, Yogin Ma first met Ramakrishna in the house of Balaram Bose, who was a great devotee. After a few meetings in Dakshineswar, Ramakrishna initiated her and became her Guru and mentor. Yogin Ma first met Ramakrishna's wife and spiritual consort Sarada Devi in Dakshineswar, in the building of Nahabat, where Sarada Devi stayed. By staying as a close companion of Sarada Devi, Yogin Ma had recorded and shared some of her day-to-day experiences, which serves as an important testimony to the early life and the spiritual practices of Sarada Devi during her stay in Dakshineswar. She recounted many incidents of her life during this period - her travels to Vrindavan after Ramakrishna's demise, her travels to Puri and stay in Calcutta in several of her devotees' house, including that of Balaram Bose.

Life lived by Ramakrishna and Sarada Devi inspired Yogin Ma to practise spiritual disciplines, and lead a holy and pure life like a nun. She also studied the scriptures, esp. the Ramayana and Mahabharata and the Puranas. Thus, later in her life she was able to help Sister Nivedita in writing one of her famous books, "The Cradle Tales of Hinduism" . Ramakrishna had acknowledged her spiritual prowess by predicting that, "She is not an ordinary flower that will blossom quickly, she is a thousand-petalled lotus that will open slowly."

When Ramakrishna died on 16 August 1886, Yogin Ma was in Vrindaban. There she was joined by Sarada Devi of whom she later became a lifelong companion. Sarada Devi used to call her "Meye Yogen" or "lady Yogen", for distinguishing her from Swami Yogananda, who was also known as "Yogen". Her daughter Ganu died and she was left with three grandsons who were brought up under the tutelage of Swami Saradananda, and at least one of them later joined the order and was initiated by Sarada Devi.

=== Character ===
Yogin-ma was a woman of strong determination. Whatever she undertook, she carried through to perfection. Yogin-ma looked on the monastic disciples as her own children and they, including Swami Vivekananda in turn, were very free with her. She was an expert cook, and Vivekananda often requested her to prepare a meal for him. The American disciple of Swami Paramananda, sister Devmata recollects about her, "Yogin-ma always seemed to me one of the noblest of Ramakrishna's disciples… She did not abandon her householder life, but no nun in a cloister was more rigid in her spiritual observance than she… No service was ever omitted, no care neglected." Her life was very austere, and she accompanied Sarada Devi in performing the 'Austerity of the Five Fires', considered as a very sacred and dangerous ritual.

=== Later life ===
She later came back to Calcutta along with Sarada Devi and often stayed with her in Udbodhan House in Calcutta. Toward the end of her life, Yogin Ma took the final monastic vows according to the Vedic tradition from Swami Saradananda. Baburam Maharaj (Swami Premananda) was also present at the ceremony. She died on 4 June 1924, at the Udbodhan House, at the age of seventy-three.
