= Udbodhan =

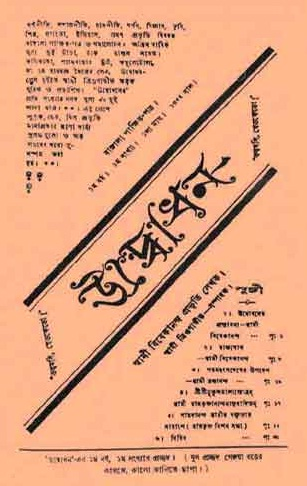
- Udbodhan 1899 first issue front page
- Publisher: Ramakrishna Math
- Founder: Vivekananda
- Founded: January 1899
- Country: India
- Based in: 1 Udbodhan Lane, Bagbazar, Kolkata-- 700003
- Language: Bengali
- Website: www.udbodhan.org

Udbodhan is the only Bengali publication of the Ramakrishna Math and Ramakrishna Mission, started by Vivekananda in January 1899, with Trigunatitananda as its founding editor Over the years, it also grew into a publishing house, and remained one of the leading publishers of literature of Ramakrishna and Vivekananda.

Library facilities, reading and lending books are available at Udbodhan office. The collection varies from history, culture, the Vedas, the Upanishads to adventures.

== History ==
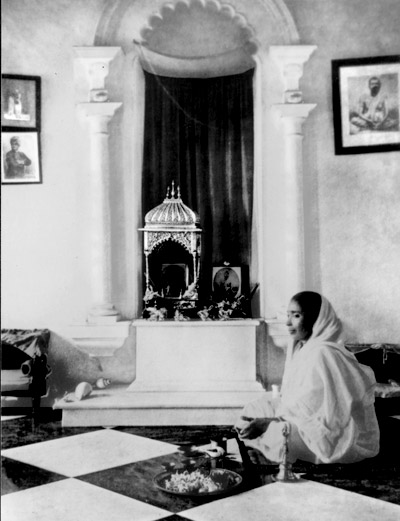
Sarada Devi worshiping at her Udbodhan residence in Calcutta.

Before the publication of Udbodhan, the Brahmavadin and Prabuddha Bharata were being published from Madras under Vivekananda's inspiration, but these were not the official journals of the Ramakrishna Order. It was only later that the Prabuddha Bharata was taken over by Ramakrishna Mission and published first from Almora, then from Mayavati, and now from Kolkata.

The construction of the present building was started by Saradananda, the then editor, in 1907, subsequently, the magazine shifted to the ground floor of the building while Sarada Devi, wife of Ramakrishna lived on upper floor

== Editors ==
- Trigunatitananda, founding editor
- Saradananda
- Ritananda
- Krishnanathananda (Present editor)

== Publications ==
- Karma Yoga
- Jnana Yoga
- Mukti Ebang Tahar Sadhan
