= Jayrambati =

Joyrambati
- Village
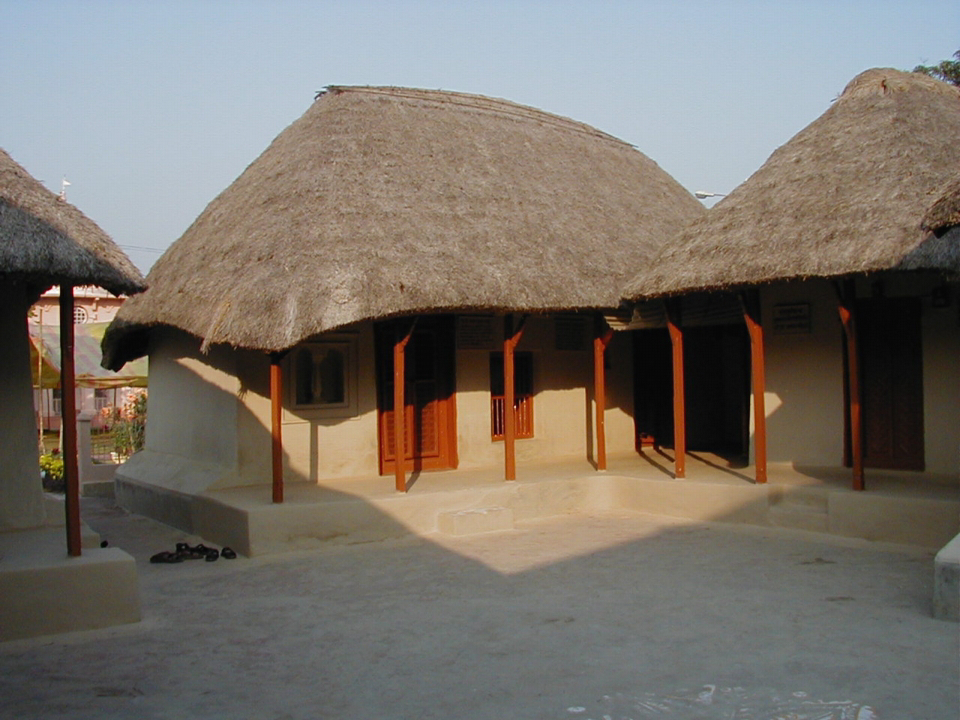
- Sarada Devi Jayrambati

- Location in West Bengal, India Joyrambati (India)
- Coordinates: 22.923°N 87.61°E
- Country: India
- State: West Bengal
- District: Bankura

Government
  - Body: Gram panchayat

Languages
  - Official: Bengali, English
- Time zone: UTC+5:30 (IST)
- PIN: 722161
- Telephone code: 03244
- Website: bankura.gov.in

Joyrambati is a village, in the jurisdiction of Kotulpur police station in the Bishnupur subdivision in Bankura district, West Bengal, India. Many devotees and pilgrims come here as it was the birthplace of Sri Sarada Devi , who was the wife of Sri Ramakrishna Paramhansa.

== Geography ==
Places in Bishnupur subdivision in Bankura district
M: Municipal town, CT: census town, R: rural/ urban centre, T: ancient/ temple centre
Owing to space constraints in the small map, the actual locations in a larger map may vary slightly

=== Location ===
Joyrambati is three miles to the west of Kamarpukur and two miles to the east of Shihar - the birthplace of Hridayrama Mukhopadhyaya, a nephew of Bhagwan Sri Ramakrishna Dev. Bishnupur and Arambag are twenty-seven miles and twelve miles distant respectively from Joyrambati.

The village, surrounded on all sides by green pastures, untrimmed meadows, trees and shrubs, has a rural atmosphere. The area that extends for about half a mile between this village and the Amodar is very fertile and yields all kinds of vegetables and other agricultural products.

=== Area overview ===
The map alongside shows the Bishnupur subdivision of Bankura district. Physiographically, this area has fertile low-lying alluvial plains. It is a predominantly rural area with 90.06% of the population living in rural areas and only 8.94% living in the urban areas. It was a part of the core area of Mallabhum.

Note: The map alongside presents some of the notable locations in the subdivision. All places marked in the map are linked in the larger full screen map.

== History ==
=== Peace and prosperity ===
After the birth of Holy Mother Sri Sarada Devi, who is worshipped as Holy Mother, the spiritual consort of Sri Ramakrishna, the village began to show signs of prosperity which was not so much in evidence before her advent. The main source of irrigation of the nearby cultivable lands is the big lake called 'Aher' or 'Mother's Tank' or 'Mayer Dighi'; where the visitors and the village-folks take their bath and get refreshed. It is said that the Holy Mother in her girlhood used to cut grass for cows in neck-deep water from this very tank. At present water is supplied to this reservoir from the river Amodar by means of an electric pump and is used for the irrigation of the surrounding fields.

There is another tank called 'Barujjey Pukur' (i.e. Banerji's tank) which lies on the south-eastern corner of this village and is surrounded with palmyra trees.

=== Birthplace of Sri Sarada Devi ===
Sri Sarada Devi was born in this village in 1853. This village with its sacred traditions has become a holy place of pilgrimage, particularly among followers of Sri Ramakrishna. On one occasion, the Holy Mother, after touching the dust of this place with her forehead, remarked, One's own mother and the land of birth are even far superior to Heaven.

=== Communication ===
Joyrambati can be reached from different directions such as [1] From Howrah by train up to Arambagh or Goghat Railway station and then by bus or car [2] From Kharagpur by bus via Kamarpukur [3] From Bishnupur by bus via Kotulpur or via Bakadah. One can also come by road directly from Kolkata-Arambagh-Joyrambati. Buses are available from Esplanade to Bishnupur via Joyrambati in its route.

=== Temples ===
The main temple of this village belongs to Ramakrishna Math and Mission, Belur Math, and named as "SRI SRI MATRI MANDIR" dedicated to Holy Mother Sri Sarada Devi, the spiritual consort of Sri Ramakrishna. The temple was constructed on the birthplace of Ma Sarada Devi.

The deity in the Sri Sri Matri Mandir is positioned exactly on the spot where Holy Mother Sri Sarada Devi was born on 22 December 1853.

The Holy Mother's Temple is consecrated on 19 April 1923 by Saradananda Swami on Akshay Tritiya day, and he placed Holy Mother's oil paintings in the temple which was replaced by a white marble statue of Holy Mother in April 1954.

The village hosts another temple of Vivekananda monks and the orphanage school for boys that the monks operate. The school hosts around 250 boys, providing them with an education through junior high. There is a temple called "Naranarayan Temple" where a child of below 5 years of age is worshipped as "God Narayan" at 10:00 A.M daily. This is a unique experiment started by Swami Nityanandaji Maharaj of Vivekananda Math to manifest the saying of "Shiva in Jiva". The offerings in this puja are unusual which suits the need of a child like, a pair of shirt and trouser, toys, books, pen and pencil, etc.

In nearby Shihar village there is an old temple dedicated to Shantinath Shiva. Both Sri Ramakrishna and the Holy Mother Sri Sarada Devi visited this temple. A grand fair is organized on the last of day of Chaitra (Bengali calendar) on the occasion of Gajan.

== Jayrambati picture gallery ==
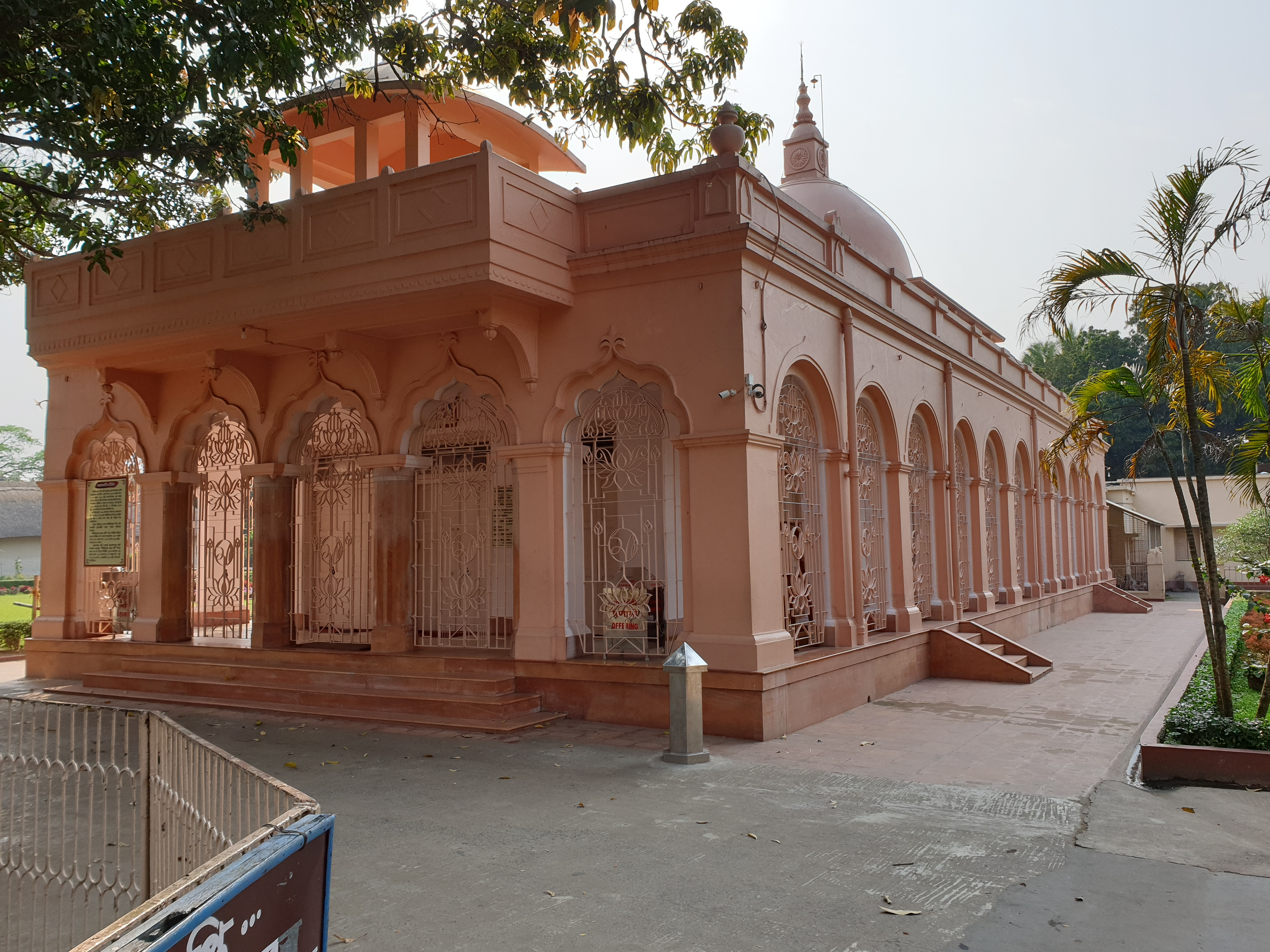
Sri Sri Matri Mandir, Joyrambati

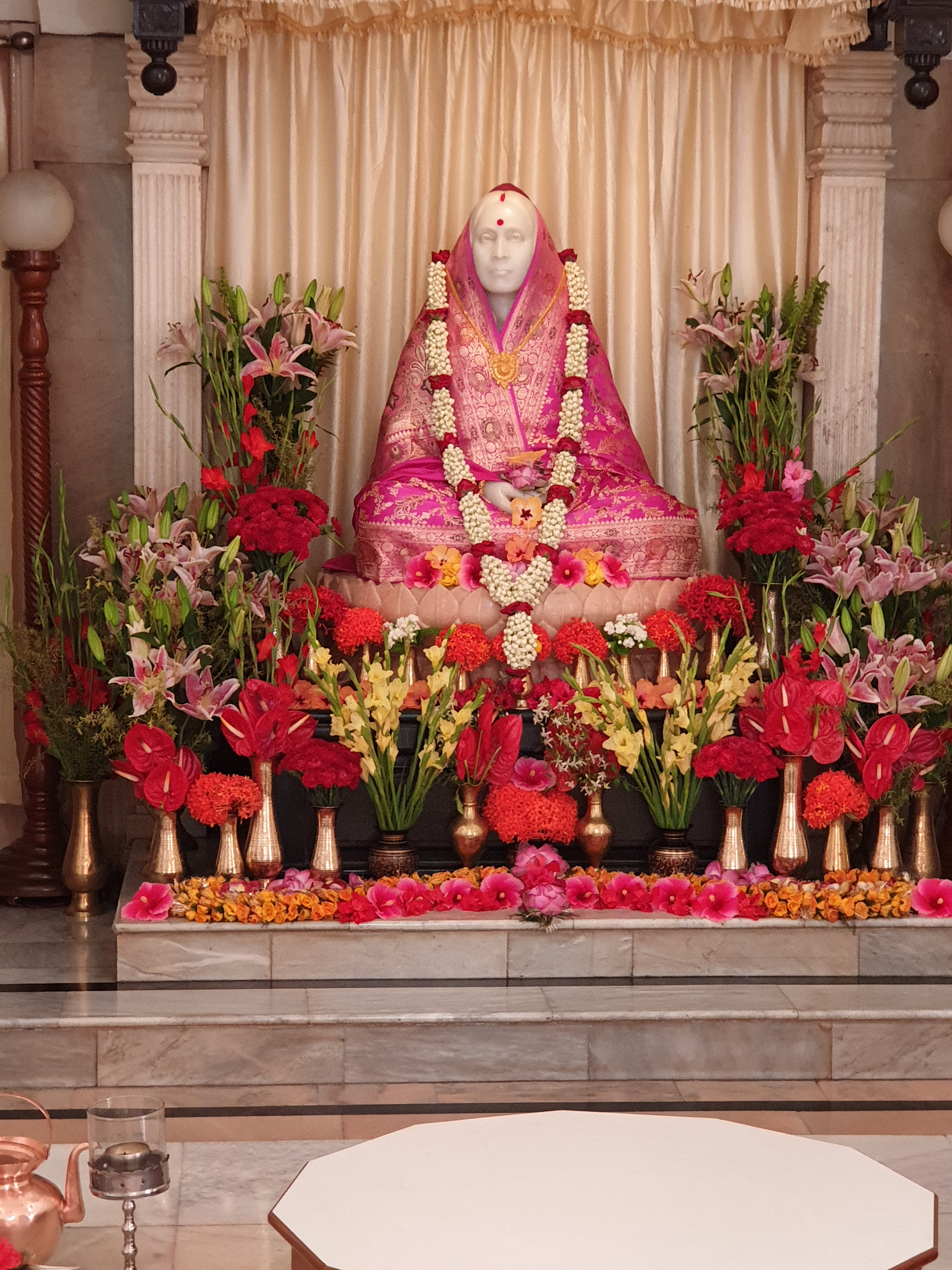
Sri Sri Maa Sarada Devi

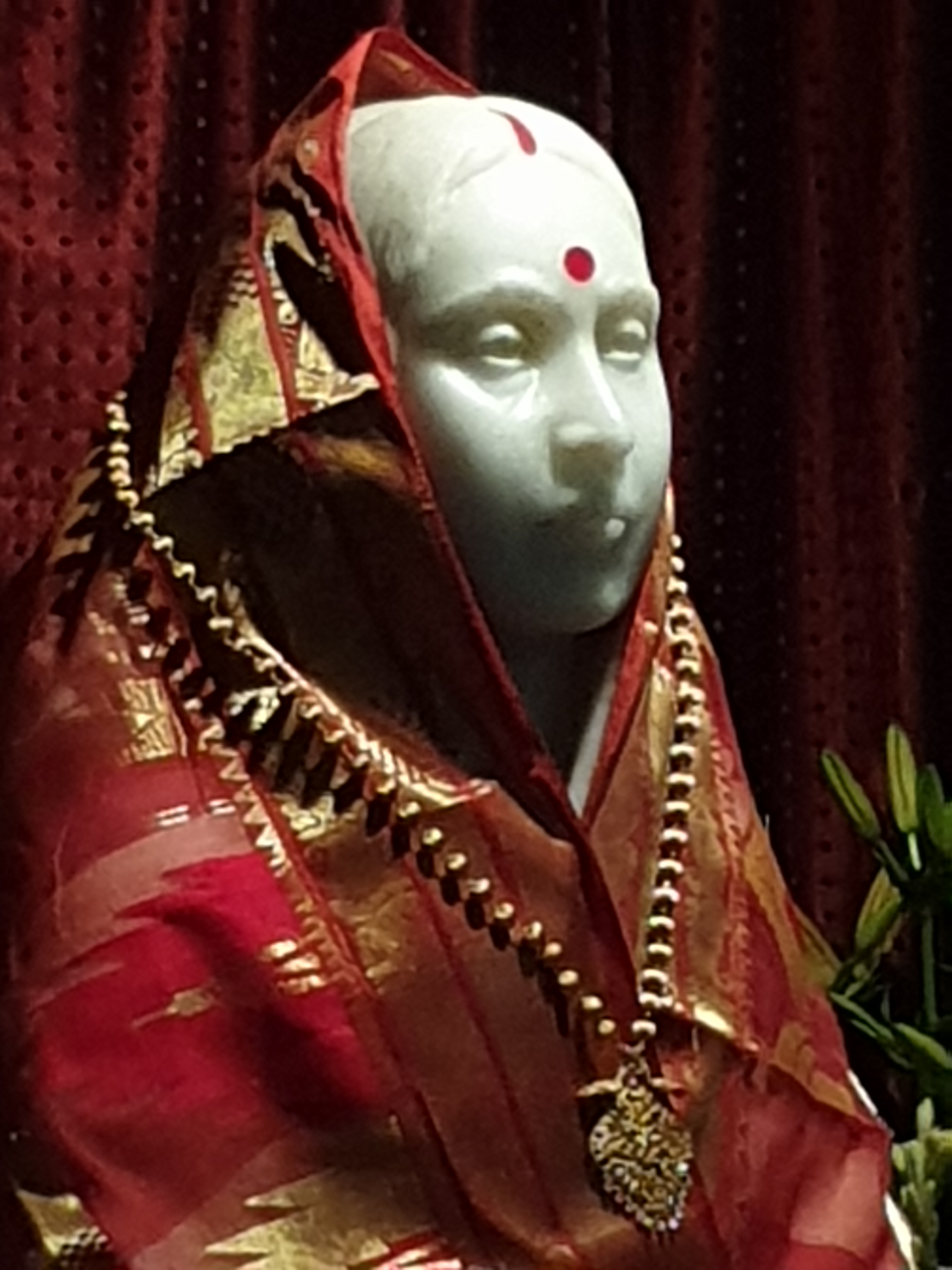
Sri Sri Maa Sarada Devi

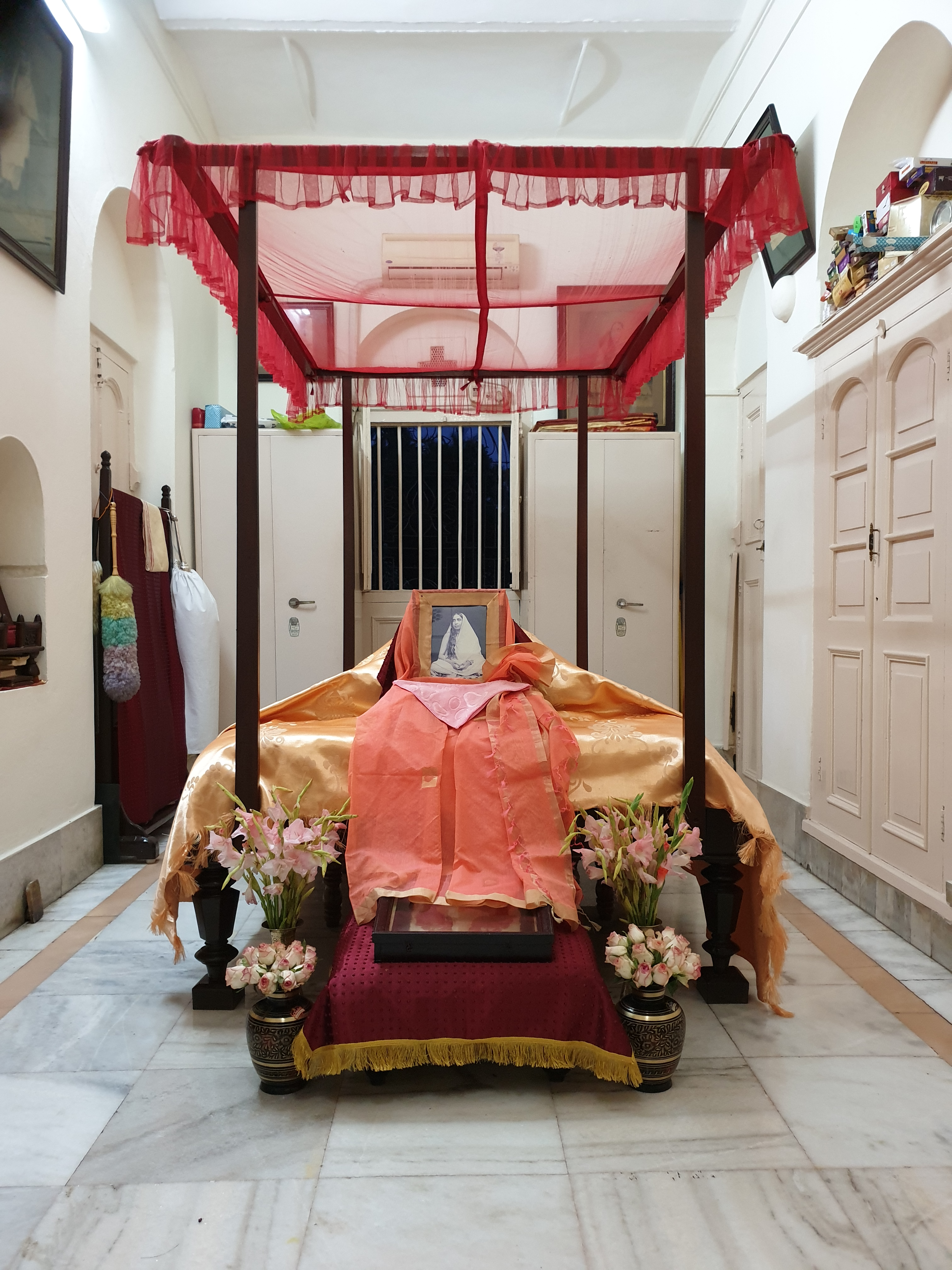
Holy Mothers Shayan Kaksh (Bedroom)

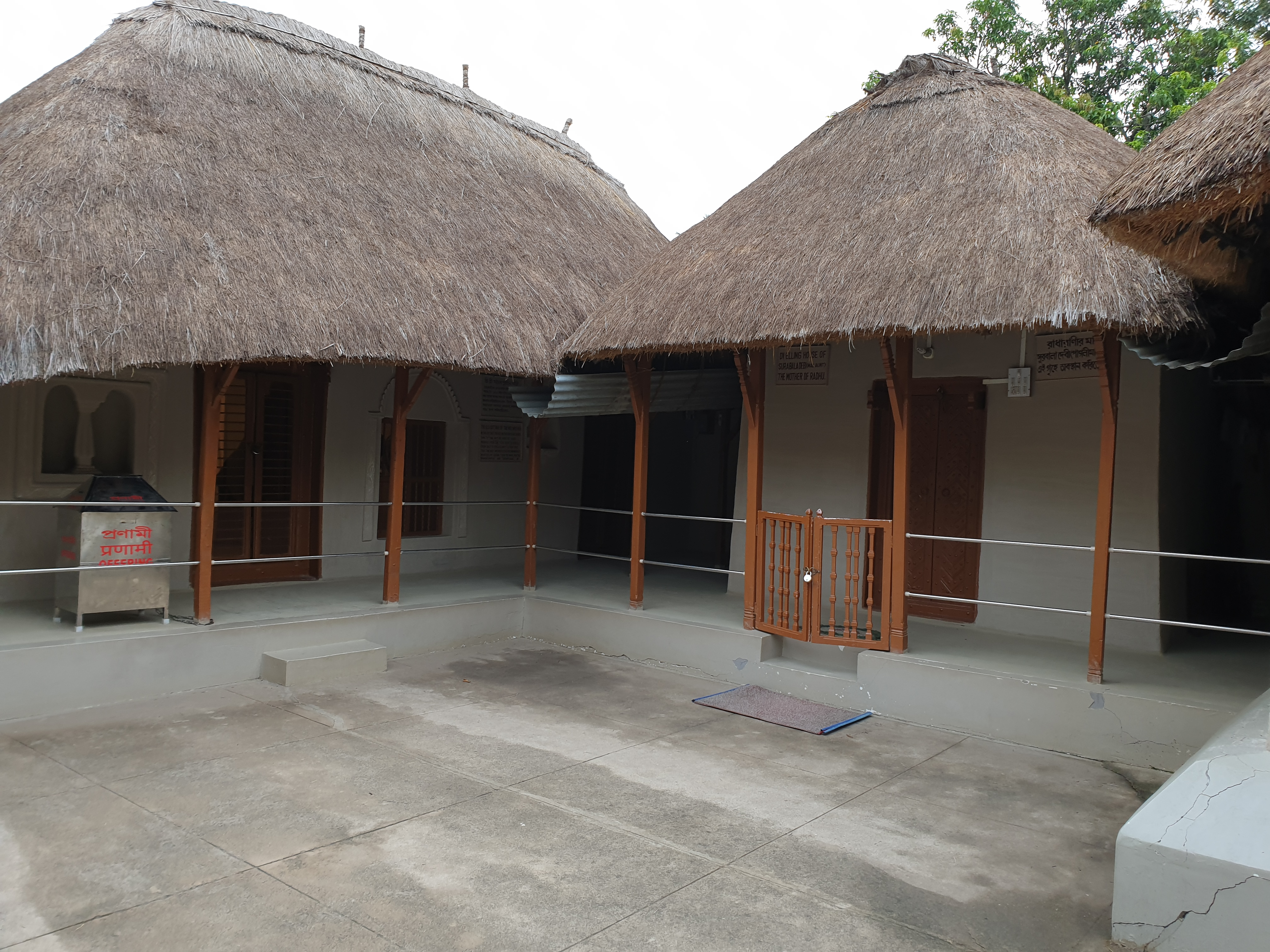
Holy Mothers Old House, Joyrambati

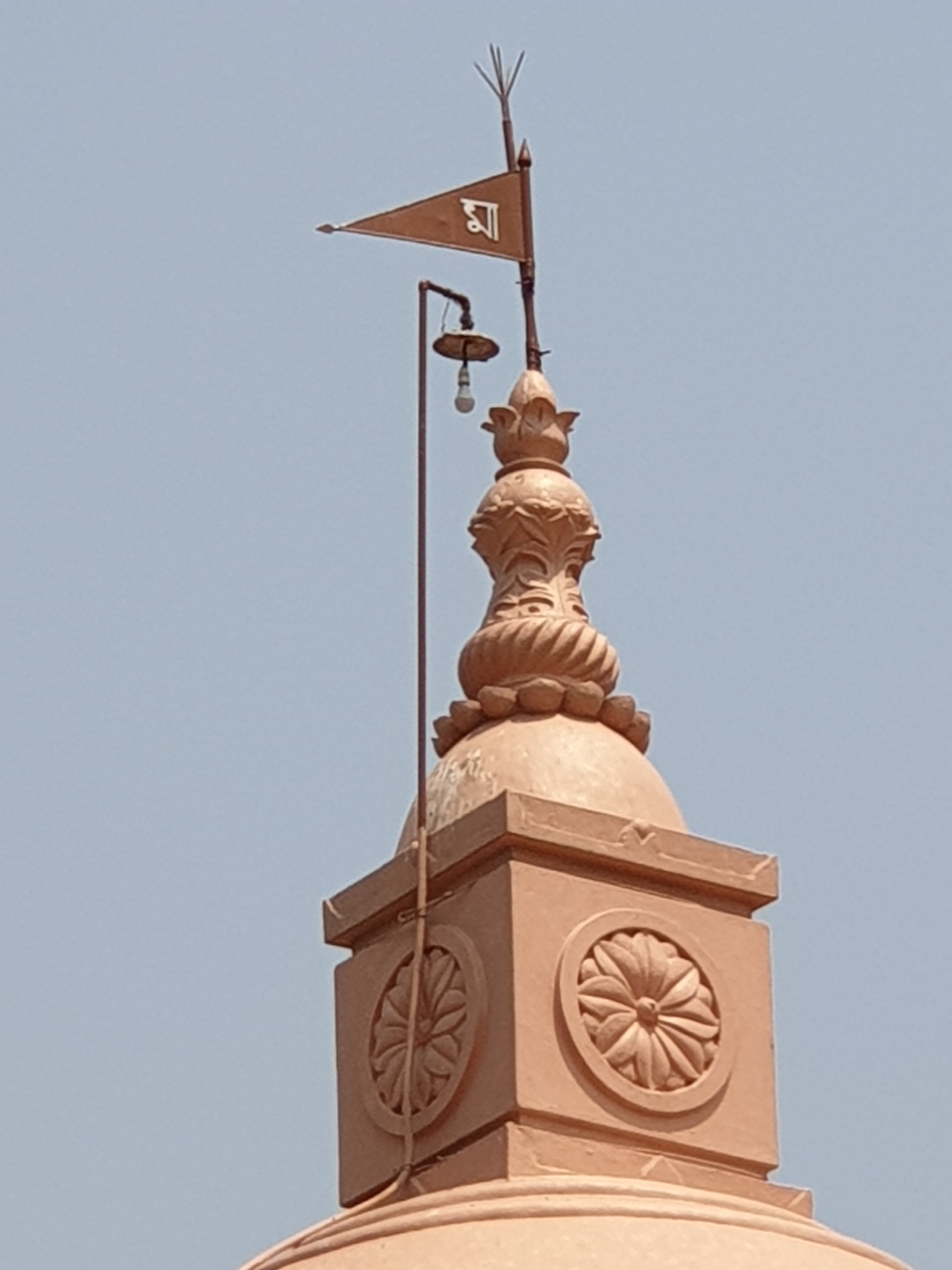
Sri Sri Matri Mandir Joyrambati Temple peak

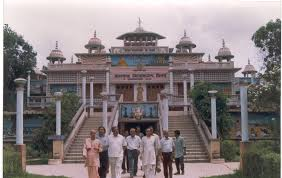
Naranarayan Temple at Joyrambati

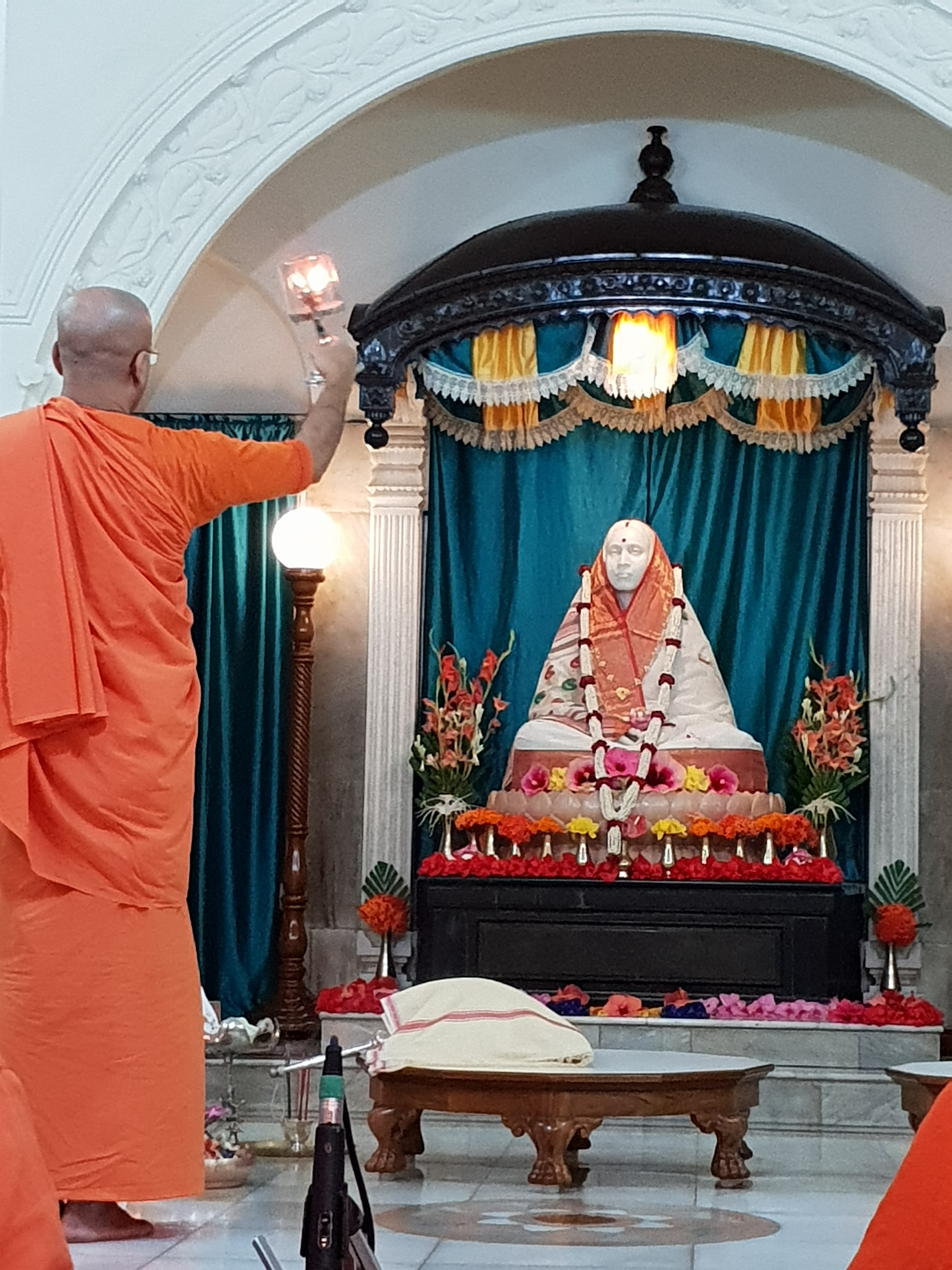
Sandhya Arati in the temple

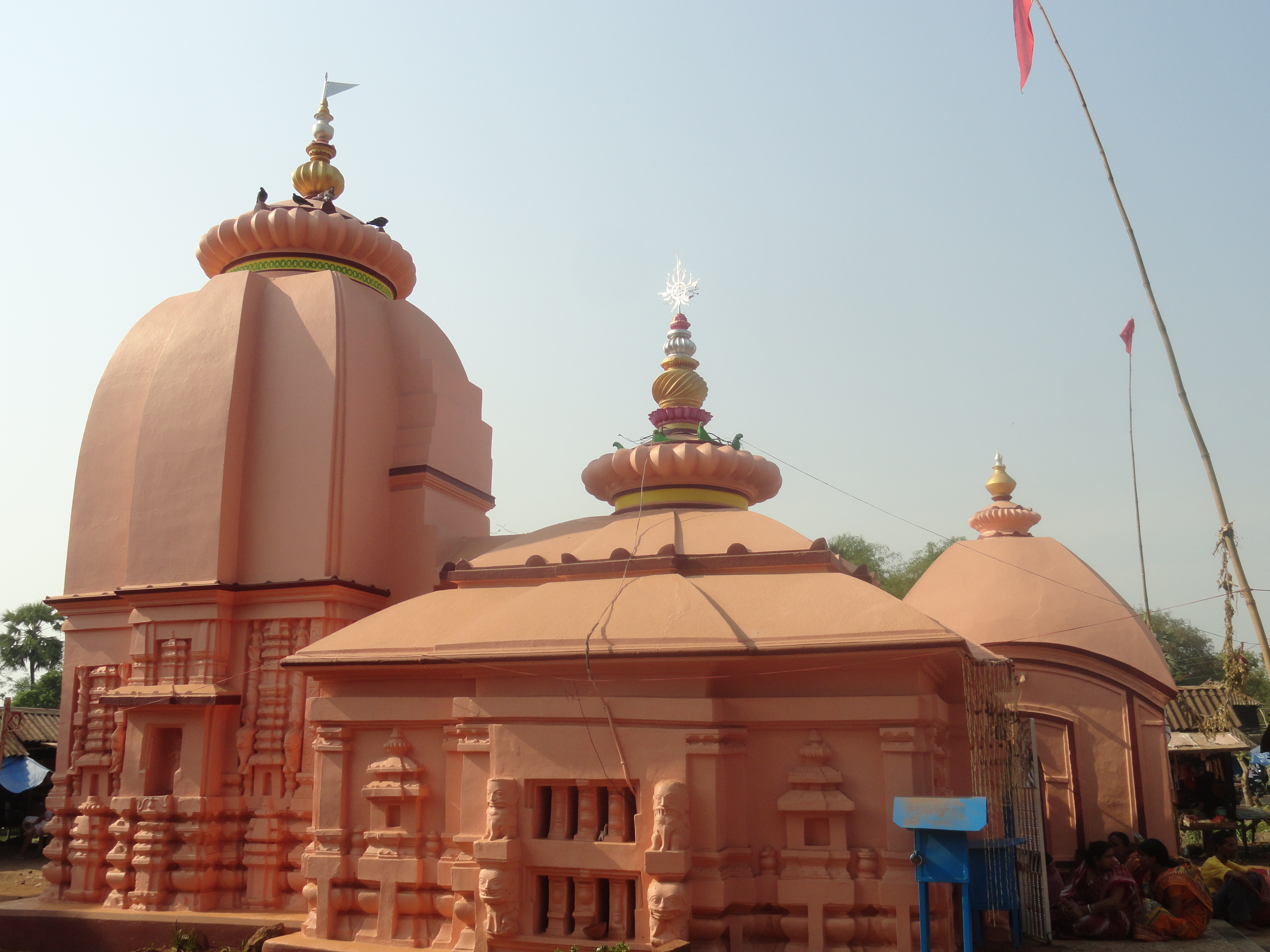
Shantinath Temple at Shihar

== Education ==
Ramakrishna Mission Sarada Vidyapith is a Bengali-medium institution established in 1910. It has facilities for teaching from class V to class X. The school has several computer labs and also special STEM labs for Advanced A.I learning, playgrounds and playing facilities. The school has a total of four sections that include Bengali Medium Primary section for both boys and girls (separate), Bengali Medium High school (boys), Bengali Medium High school (girls), and a co-educational English Medium section. The English Medium section teaches from Class I to Class X, and affiliated to WBBSE Board (English Medium). It was established since 2021.
