= Sarada Devi =

Wife of Hindu mystic (1853–1920)

Sri Sarada Devi
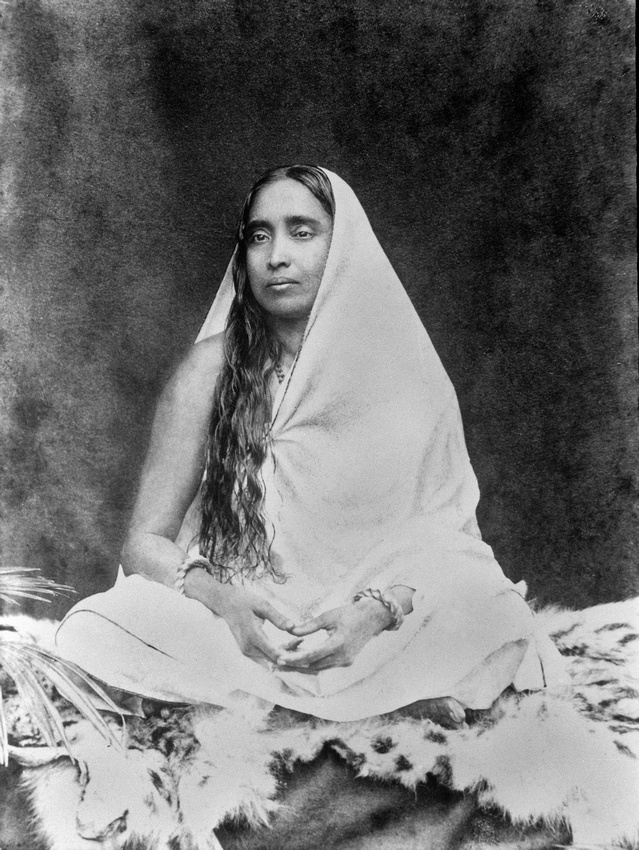
- Sarada Devi, c. 1890

Personal life
- Born: Kshemankari/ Thakurmani/ Saradamani Mukhopadhyay; 22 December 1853 Joyrambati, Bengal Presidency, British India (West Bengal, India)
- Died: 20 July 1920 (aged 66) Bagbazar, Bengal Presidency, British India (West Bengal, India)
- Cause of death: Black fever
- Spouse: Ramakrishna Paramhamsa (m. 1859)
- Honors: Shree Shree Maa

Religious life
- Religion: Hinduism

Religious career
- Teacher: Ramakrishna Paramahamsa (spiritual consort) (m. 1959)

Quotation

"I am the mother of the wicked, as I am the mother of the virtuous. Never fear. Whenever you are in distress, just say to yourself 'I have a mother.'"

Sri Sarada Devi (Bengali: সারদা দেবী; Sharodā Debi; 22 December 1853 – 20 July 1920), born Kshemankari / Thakurmani / Saradamani Mukhopadhyay, was the wife and spiritual consort of Ramakrishna Paramahamsa, a nineteenth-century Hindu mystic. Sarada Devi is also reverentially addressed as the Holy Mother (Sri Sri Maa) by the followers of the Sri Ramakrishna monastic order. The Sri Sarada Math and Ramakrishna Sarada Mission situated at Dakshineshwar is based on the ideals and life of Sarada Devi. She was involved in an important role in the growth of the Ramakrishna Movement.

Sarada Devi was born at Joyrambati, a village that became part of Bankura District in the state of West Bengal, India. She was married to Ramakrishna in 1859 when she was only 5 years old and Ramakrishna was 23 years old, but remained with her family until she was 18 years old, when she joined Ramakrishna at Dakshineswar Kali temple. According to her biographers, both lived "lives of unbroken continence, showing the ideals of a householder and of the monastic ways of life". After Ramakrishna's death, Sarada Devi stayed most of the time either at Joyrambati or at the Udbodhan office, Calcutta. The disciples of Ramakrishna addressed her as their own mother, and after their guru's death looked to her for advice and encouragement. The followers of the Ramakrishna movement and a large section of devotees across the world worship Sarada Devi as an incarnation of the Adi Parashakti or the Divine Mother.

== Biography ==
=== Birth and parentage ===
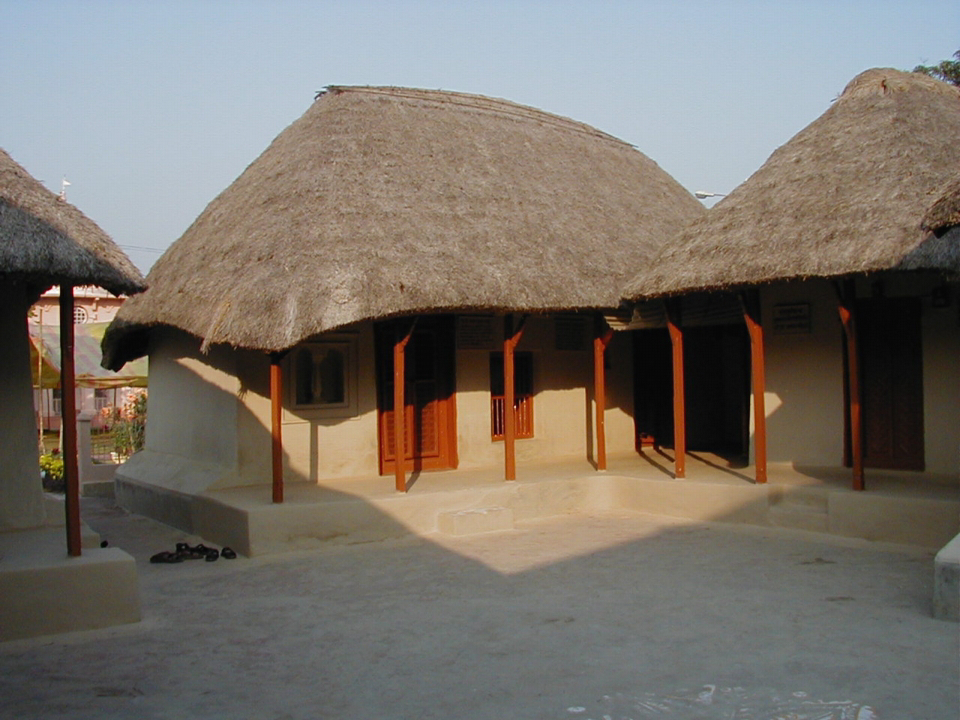
Sarada Devi's house at Joyrambati (centre) where she lived for the majority of her life

Saradamani Devi was born of Brahmin parents as the eldest daughter on 22 December 1853, in the quiet village of Joyrambati in present-day West Bengal, India. Her parents, Ramachandra Mukhopadhyay and ShyamaSundari Devi, were very poor. Her father, Ramchandra earned his living as a farmer and through the performance of a priest also. According to traditional accounts, Ramachandra and ShyamaSundari had visions and supernatural events foretelling the birth of a divine being as their daughter.

Sarada's life was simple of an Indian village girl. As a child, Sarada—then known as Saradamani—was fascinated by traditional Hindu folklore and narratives. Like most girls of rural upbringing, she did not receive any formal education but learned to serve others as she helped her mother run a large household and looked after her younger brothers. During the terrible famine of 1864, Sarada worked ceaselessly as her family served food to hungry people. She was interested in the clay models of Hindu goddesses Kali and Lakshmi, which she worshiped regularly. She is said to have started meditating from her childhood, and traditional accounts recount her mystic visions and experiences. According to Sarada Devi, she used to see a bevy of eight girls of her age coming from an unknown place and escorting her in her chores during her childhood.

The mother and brother of Ramakrishna thought that a marriage would be a good steadying effect on him, by diverting his attention away from spiritual austerities and visions. It is reported that Ramakrishna himself indicated Saradamani as the bride. In May 1859, Sarada was betrothed to Ramakrishna. Sarada was 5 years old and Ramakrishna was 23; the 18 years age difference was typical for 19th century rural Bengal.

After the betrothal, Sarada was kept to the care of her parents and Ramakrishna returned to Dakshineswar. Sarada next met Ramakrishna when she was fourteen years old, and she spent three months with him at Kamarpukur. There, Ramakrishna imparted to Sarada instructions on meditation and spiritual life. Ramakrishna's frequent bhava samadhi (ecstasy) and unorthodox ways of worship led some onlookers to doubt his mental stability, while others regarded him as a great saint. Sarada joined Ramakrishna at Dakshineswar in 1872 on her own accord when she was eighteen, after hearing these rumours about his mental health. She found Ramakrishna to be a kind and caring person.

=== At Dakshineswar Kali Temple ===
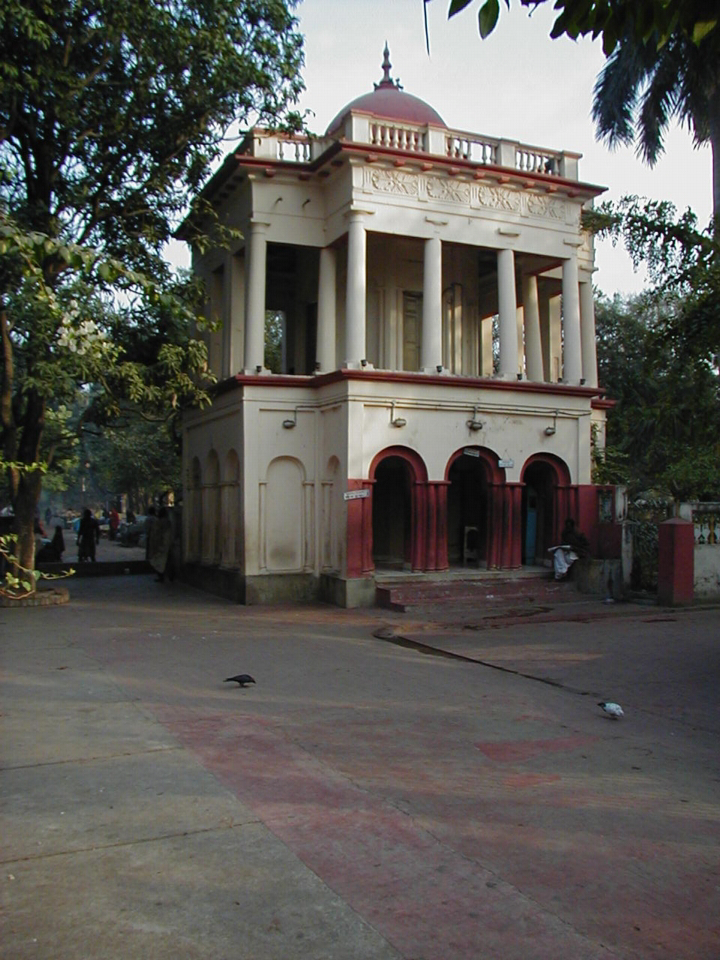
The south side of the nahabat (music tower), where Sarada Devi lived in a small room on the ground floor.

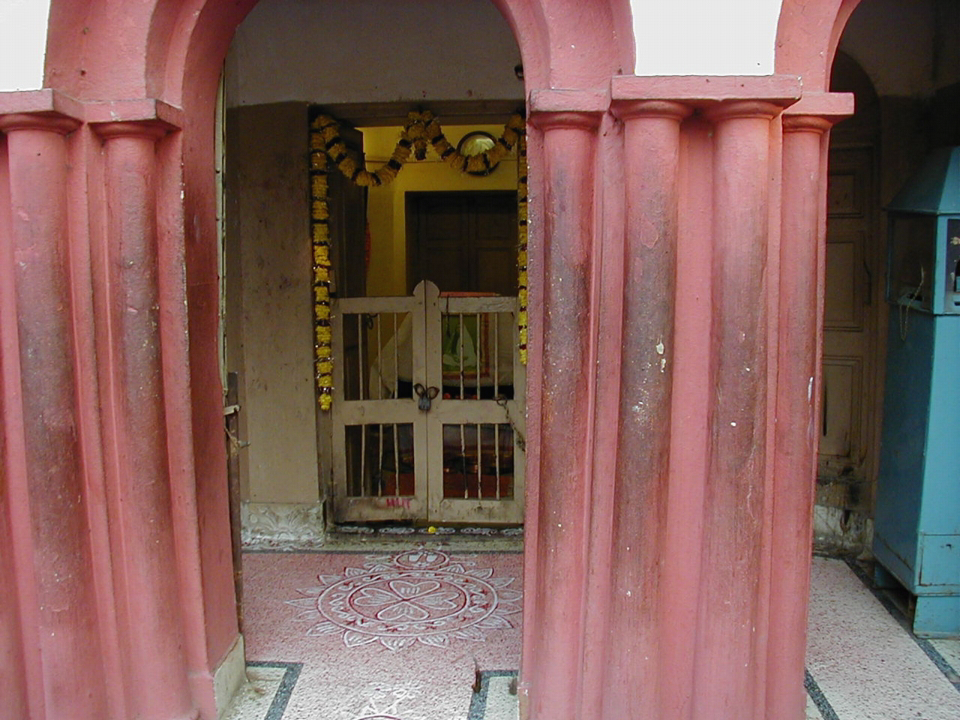
Sarada Devi's tiny room on the ground floor of the nahabat, now a shrine

At Dakshineswar, Sarada Devi stayed in a tiny room in the nahabat (music tower). She stayed at Dakshineswar until 1885, except for short periods when she visited Jayrambati. By this time Ramakrishna had already embraced the monastic life of a sannyasin; as a result, the marriage was never consummated. As a priest, Ramakrishna performed the ritual ceremony—the Shodashi Puja where Sarada Devi was made to sit in the seat of goddess Kali, and worshiped as the divine mother Tripurasundari. According to Swami Saradananda a direct disciple of Ramakrishna, Ramakrishna married to show the world an ideal of a sexless marriage. Ramakrishna regarded Sarada as an incarnation of the Divine Mother, addressing her as Sree Maa (Holy Mother) and it was by this name that she was known to Ramakrishna's disciples.

Sarada Devi's days began at 3 am. After finishing her ablutions in the Bhāgirathi-Hooghly, she would practice japa and meditation until daybreak. Ramakrishna taught her the sacred mantras, and instructed her how to initiate people and guide them in spiritual life. Sarada Devi is regarded as Ramakrishna's first disciple. Except for her hours of meditation, most of her time was spent in cooking for Ramakrishna and the growing number of his devotees. While Sarada Devi remained completely in the background, her unassuming, warm personality attracted some female devotees to become her lifelong companions.

During Ramakrishna's last days, during which he suffered from throat cancer, Sarada Devi played an important role in nursing him and preparing suitable food for him and his disciples. It is reported that after Ramakrishna's death in August 1886, when Sarada Devi tried to remove her bracelets as the customs dictated for a widow, she had a vision of Ramakrishna in which he said, "I have not passed away, I have gone from one room to another." According to her, whenever she thought of dressing like a widow, she had a vision of Ramakrishna asking her not to do so. After Ramakrishna's death, Sarada Devi continued to play an important role in the nascent religious movement. She remained the spiritual guide of the movement for the next 34 years.

=== Pilgrimage ===
After Ramakrishna's death, Sarada Devi began her pilgrimage through North India, accompanied by a party of women disciples including Lakshmi Didi, Golap Ma, and Ramakrishna's householder and monastic disciples. The party visited the Vishwanath Temple of god Shiva at Banaras and the city of Ayodhya, which is associated with the life of the god Rama. Later, she visited Vrindavan which is associated with the god Krishna. According to traditional accounts, at Vrindavan, she experienced nirvikalpa samadhi and began her role as guru. She initiated several of Ramakrishna's disciples including Mahendranath Gupta, Yogen with a mantra. According to her traditional biographers and disciples, to call her "Mother" was no mere expression of respect and all those who met her became aware of a maternal quality in her.

=== In Calcutta ===
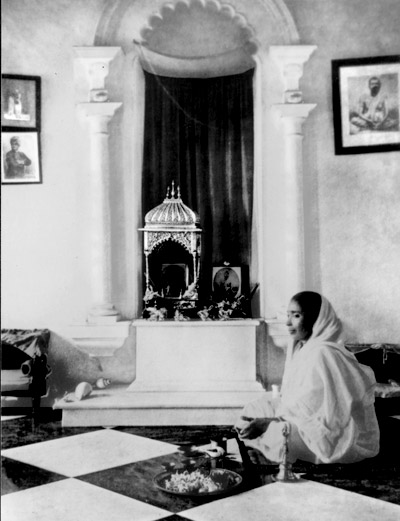
Sarada Devi worshiping at her Udbodhan residence in Calcutta.

After the pilgrimage, Sarada Devi lived alone in Kamarpukur, the village where Ramakrishna was born. There, she endured poverty, verging on starvation for a year. In 1888, when the news reached the lay and monastic disciples of Ramakrishna that she needed their care and attention, they invited her to Calcutta and arranged for her stay. Swami Saradananda built a permanent house for Sarada Devi in Calcutta. The house was named the Udbodhan House, after the Bengali monthly magazine published by the Ramakrishna Math. The house, also known as Mayerbari ("Holy Mother's House"), is where she spent the longest period of her life outside Jayrambati.

Sarada Devi went to Calcutta because she had many hardships in Kamarpukur. She had no financial resources and no one could take care of her. She tried to hide her situation, but it leaked out. When the devotees at Calcutta heard this, they persuaded Sarada Devi to come to Calcutta.

At Udbodhan House, Sarada Devi was accompanied by other women disciples and devotees of Ramakrishna, Golap Ma, Yogin Ma, Gopaler Ma, Lakshmi Didi and Gauri Ma being the best known. An increasing number of people began to flock for guidance, instructions and spiritual initiation. Other Western women followers of Ramakrishna Order including Sister Nivedita formed close relationship with her. According to her biographers, her innate motherliness put visitors at ease. Swami Nikhilananda, her direct disciple writes, "Though she had no children of the flesh, she had many of the spirit." She regarded all her disciples as her own children.

Sarada Devi received the highest reverence from the Ramakrishna Order and its devotees. Ramakrishna had bade her continue his mission after his death and wanted his disciples not to make any distinction between himself and her. According to her devotees and traditional biographers, the hospitality of Sarada Devi was unique and was characterised by motherly care and solicitude. Traditional accounts recount the mystical experiences of her devotees. Some dreamt of her as a goddess in human form, though they had never seen her picture before. Others reportedly received their initiation from her in their dream. One such example is of Girish Chandra Ghosh, the father of Bengali drama, who reportedly saw Sarada Devi in a dream when he was nineteen years old and received a mantra. When he met her many years later, to his astonishment, she was the same person as in the dream.

=== Last days ===
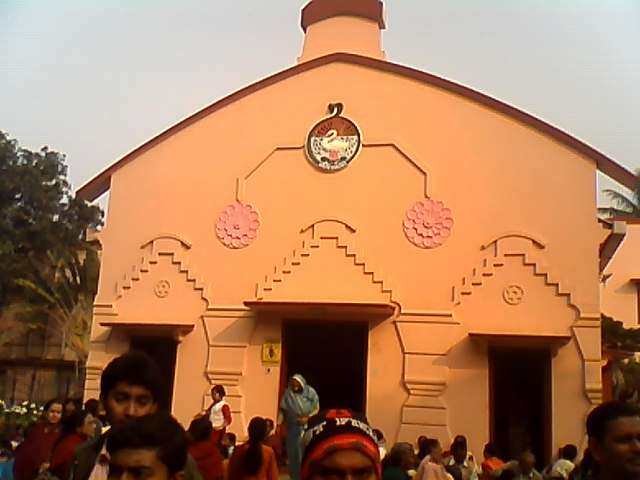
The shrine of Sarada Devi at Belur Math.

Sarada Devi spent her final years moving back and forth between Jayrambati and Calcutta. In January 1919, Sarada Devi went to Jayrambati and stayed there for over a year. For the next five months, she continued to suffer. Shortly before her death, she gave the last advice to the grief-stricken devotees, "But I tell you one thing—if you want peace of mind, do not find fault with others. Rather, see your own faults. Learn to make the whole world your own. No one is a stranger, my child: this whole world is your own!" This is considered as her last message to the world.

She died at 1.30 am on Tuesday, the 20th of July, 1920 at Mayer Badi (the first floor of the Shrine Room), Kolkata. Her body was cremated at Belur Math, on the opposite bank of River Ganga where Ramakrishna's body was cremated at Kashipore, Baranagore, Babu ghat. The place where she was cremated is now known as Holy Mother's ghat at Belur Math. Today a temple stands at that spot.

== Teachings and quotes ==
Sarada Devi did not write any books; her utterances and reminiscences have been recorded by her disciples including Swami Nikhilananda, Swami Tapasyananda. Though uneducated Sarada Devi's spiritual insight and utterances are highly regarded by scholars like Gayatri Chakravorty Spivak, who writes, "We have bits and pieces of her exquisite remarks as testimony."

- Practise meditation, and by and by your mind will be so calm and fixed that you will find it hard to keep away from meditation.
- The mind is everything. It is in the mind alone that one feels pure and impure. A man, first of all, must make his own mind guilty and then alone can he see another man's guilt.
- "I tell you one thing. If you want peace of mind, do not find fault with others. Rather see your own faults. Learn to make the whole world your own. No one is a stranger, my child; the whole world is your own."
- One must have devotion towards one's own guru. Whatever may be the nature of the guru, the disciple gets salvation by dint of his unflinching devotion towards his guru.

== Impact and legacy ==
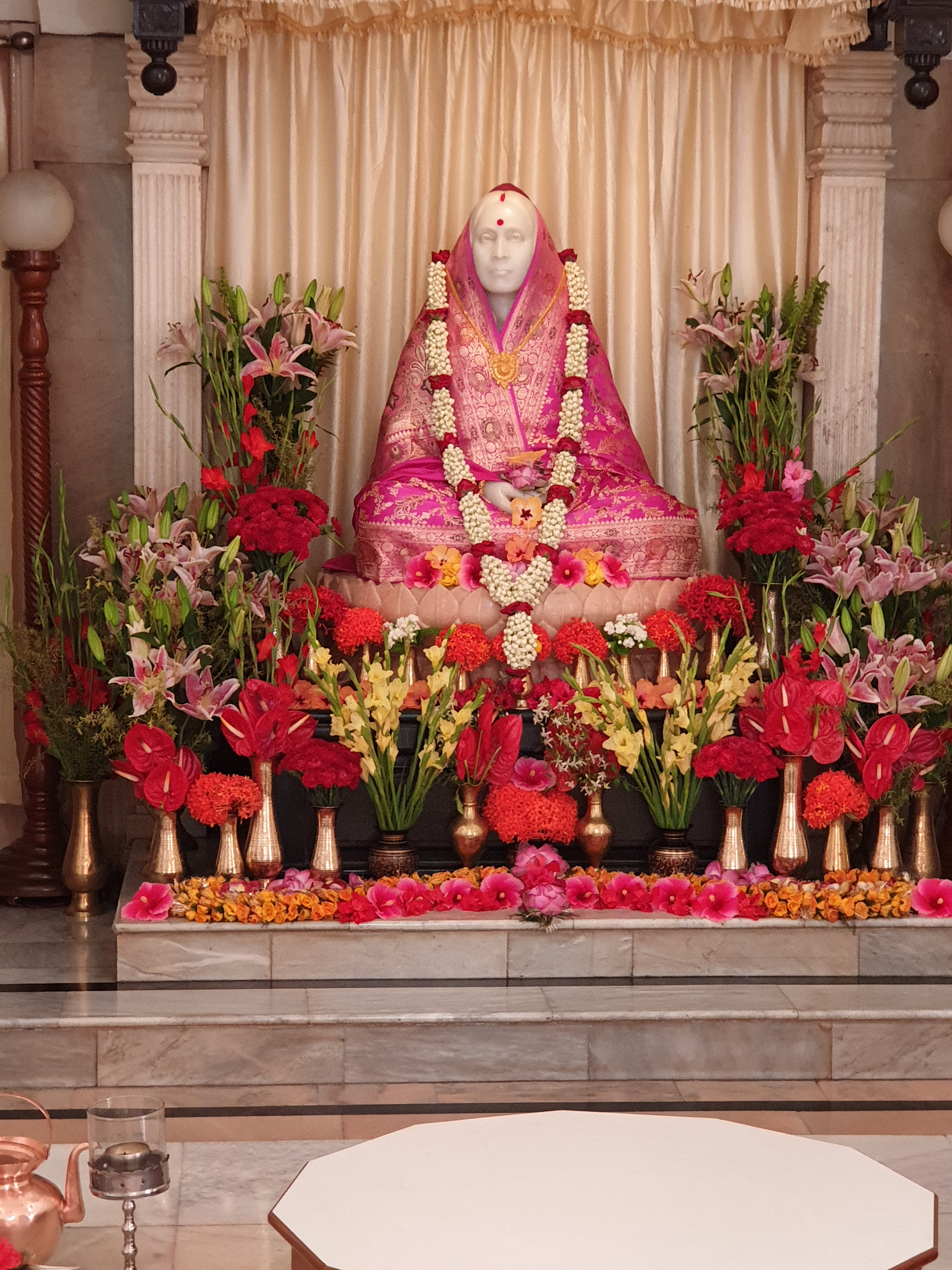
Sarada Devi worshipped in the Sri Sri Matri Mandir Temple Joyrambati

Sarada Devi played an important role as the advisory head of a nascent organisation that became a monastic order devoted to social work—the Ramakrishna Mission. Gayatri Spivak writes that Sarada Devi "performed her role with tact and wisdom, always remaining in the background." She initiated several prominent monks into the Ramakrishna Order. Swami Nikhilananda, who was a freedom fighter and a follower of Mahatma Gandhi, accepted Sarada Devi as his guru and joined the Ramakrishna Order. He eventually founded the Ramakrishna-Vivekananda Center in New York.

Although uneducated herself, Sarada Devi advocated education for women. Nivedita started a school for Indian women with her blessings. She entrusted Devamata with the implementation of her dream—a girls' school on the Ganges, where Eastern and Western pupils could study together. In 1954, Sri Sarada Math and Ramakrishna Sarada Mission, a monastic order for women was founded in the honour of Sarada Devi.

Swami Vivekananda wrote a letter to her to get her opinion about his intention to attend the Parliament of Religions in Chicago. Only after receiving the blessing from her did he decide to go to the United States.

== See also ==
- Swami Vivekananda
- Bijoy Krishna Goswami
- Paramahansa Yogananda
- Anandamayi Ma
