= List of schools in Kolkata =

The following is a list of notable schools in Kolkata, in the capital city of West Bengal, in India.

== A ==
- Armenian College
- Army Public School, Ballygunge

== B ==
- Ballygunge Government High School, Ballygunge
- Baranagore Ramakrishna Mission Ashrama High School, Baranagar
- Barasat Mahatma Gandhi Memorial High School, Barasat
- Barrackpore Government High School, Barrackpore
- Barisha High School, Behala
- Barisha Girls' High School, Paschim Barisha
- Baruipur High School, Baruipur
- B.D.Memorial International
- Behala High School, Behala
- Belgharia High School, Belgharia
- Beltala Girls' High School, Hazra
- Bhavan's Gangabux Kanoria Vidyamandir, Bidhannagar
- The Bhawanipur Gujarati Education Society School, Bhowanipore
- Bidhannagar Municipal School, Bidhannagar
- Bidya Bharati Girls' High School, New Alipore
- Binodini Girls' High School, Dhakuria
- B. T. Road Government Sponsored H. S. School, Cossipore

== C ==
- The Calcutta Anglo Gujarati School, Burrabazar
- Calcutta Boys' School
- Calcutta Girls' High School
- Central Modern School, Baranagar

== D ==
- Don Bosco School, Park Circus

== F ==
- The Future Foundation School

== G ==
- G. D. Birla Centre for Education, Ranikuthi
- Grace Ling Liang English School, Tangra

== H ==
- Hare School
- Hindu School
- Hindu Vidyapith, Rajarhat
- Holy Child Institute, Beadon Street

== J ==
- Jadavpur Vidyapith, Jadavpur
- Jagatpur Rukmini Vidyamandir, Behala

== K ==
- Kamala Girls' High School, Vivekananda Park
- Kalikrishna Girls' High School, Barasat
- Kanchrapara Harnett High School, Kanchrapara

== L ==
- La Martinière Calcutta
- Laban Hrad Vidyapith, Bidhannagar
- Lakshmipat Singhania Academy
- Loreto House

== M ==
- M. P. Birla Foundation Higher Secondary School, Behala
- Mahadevi Birla World Academy
- Mitra Institution (Main)

== N ==
- Narkeldanga High School, Narkeldanga
- National English School, Baguiati
- National High School - Hazra and Sarat Bose
- Nava Nalanda High School
- The Newtown School, Rajarhat

== O ==
- Oaktree International School, Naurbad
- Oriental Seminary
- Our Lady Queen of the Missions School, Bidhannagar

== P ==
- Patha Bhavan, Ballygunge

== R ==
- Ramakrishna Sarada Mission Sister Nivedita Girls' School, Bagbazar

== S ==
- Sailendra Sircar Vidyalaya, Shyampukur
- Sakhawat Memorial Govt. Girls' High School, Elgin
- Salt Lake School, Bidhannagar
- Salt Lake Shiksha Niketan, Bidhannagar
- Sanskrit Collegiate School, College Street
- Scottish Church Collegiate School - Beadon Street, Bidhan Sarani and Kestopur
- Shree Jain Vidyalaya, Burrabazar
- Shri Shikshayatan School, Elgin
- Sodepur High School, Sodepur
- South Point School
- Sri Aurobindo, Bidhannagar
- St. Francis Xavier School
- St. James' School
- St. John's Diocesan Girls' Higher Secondary School
- St. Joseph's College
- St. Lawrence High School
- St. Mary's Orphanage & Day School, Dum Dum
- St. Thomas' School, Kidderpore
- St. Xavier's Collegiate School

== V ==
- Vidhyanjali High School, Bhawanipore

== W ==
- Welland Gouldsmith School - Bowbazar and Patuli

== Former schools ==
- Calcutta Japanese School (カルカタ日本人学校) (Nihonjin Gakko Japanese Day School)
- Calcutta Hoshu Jugyo Ko (Supplementary Weekend Japanese School)
- Hindu Mahila Vidyalaya
