= Suburban Reading Club =

Library in Kolkata, India

Coordinates: 22°34′16″N 88°23′06″E

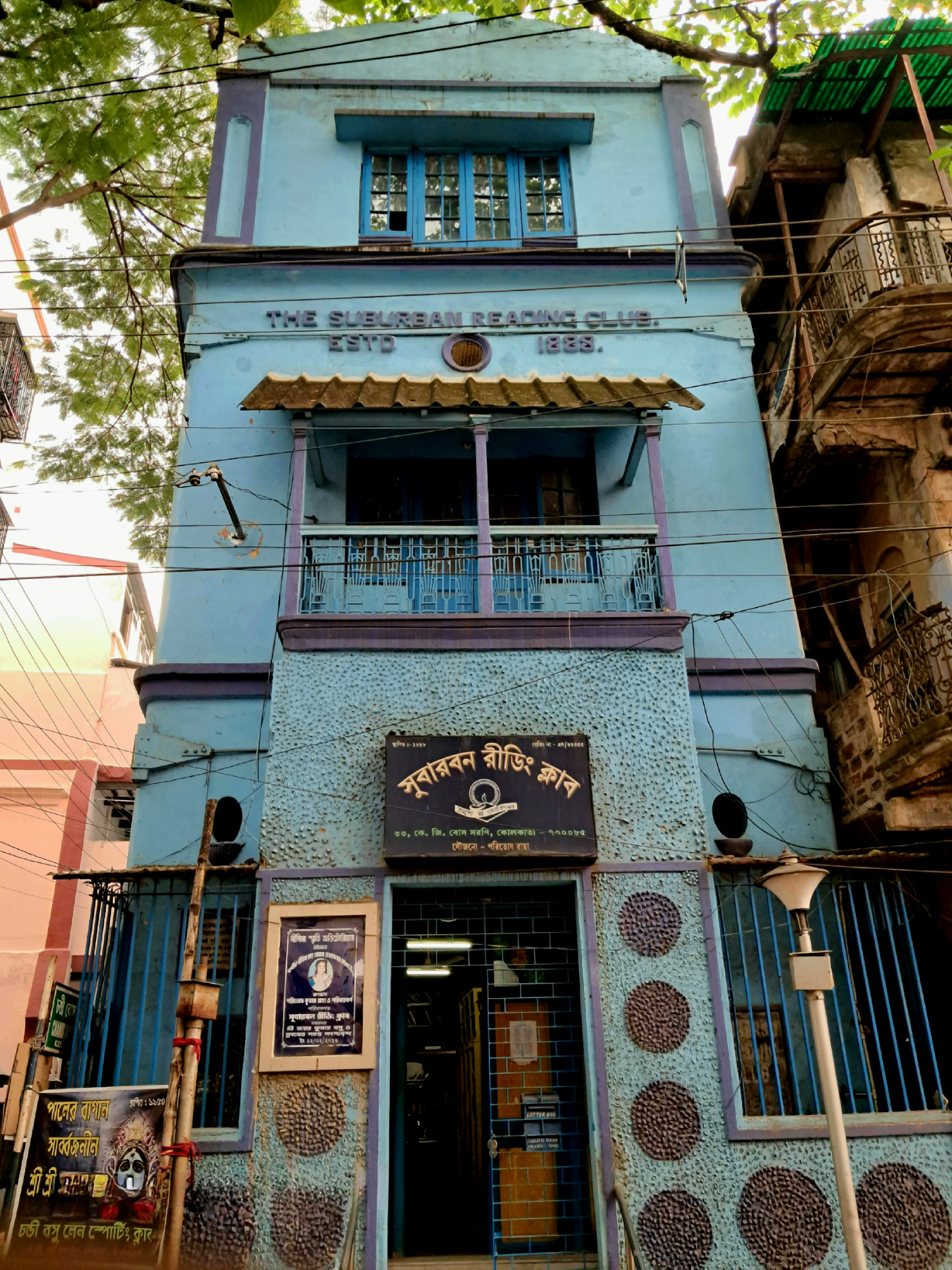

Suburban Reading Club is one of the oldest libraries in Kolkata, West Bengal, India. In the year 1888, The Suburban Reading Club was founded in a small room of the Narkaldanga High School in Beliaghata Narkeldanga Area. The legendary personalities of this area Sir Gurudas Banerjee, Raja Rajendralal Mitra, Rakhal Chandra Ghosh and Harish Chandra Chakraborty, a dedicated teacher of the school decided to open a library for this eastern part of the then suburban Calcutta.

== History ==
In 1862, the establishment of the "Narikeldanga High School" took place in the Narkeldanga region. One of the main proponents behind the school's inception was Sir Gurudas Bandyopadhyay. Following this, in 1888, a proposal for a library was put forth during a meeting held at the school, which eventually led to the formation of the "Suburban Reading Club." Initially, the library was managed by the teacher Harishchandra Chakraborty, who later relocated it to his own residence due to space constraints within the school. Subsequently, in 1900, he purchased land to construct a dedicated building for the library.

Unfortunately, in 1908, due to a lack of proper maintenance, the library had to be temporarily closed. However, in 1917, with the support of local youths, the library found a new home at Nalinikanta Basu's residence on 53 Talpukur Road. During this period, there was no standalone building designated for the library. Eventually, through contributions from various individuals and organizations, including the East Suburban Municipality and Shaw Wallace Company, the library was relocated to its own premises on 33 Talpukur Road from its initial location on 53 Talpukur Road. Presently, the library boasts 550 members and a collection of approximately 35,000 books.

In 1924, construction began on a two-story building for the library. Interestingly, at that time, there were no educational institutions specifically catering to girls in the area. It wasn't until 1925 that the members of the "Suburban Reading Club" came together to establish the "Surahkanya Vidyalay" for the education of local girls. In instances where the student population increased, the library would be expanded to three floors to accommodate the additional students.

The inaugural year of the school saw thirty students, including the notable presence of Renu, daughter of Brajendranath Basu. Renu would later gain recognition as Pravrajika Mokshaprana Mataji, assuming the role of the second president of the Dakshineswar Sri Sarada Math and Mission. After three years since its inception, the school welcomed Asha as a student. Asha, later known as Muktiprana Mataji, served as the first regular editor of the Sri Sarada Math. As student enrollment continued to rise, the adjacent property at 27 Hare Mohan Ghosh Lane was acquired, leading to the relocation of the "Surukanya Bidyalay" to this new site.
