= Pravrajika Bhaktiprana =

Indian Hindu nun (1920–2022)

- Born: October 1920; Calcutta, Bengal Presidency, British India
- Died: 11 December 2022 (aged 102); Kolkata, West Bengal, India
- Occupation: Hindu Missionary
- Years active: 1950–2022
- Known for: expanding a 10-bedded maternity centre into a 100-bedded modern hospital

Pravrajika Bhaktiprana (October 1920 – 11 December 2022) was an Indian Hindu sannyasini and the fourth president of the Sri Sarada Math and Ramakrishna Sarada Mission, Dakshineswar, in Kolkata, India. She took over as president of the institution on 2 April 2009. In her name "Pravrajika" means "mendicant nun" and the suffix to her name Bhakti is 'prana' which means "who is devoted to".

== Early life ==
Bhaktiprana was born in Calcutta (now Kolkata) in October 1920. She did her school education from the Gouri Ma's Saradeswari Ashram in Calcutta. Right from a very young age her interest was towards spirituality, and she was associated with the monks of the Belur Math of the Ramakrishna Math and Ramakrishna Mission. She initially trained as a nurse. In 1950, she was employed as a nurse at the Matri Bhavan, a hospital that was under the Ramakrishna Sarada Mission in Tollygunge.

== Work ==
Bhaktiprana was given oath of Mantra Diksha by Swami Vijnanananda, who was a disciple of Sri Ramakrishna, and was then also the fourth president of Ramakrishna Math and Mission and was given the oath of Brahmacharya in 1953 by Swami Shankarananda. She was made a sanyasini in 1959 by Swami Shankarananda, the president of Ramakrishna Math at that time. She was given the trusteeship of the Sri Sarada Math in 1959. In 1959 itself the math had been given an independent identity. In 1960, she became a member of the governing body of the Ramakrishna Sarada Mission. When Matri Bhavan hospital, a 10-bed maternity care centre where she had worked as a nurse came under the control of Ramakrishna Sarada Mission following its transfer from the Ramakrishna Mission she was appointed its secretary. Under her leadership the hospital has now expanded into a 100-bedded modern hospital facility from an earlier 10-bed maternity care centre. In December 1998, she got elected to the post of vice president of the Sri Sarada Math and Ramakrishna Sarada Mission. On 13 October 2003 as vice president she was a special invitee for the inauguration of the Vedanta Centre at Pangot. Following the death of Pravrajika Shraddhaprana in February 2009, she took over as president of the mission in April 2009. On assuming this position she said "All my life, I have tried to live for others. That’s what Ma [Sarada Devi] would’ve wanted me to do... Without Ma’s blessings, we are nothing."

== Death ==
It was reported that Bhaktiprana was hospitalized after experiencing a high fever and lung infection. She was subsequently admitted to the ICU at Ramakrishna Mission Seva Pratishthan. Bhaktiprana died on 11 December 2022, at a hospital, late Sunday night at the age of 102.
