= Behala High School =

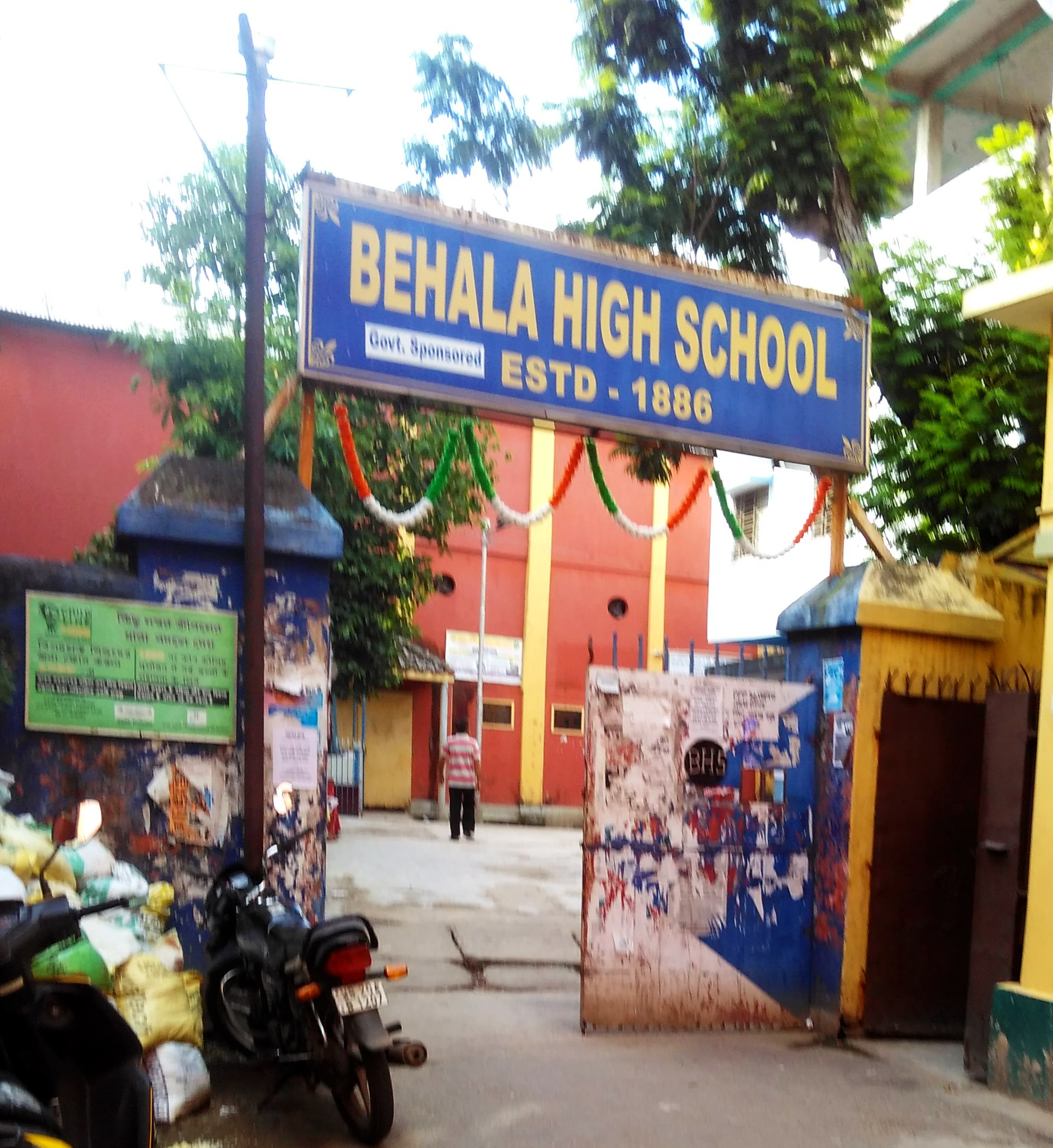
- Behala High School main gate

Location
- Kolkata, West Bengal; India
- Coordinates: 22°30′18.07″N 88°18′56.54″E

Information
- School type: Government of West Bengal Bengali/English medium
- Founded: 1886
- Grades: Lower Nursery to Class XII examination
- Campus type: Urban
- Affiliation: WBBSE, WBCHSE

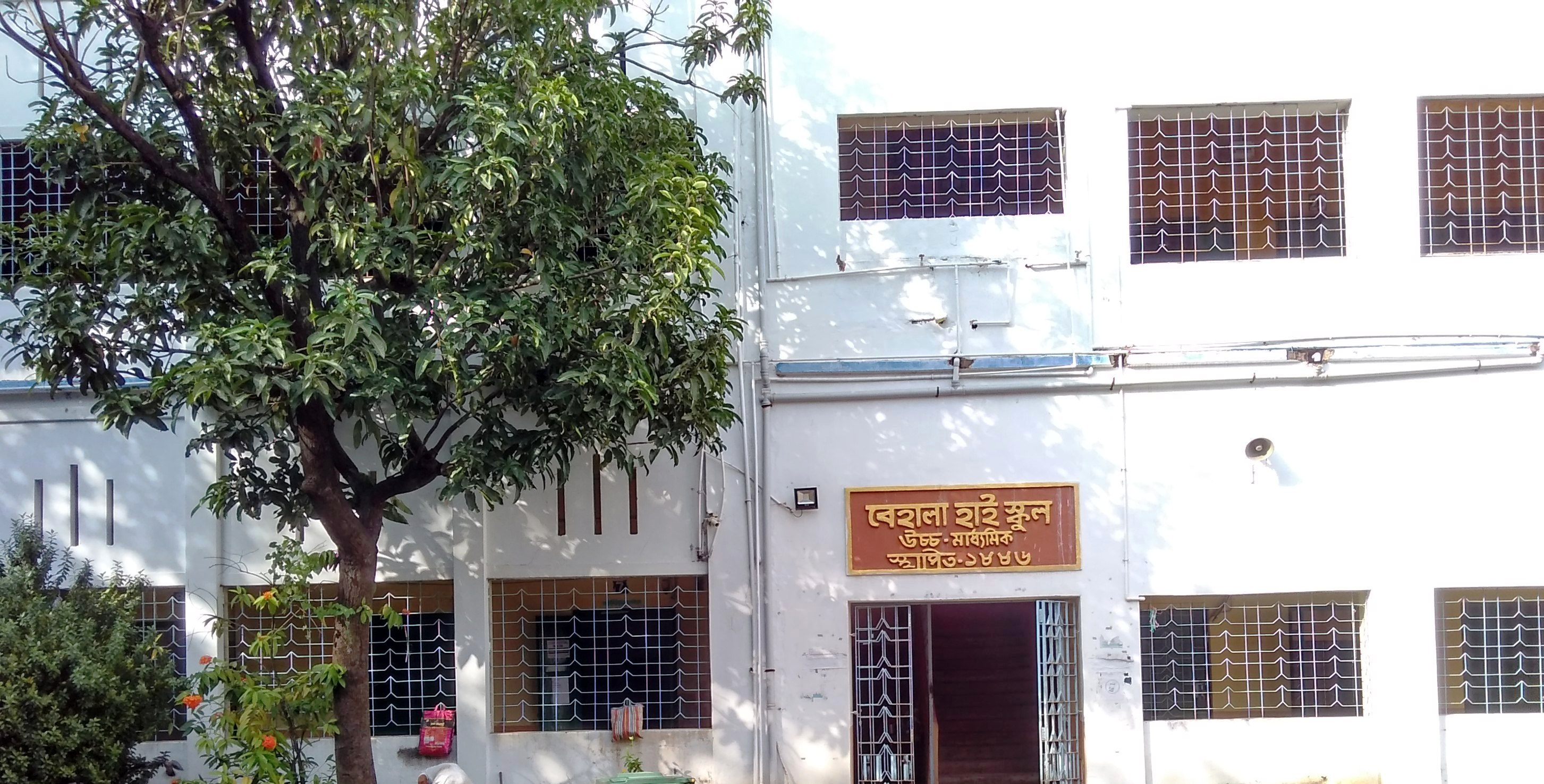
Behala High School Building

Behala High School is a school located at Behala, Kolkata, India. This is a boys' school and is affiliated to the West Bengal Board of Secondary Education for Madhyamik Pariksha (10th Board exams), and to the West Bengal Council of Higher Secondary Education for Higher Secondary Examination (12th Board exams). The school was established in 1886.

== Departments of Higher Secondary ==
- Science
- Arts
- Commerce

== See also ==
- List of schools in Kolkata
