= Barisha Girls' High School =

Coordinates: 22°28′49.13″N 88°18′22.02″E

Location
- Kolkata, West Bengal; India

Information
- Established: 8 January 1917
- School district: Kolkata
- Principal: Kaberi Ghoshal
- Grades: 1–12
- Gender: Girls

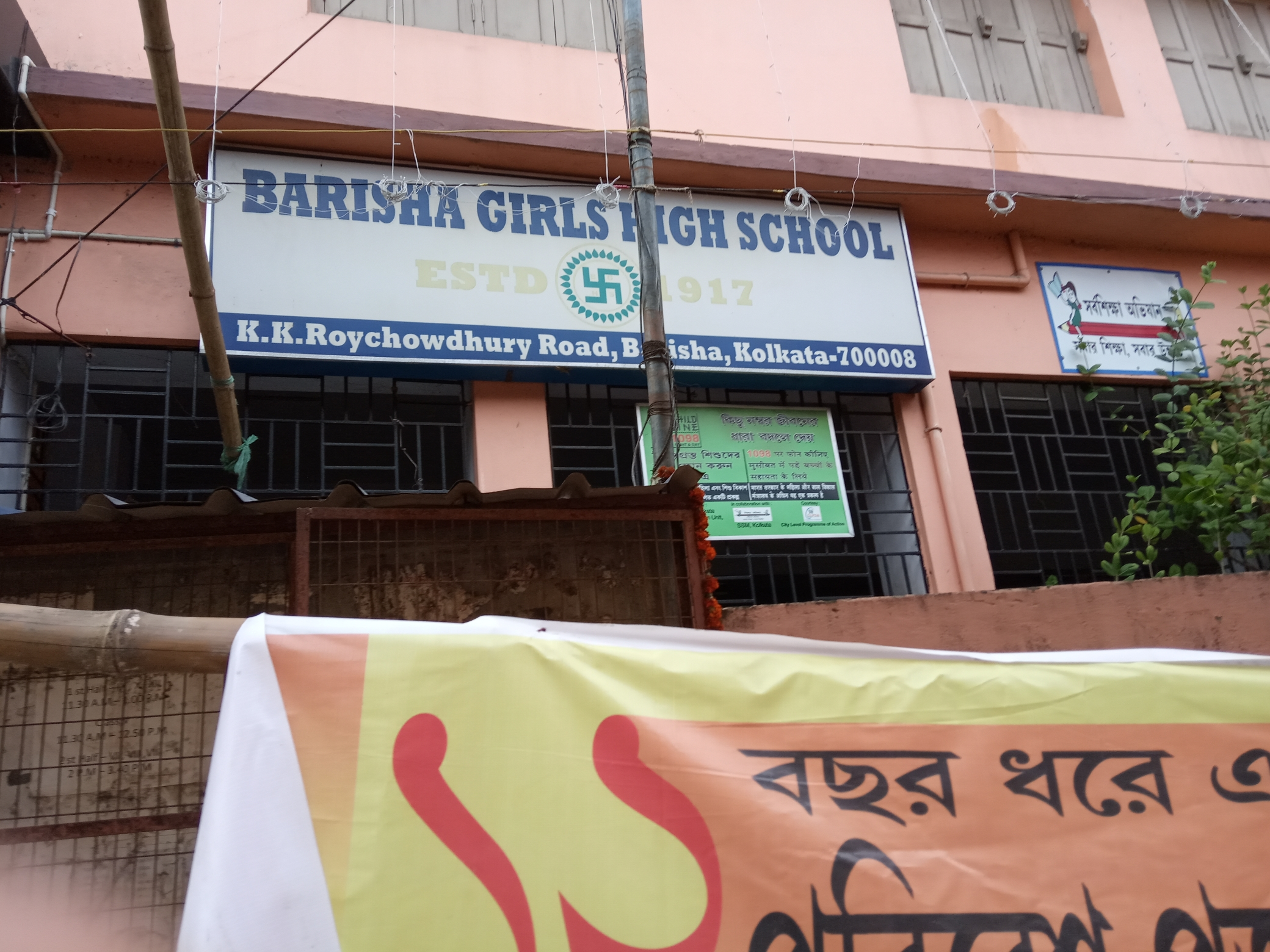
This is the photo of Barisha Girls' High School located in Barisha, Behala in Kolkata City.

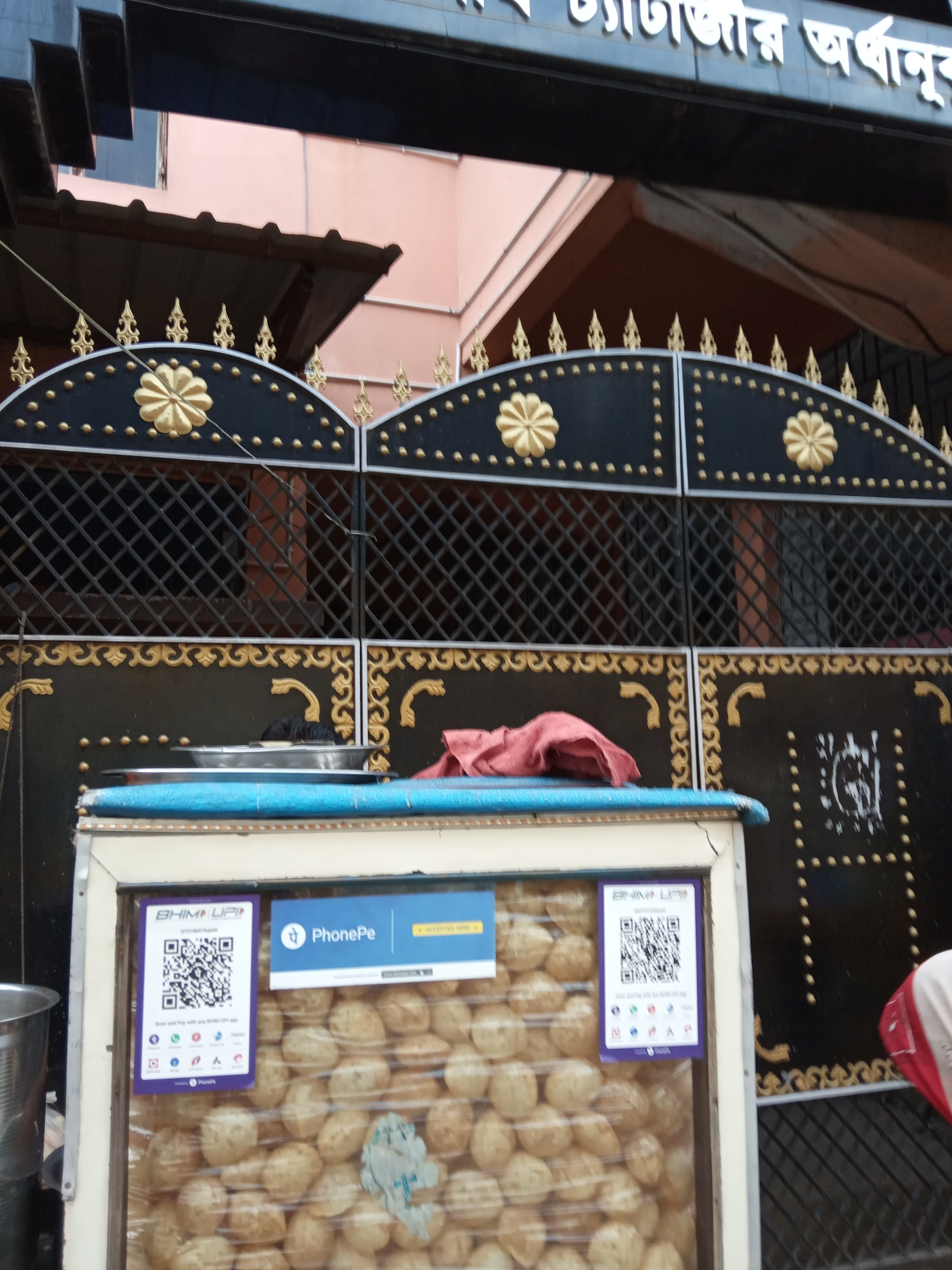
This is the photo of the entrance gate of Barisha Girls' High School

Barisha Girls' High School is a school located at Paschim Barisha, Kolkata, India. This is a girls' school and is affiliated to the West Bengal Board of Secondary Education for Madhyamik Pariksha (10th Board exams), and to the West Bengal Council of Higher Secondary Education for Higher Secondary Examination (12th Board exams). The school was established in 1917 January 8.

== See also ==
- List of schools in Kolkata
