= Barisha High School =

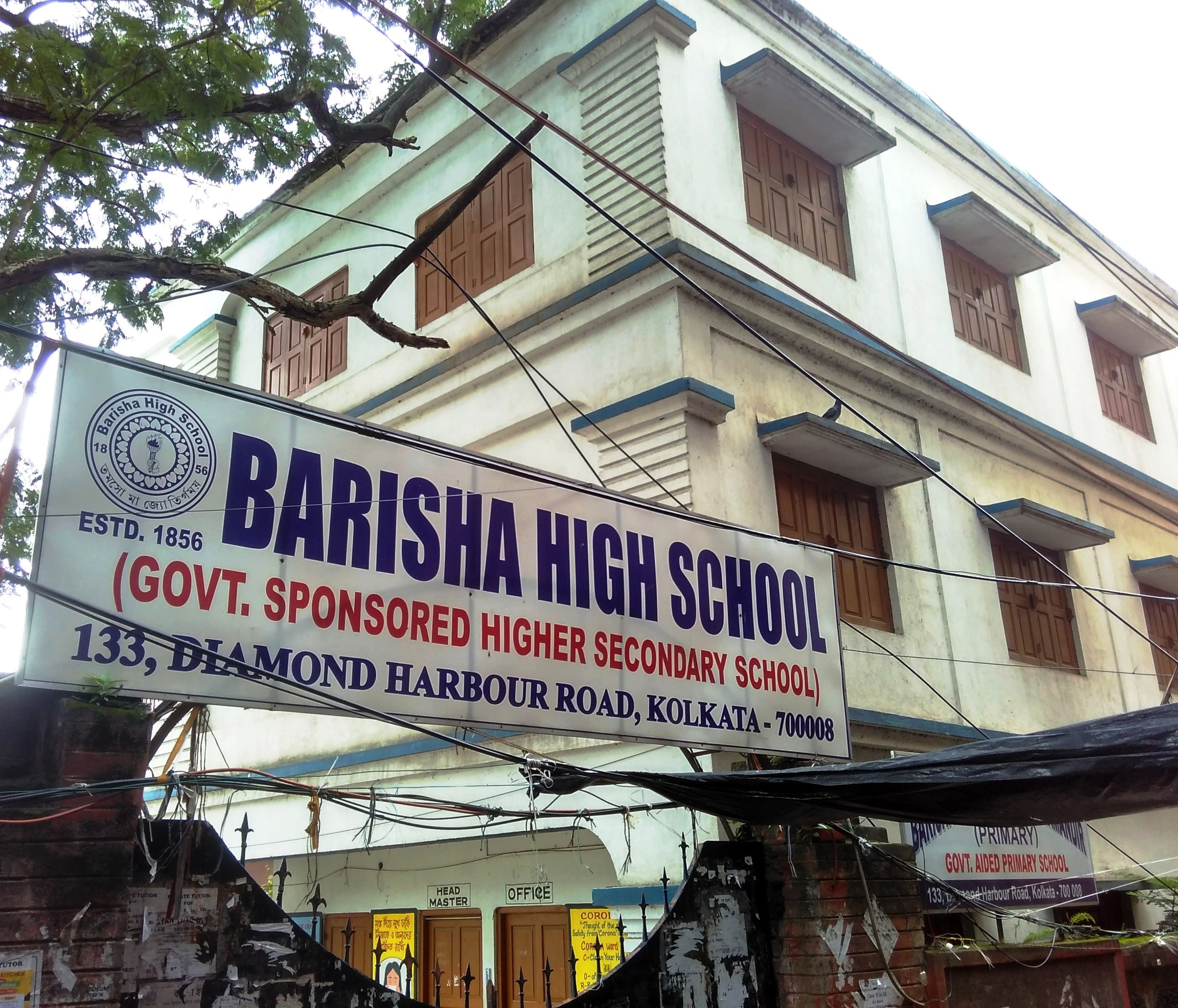
- Barisha High School

Location
- 133, Diamond Harbour Rd, Behala Chowrasta, Jadu Colony, Barisha; Kolkata, West Bengal, 700008; India
- Coordinates: 22.4878346°N 88.3133314°E

Information
- Type: Govt sponsored
- Established: 1856

Barisha High School (BHS) is a school located at Diamond Harbour road, Behala, Kolkata, India. This is a boys' school and is affiliated to the West Bengal Board of Secondary Education for Madhyamik Pariksha (10th Board exams), and to the West Bengal Council of Higher Secondary Education for Higher Secondary Examination (12th Board exams).

== History ==
The school was established in 1856 by Pandit Ishwar Chandra Vidyasagar. The school was established even one year before the establishment of the Calcutta University. The School is one of ancient school in West Bengal. Barisha High School is a famous school in South Kolkata and West Bengal and over centuries has produced many recognized people in different fields.

== Academics ==
The school offers a common curriculum up to Grade 10, along with the option of National & Regional languages. In Grade 11 and Grade 12, the school requires students to choose one of three five-subject streams: Commerce, Humanities or Science.

== Student life ==
=== Athletics ===
The school sends teams for basketball, football (soccer), and cricket tournaments, and has facilities for a football ground. Sports training is conducted after school hours.

The football team has won, and finished as first runners-up in several national, zonal and inter-school tournaments. Students have represented West Bengal State in various age groups and have been selected for the Bengal under-16 football team

=== Exchange programs ===
The school has hosted academic and cultural exchange programs.

== See also ==
- Education in India
- List of schools in India
- Education in West Bengal
- List of schools in Kolkata
