= Binodini Girls' High School =

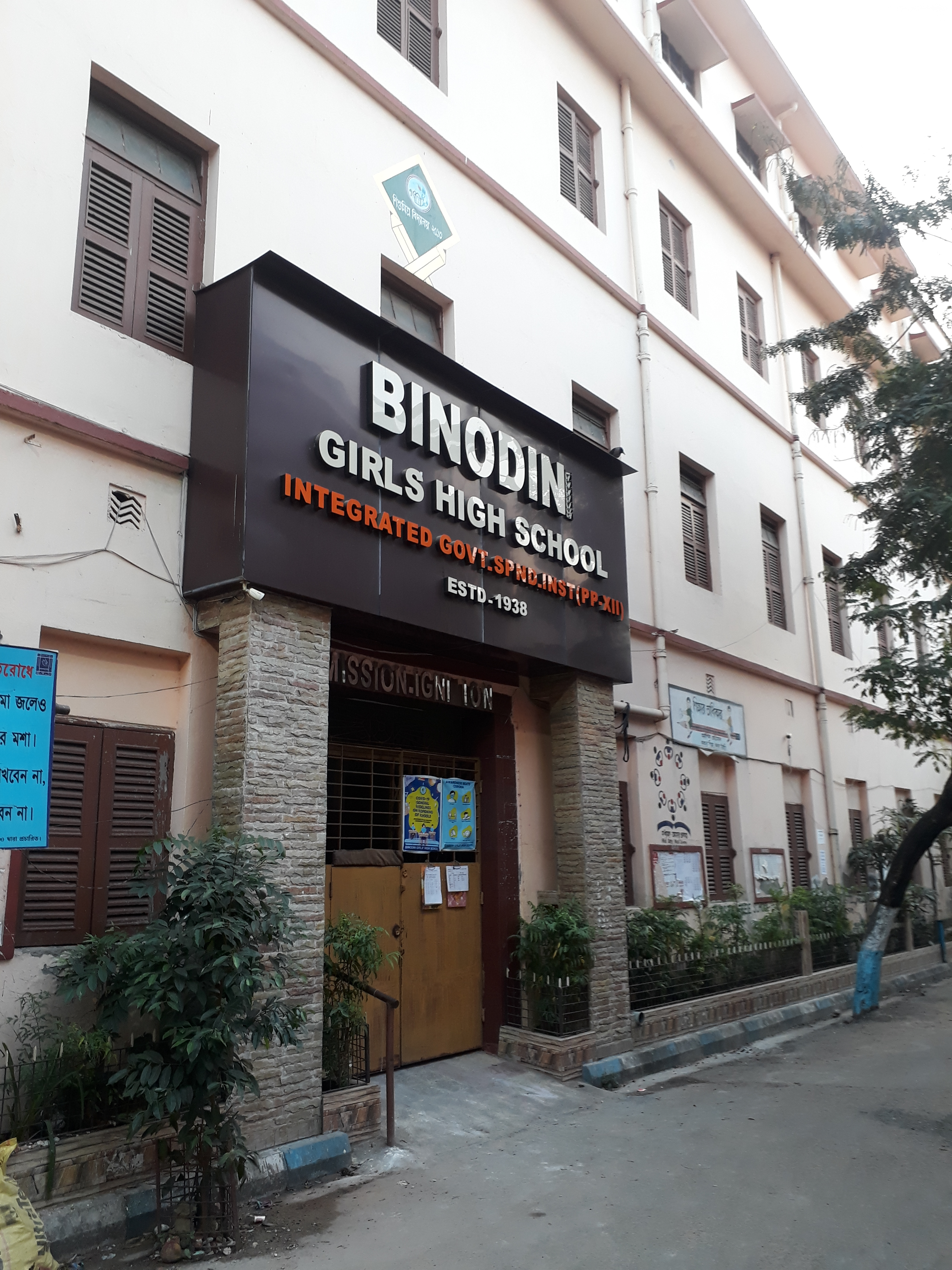

Location
- 2, Bank Plot, Dhakuria Kali Bari Lane; Kolkata, West Bengal; India; 22°30′31.23″N 88°22′02.95″E

Information
- Type: Higher secondary
- Established: 1938
- Headmistress: Dipanwita Roy Chowdhury
- Language: Bengali
- Campus: Urban
- Affiliations: WBBSE & WBCHSE
- Website: Official website

Binodini Girls High School is a girls high school located at Dhakuria, Kolkata, in the Indian state of West Bengal. It is affiliated to the West Bengal Board of Secondary Education for Madhyamik Pariksha (10th Board exams) and to the West Bengal Council of Higher Secondary Education for Higher Secondary Examination (12th Board exams). The school was established in 1938.

== See also ==
- List of schools in Kolkata
