= Amritlal Ojha =

Amritlal Ojha (1890–1944) was a noted coal miner and businessman from Calcutta, India.

== Early life ==
Amritlal was born on June 22, 1890 at Anjar to Laljee Ojha. He belonged to the Gujarati family of Brahmin caste. They were known as 'Lotani' family of Anjar, Kutch. He obtained his education first at a native school and subsequently at Morvi. Early in life he tried several jobs even as a teacher in Anjar. He later worked under a Parsi railway contractor with his father, when in 1905, Nagda to Mathura railway lines were opened. Here they came in close contact with various Mistri railway contractors, who also belonged to Anjar, Kutch. Some of them invited them to Jharia after completion of railway lines in 1908.

== Career ==
Amritlal's father came to Jharia in the year 1908 and joined Mistri Khimjee Moljee & Company's Joyrampur Colliery. The owner was Khimee Moolji Jethwa of Anjar from Mistri community of Kutch. Sometime later he called his son Amritlal also to Jharia and arranged a job for him at Mistri Khengarji Trikoo & Son's Khas Joyrampur colliery at a salary of Rs 31/- per month, which was raised to Rs. 70/- very soon looking into his competence.

Khengarji Trikoo was owned by Khengarji Trikoo Padhiyar of Anjar and his son Nanji Khengarji. They also belonged to Mistri community of Kutch. The Mistris of Kutch were pioneering Indians in Jharia coalfields, led by Seth Khora Ramji and in the 1900s held influential control of collieries and in the local politics of Jharia. Soon Amritlal became a close associate and confidante of the employers earning them huge profits by his acumen. Khengarji offered him a partnership with a view to retaining him and a new firm was opened in name of Khengarji Amritlal & Company. Initially, Jote Dhamo Colliery was purchased as joint venture of Nanji Khengarji Trikoo and Amritlal Ojha in the year 1919, which was a huge success. The success in the coal business enabled him to buy a piece of coal land about 500 bighas- in 1920 near Raniganj. A little later, another colliery was purchased in partnership with Nanji Khengarji and also opened at Joyrampur and a liaison office was opened in Calcutta for coal trading business. However, in 1928, the partnership business went into legal dispute with family of Khengarji Trikoo claiming that Amritlal sold a part of the coal mines to another party without their consent and knowledge. Amritlal lost the case in Supreme Court of India in 1939 and had to pay the damages to Ratilal Nanji, son of Nanji Khengarji. Thus the joint venture Khengarji Amritlal & Company came to an end with bitter note and as a black spot on Amritlal's otherwise illustrious business career.

== Shifting to Calcutta ==
However, by this time Amritlal had amassed enough wealth. He shifted to Calcutta around 1929–30 and started his own firm Amritlal & Sons and Amritlal Ojha & Company with offices at Calcutta and Bombay, which were later converted into limited companies. Further, there was a firm named Ojha Brothers.

He built a palatial mansion at Allenby Road in Bhawanipore and named it Ojha Mansion and family shifted there.

=== Collieries in Ranigunj coalfields ===
He concentrated on his sole proprietorship collieries, Guzdar Kajora Colliery located at Kajoragram in Burdwan district, which he had purchased in 1921. He also took several other coal mines on lease like East Sitalpur Colliery, East Bansdeopur Coal mines and others. There were at least 14 collieries under their management at a point of time.

=== Cotton mills ===
He also took on lease mills such as the Hattersley Mill Co in Bombay, which he ran till 1940. The mill was owned by Gwalior State. The State gifted the mill to the Government of India in 1940.

=== Import-export and agency business ===
He also started import export business and exported coal, rice and other products. He also took agencies of various consumer products as an importer. They were distributor for Shalimar biscuits for Eastern India.

=== Safe Deposit Vault ===
He also built multi-storied complex Security House at Calcutta as his head office, which stands at Netaji Subhas Road, Kolkata. He also started Calcutta Safe Deposit Vault Ltd at Security House at Calcutta, which was one of the safest vault of those times located under the ground of building. The vault was modelled on safe deposit centres in London that Ojha had come across during a visit to Europe in the early 1930s. The vault opened in January, 1940 is still in operation. It was one of the first private vaults of Kolkata and Ojha had to travel to London start this venture, as initially the permission starting such private vault was denied by British. Sir Badridas Goenka served as the first chairman of this company and other elites of town like Nalini Ranjan Sarkar, Maharaja of Burdwan, royal families of Sikkim apart from British and Europeans, patronized it once upon a time. Even Dalai Lama held a vault here. Outside these vaults today, a statue of him stands, and it enlists his message: “My dream at last has taken shape. For years I had felt the need for security at low cost and risk borne collectively in the premier city of India. When I look at the uncertain times ahead and the growing necessity for safety, I feel the safe deposit vault will render invaluable service to the common man of this great province.”

=== Sugar mills ===
Amritlal Ojha also purchased a sugar mill at Burma in 1931 and floated two companies to manage it - Amritlal Ojha & Co. (Burma) Ltd and Burma Ainrit Sugar Mills Ltd.

=== Insurance ===
He also founded an insurance company - Great Social Life and General Insurance Company in early 1943. The company was opened with patronage of the Jamsahib Sri Digvijaysinhji of Nawanagar and other directors included Pranlal Devkaran Nanjee, Dhanjishaw J. Poonawala, Fazalbhoy Ibrahim Rahimtoola, Jeshtaram Kapadia, Mohmmadbhoy Dawjee Dadabhoy and Vasantray Amritlal Ojha.

== Public life ==
He was one of the founders of Geological, Mining and Metallurgical Society of India, which was founded in 1924. He served as executive committee member of the Geological Society from 1924 till his death in 1944 and presided over it for the years 1928-29 and 1928-30 In 1930, he attended International Labour Conference as Employers delegate. He was also one of the founders of the Indian Chamber of Commerce, Calcutta and also later served as its President and Chairman in 1933-34. He also served as Chairman of the Indian Mining Federation, was the President of the Federation of Indian Chambers of Commerce & Industry for years 1940-41. He was a member of the Bihar and Orissa Legislative Council in 1926; President of the Bengal National Chamber of Commerce & Industry, member of the Mining Board and was one of the founders of The Indian Colliery Owners' Association. He objected and wrote a letter to Sir Purushottamdas Thakurdas, when it was known that Thakurdas had opposed allocation of Jute Export Duty to Bengal.

== Philanthropy ==
Amritlal Ojha was also a philanthropist and helped to fund Calcutta Anglo-Gujarati School, donated land for Bhawanipoure Education Society College and family funded Shree Bhawanipur Gujarati Balmandir at Calcutta and served in various posts of these school committees. Also in Gujarat helped to start a girls school at Anjar and one at Morvi.

== Death and successors ==
He died aged 54, on October 18, 1944 when he was at the peak of his business career. Among his successors, mainly his sons, Vasantray Amritlal Ojha, Bhupatray Amritlal Ojha & Keshavlal Amritlal Ojha, along with a relative and a key personnel of the company named Jyantilal Manishankar Ojha, are noted for taking reins of Ojha group. In 1946 Ojha family started New Shampore Coal Co with partnership with Seth Khora Ramji's family and Dhanji Ratanji.

The Ojha business group suffered major set back after nationalization of coal mines in 1971–73, due to internal disputes and losses in other arms of their business.
