= Bidya Bharati Girls' High School =

School in Kolkata, India

Bidya Bharati Girls' High School is an English Medium girls' school located at New Alipore, Kolkata, India. The school was established in 1965, by Vidya Bharati Society for Educational & Scientific Advancement and is affiliated to the West Bengal Board of Secondary Education for Madhyamik Pariksha (10th Board exams), and to the West Bengal Council of Higher Secondary Education for Higher Secondary Examination (12th Board exams). The school has been ranked 3rd by Times of India School Rankings Survey as one of the Top Schools in the Greater South Academic Zones of Kolkata.

== History ==
The Vidya - Bharati Society for Educational and Scientific Advancement was formed under the guidance of Late Shri P.K Das Gupta and his wife Late Smt. Bharati Das Gupta way back in 1965, registered under West Bengal Societies Act XXII of 1961.

The primary objective of the Society was to establish an institute of repute, which will provide a well-oriented education system for the girls of Kolkata and its suburbs.

The Society founded Bidya Bharati School(English Medium) on 2 November 1965 at New Alipore. In 1967 the School got its first Affiliation as Junior High School and then in 1968 the West Bengal Board of Secondary Education recognized it as High School.

In the year 1999 Bidya Bharati was upgraded to a Higher Secondary School duly affiliated to West Bengal Council for Higher Secondary Education.

The School which started with 5 students has now grown into a renowned institution with three units. The High-School (V – XII) alone has a student strength of 2200. In January 1999, Late Shri S S Agarwal became the president of the Vidya-Bharati Society For Education & Scientific Advancement and upgraded the school to its Higher Secondary level. The Society now has Mr. Mukul Agarwal as the President and Mr. S.K Poddar as the Secretary. The Managing Committee of Bidya Bharati Girls’ High School as has its Honorary Secretary Smt. Purnima Mukherjee, the Ex-Headmistress of Bidya Bharati Girls’ High School and Mr. B.N Jain as its president.

== The School ==
The school has three units (Mominpore, Behala and New Alipore).

== The Mominpore Unit ==
The Mominpore unit used to have only the kindergarten section. Since 2001, the primary section was also introduced in there.

== The Behala Unit ==
Like the Mominpore Unit, the Behala Unit used to only have the primary sections of the school. Since 2001, the kindergarten section was also introduced.

== The New Alipore Unit ==
The New Alipore Unit holds the secondary section of the school (V - XII). It is located opposite to India Government Mint, Kolkata. Here the entire secondary section is divided into two shifts. Class V - VII comes in morning shift whereas class VIII - XII comes in afternoon shift.

== School Houses ==
There are four school houses.

- Pioneer - (Green)
- Glory - (Yellow)
- Virtue - (Blue)
- Flame - (Red)

Each house has a captain, a Vice-Captain and a Prefect. Each house is assisted by teachers.
Each of them competes against one another in Sports, Duties and Academics. On the day of the Annual Function, the House with the maximum points is declared "House of the Year" on the basis of points earned by students during the academic year.

== Curriculum ==
Students may choose to study Science (Physics, chemistry, Mathematics/Biology/Economics, Statistics), Commerce (Accounts, Commerce, Mathematics/Business studies, Economics) or Humanities (History/Geography, Economics/Psychology, Mathematics/Home Sc., Political Sc.). Either Hindi/Bengali should be taken a compulsory subject.

Also the School inspires her students to indulge in many extra-curricular activities throughout the year which helps to build up a students' personality.

== See also ==
- List of schools in Kolkata
