= Jagatpur Rukmini Vidyamandir =

School in Kolkata, West Bengal, India

Location
- 14, Satyen Roy Branch Rd, Indrajit Pally, Behala; Kolkata, West Bengal, 700034; India; 22.4961484°N 88.3235434°E

Information
- Established: 1953
- Affiliation: West Bengal Board of Secondary Education

Jagatpur Rukmini Vidyamandir is a school located at Behala, Kolkata, India.

== History ==
This is a boys' school and was established in 1953. The school is affiliated to the West Bengal Board of Secondary Education for Madhyamik Pariksha (10th Board exams), and to the West Bengal Council of Higher Secondary Education for Higher Secondary Examination (12th Board exams).

== Incidents ==
In May 2012, some students held the teachers hostage for 21 hours demanding they should be declared promoted in their pre-board exams despite failing in them. In December 2012, two teachers of the school were physically assaulted by some students and their parents, because they didn't agree to accept their demand that all students who have failed in their secondary and higher secondary pre tests, must be declared promoted.

In March 2025, there was theft of cash from the office locker of Jagatpur Rukmini Vidyamandir, along with some other school sin the adjoining area.

== See also ==
- Education in India
- List of schools in India
- Education in West Bengal
- List of schools in Kolkata
