= Nava Nalanda High School =

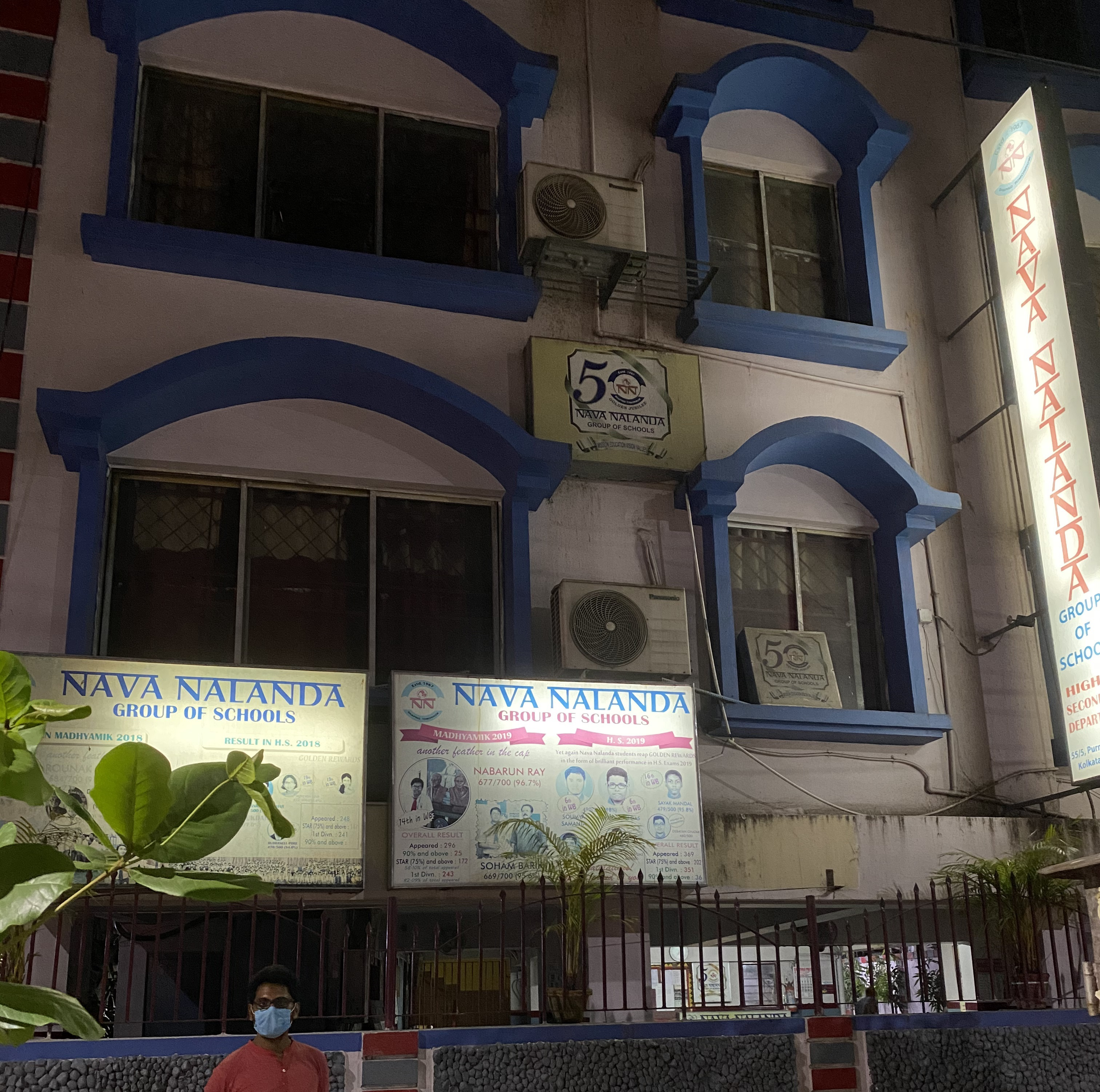

Location
- 25, Southern Avenue; Kolkata, 700026; India

Information
- School type: Co educational English Medium School
- Motto: Mission Education, Vision Values
- Established: 1967
- Founder: Arya Mitra and Bharati Mitra
- School code: A3-066 (WBBSE) & 101324 (WBCHSE)
- Rector: Arya Mitra
- Headmaster: Arijit Mitra
- Grades: Nursery – I to Class XII
- Age range: 03 to 18
- Average class size: 30
- Language: English
- Colours: White, grey and red
- Slogan: Shaping Tomorrow
- National ranking: 93

Nava Nalanda High School is a private co-educational institution in South Kolkata, India, affiliated to the West Bengal Board of Secondary Education for Madhyamik Pariksha (10th Board exams), and to the West Bengal Council of Higher Secondary Education for Uchcho Madhyamik Pariksha (12th Board exams). It was founded on 1 February 1967 by Bharati Mitra & Arya Mitra.

== Sport ==
Nava Nalanda High School has won the CAB Mayor's Cup Cricket (U-15) in 2018 as well as 2019. The School scored 844 runs in 45 overs against Gyan Bharati Vidyalaya, on 22 February 2016, to set a record score for a Cricket Association of Bengal school cricket tournament. They won the match by a record 812 runs. Nava Nalanda School broke that record again when they went on to score 1067 runs in 45 overs against Nopany High School in 2023 Mayor's cup which stands as a record in West Bengal school cricket. They won the match by 1063 runs as they bundled out the opposition for a paltry score of 4 runs.

== Notable alumni ==
- Lagnajita Chakraborty, singer
- Aneek Dhar, singer
- Prosit Roy, film director
- Poulomi Ghatak, table tennis player
- Mimi Mondal, writer
- Raja Venkat, cricketer
- Abhishek Banerjee, Politician
- Deblina Sarkar, Inventor
- Srijan Bhattacharya, Politician

== See also ==
- List of schools in Kolkata
- List of schools in West Bengal
