= Sri Sarada Math =

Hindu nunnery

Sri Sarada Math is a convent named after Sri Sarada Devi, the consort of Sri Ramakrishna, founded on 2 December 1954. Headquartered at Dakshineshwar, Kolkata, the organisation has 35 branch centres in other parts of India, and in Sri Lanka and Australia. The nuns use the title "Pravrajika" before their ordained name, and are usually addressed as "Mataji" meaning 'revered mother'.

Sri Sarada Math also stands as the first monastic institution for Hindu women fully governed by women and without any interference from men. It was born as envisioned by Swami Vivekananda to revive the status of Hindu women in spiritual realm in the footsteps of Gargi and Maitreyi.

== Overview ==
Sri Sarada Math is the monastic order for women established as an independent counterpart to Ramakrishna Order. The main aim of the organisation is to fulfill the mission of Swami Vivekananda, that is 'Shiva Jnane Jiva Seva' serving God in Man, irrespective of caste, creed, and nationality as well as the upliftment and empowerment of women.

The organisation mainly propagates the Hindu philosophy of Vedanta–Advaita Vedanta and four yogic ideals–Jnana, Bhakti, Karma, and Raja Yoga.

Apart from religious and spiritual teaching, the organisation carries out educational and philanthropic work in India. The Sri Sarada Math and its sister organisation, the Ramakrishna Sarada Mission, publish many Vedanta and Ramakrishna-Vivekananda texts. Ramakrishna Sarada Mission, its sister organisation also shares the same headquarters at Dakshineshwar, Kolkata.

== History ==
2 December 1954, the Sarada Math was inaugurated.

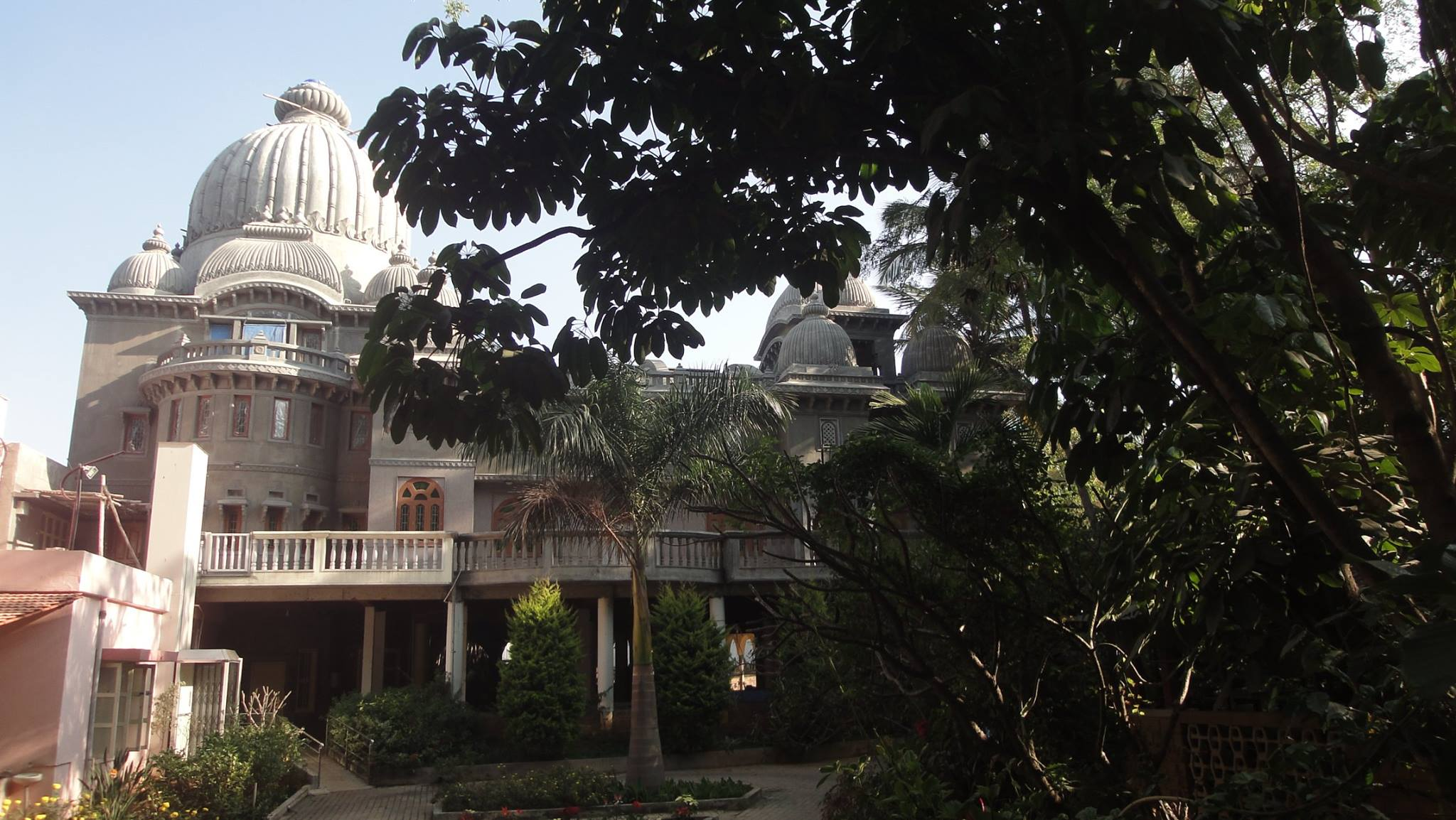
Sri Sarada Math at Nandi Durg Road, Bengaluru

From 1954 to 1958 Sri Sarada Math was a branch centre of the Ramakrishna Math at Belur. The Trustees of Belur Math assumed the responsibility of its administration.

On 1 January 1959, the birth anniversary of Sri Sarada Devi, eight Brahmacharinis of the women's Math were ordained into formal Sannyasa and given new names prefixed by 'Pravrajika' and ending with 'prana'. Sri Bharati, the President of the Sarada Math was given the name, Pravrajika Bharatiprana. The others seven brahmacharinis were named as Pravrajikas Muktiprana, Dayaprana, Vidyaprana, Shraddhaprana, Bhaktiprana and Medhaprana.

On 26 August 1959, the Sri Sarada Math was recognised as an independent organisation and the full administration was handed over to the nuns. Seven of its nuns were elected to be the Trustees. The Trust deed was registered on 9 September 1959 and it was officially registered as a non-government trust on 11 September 1959. With this an independent Order of Sannyasinis was created.

Sankaracharya did not sanction sannyasa for women.

== Motto ==
The motto of Ramakrishna Math and Mission, 'Atmano Mokshartham Jagad Hitaya Ca' is also shared by Sri Sarada Math and Ramakrishna Sarada Mission.

== Work for Women ==
Since its inception, Sri Sarada Math has taken over the major responsibility of uplifting the Indian women which was till then handled by Ramakrishna Math and Ramakrishna Mission. This is especially in the areas of health care and education of women. Following the legal establishment of Ramakrishna Sarada Mission, the two institutions run by the Ramakrishna Mission for women, the Matri Bhavan (maternity hospital) in south Kolkata and the Entally Ashrama, Women's Welfare Centre in central Kolkata were handed over to Ramakrishna Sarada Mission in 1961.

In 1963, the Ramakrishna Mission authorities handed over the Sister Nivedita Girls' School to the Ramakrishna Sarada Mission.

== Presidents ==
1. Pravrajika Bharatiprana
2. Pravrajika Mokshaprana
3. Pravrajika Shraddhaprana
4. Pravrajika Bhaktiprana
5. Pravrajika Anandaprana
6. Pravrajika Premaprana

== Branches ==
=== Sri Lanka ===
Sri Ramakrishna Sarada Samity was started in Colombo in 1970 and in 2006, it became a branch centre of the Sarada Math with a new name as Ramakrishna Sarada Mission (Lanka Branch). Along with spiritual education, this branch also conducts various humanitarian and social welfare activities in Sri Lanka. Its current president is Pravrajika Sushantaprana.

=== Australia ===
The branch centre in Australia, known as (Ramakrishna Sarada) Vedanta Society of New South Wales was formed in 1974. This branch conducts classes, retreats, discussions on meditation, Yoga, Vedanta, and observe some Hindu festival celebration. Its current president is Pravrajika Gayatriprana.

== Publications ==
Nibodhata, is its Bengali journal published every two months.

Samvit is its English journal, first published in 1980.
