= Mahatma Gandhi School (disambiguation) =

Mahatma Gandhi School may refer to:

- Barasat Mahatma Gandhi Memorial High School in Barasat, West Bengal, India
- Mahatma Gandhi International School, Pasay, Philippines
- Mahatma Gandhi Memorial High School in Fiji
- The Gandhi High School in Pecs, Hungary

== See also ==
- Mahatma Gandhi International School (disambiguation)
