= Bidhannagar Municipal School =

- বিধাননগর মিউনিসিপ্যাল স্কুল

Location
- FE, 175/1, Fourth Ave, FE Block, Sector 3 Salt Lake City; Kolkata, West Bengal 700106; India; 22°34′57″N 88°25′8″E

Information
- School type: Self financed - Tuition & Other fees from guardians., Self financed, affiliated by W.B.Board High school (Eng, Bengali -CoEducation)
- Motto: श्रद्धावान लभते ज्ञानम् (The believer attains knowledge)
- Established: 1997
- Principal: Bhaswati Chakraborty
- Teaching staff: 100
- Grades: Pre primary to 12th Grade.
- Gender: Co-Ed (Eng, Beng both)
- Age range: 4+ years to 16 years
- Enrolment: 2500 + (approx)
- Education system: W. B . B. S. E & W. B. C. H. S. E curriculum
- Language: Bengali, English
- Hours in school day: Morning, Day section.
- Classrooms: 40
- Houses: Red Blue Green Yellow White
- Fandom: BMSIANS
- Colors: Blue and Yellow
- Athletics: Yes
- Sports: Football, Cricket, Kabaddi
- Yearbook: Pratuysh
- Affiliations: West Bengal Board of Secondary Education, West Bengal Council of Higher Secondary Education

Bidhannagar Municipal School is a school in Bidhannagar (Salt Lake City), Kolkata, India. It is affiliated to West Bengal Board of Secondary Education and West Bengal Council of Higher Secondary Education

== History ==
The school was founded in 1997, with the first classes being held in Acharya Prafulla Chandra School, BK Block, Salt Lake. The school moved to its new building in FE Block soon afterwards. The inauguration ceremony was on 1 July 1999, led by the then West Bengal Hon’ble Finance Minister Dr. Ashim Dasgupta and Hon’ble Higher Education Minister Satyasadhan Chakraborty.

The four-story building has a triangular shape with a small courtyard in the middle. A playground is beside the main building. The school has laboratories and equipment for sports. It encourages students to take part in cultural programmes and inter-school competition, including painting, debate and chess competitions.

The school's principal since 2010 is Bhaswati Chakraborty. In 2015, the school gave Chakraborty a notice asking her to become the principal of the primary section only, but she refused and filed a lawsuit. In 2022, some posters maligning the school's principal were found on the walls, having supposedly been put up at around 4:30am while the CCTV cameras were blocked.

== Student life ==
The school has a primary department and a high school department up to 12th standard. It gives its students the option to study in Bengali or English. At the +2 level, there are Science, Humanities and Commerce streams.

Students participate in an intra-school cultural event and competition every year known as the Shikhharthi Utsav (students' festival), and Foundation Day is celebrated every year on 1 July. Football championships, kabaddi competitions, quizzes, debate competition and an annual sports day are held.

== See also ==
- List of schools in Kolkata
