= Holy Child Institute =

Roman Catholic school in Kolkata, India

Location
- Abhedanandan road, Beadon Street, Kolkata, India, West Bengal, 700006; 22°35′18″N 86°22′15″E

Information
- School type: Government
- Established: 1834; 192 years ago
- School board: WBBSE ও WBCHSE
- Gender: Male
- Affiliation: West Bengal Board of Secondary Education; West Bengal Council of Higher Secondary Education
- Website: hcikolkata.org

Holy Child Institute is a girls' higher secondary school situated in Abhedananda Road, Beadon Street, Kolkata is a Roman Catholic secondary school affiliated to the West Bengal Board of Secondary Education. Established on 1 January 1956, the school is administered by the Sisters of Charity of Calcutta Province.

== About ==
The school is at 1, Abhedananda Rd, Manicktala, Azad Hind Bag, Kolkata, West Bengal 700006.

In 2005 a staff member at the school was named as a Shining Star Employee in the Telegraph School Awards for Excellence.

== Admission ==
Admission in the institute can be taken in three classes, in KG; V; and 10. Admission forms are maid available in the month of September every year.

== Facilities ==
There are several facilities to enhance the learning and betterment of the students. Some are mentioned below-

- Computer lab
- Physics lab
- Chemistry lab
- Projector
- Smart classroom

== Sports and co-curricular activities ==
There is a field for student sports, located just in front of the main building. The ground is used for organizing the school's annual sports competitions, inter-class sports competitions. Also, Science & Arts exhibitions are held in the school.

== See also ==
- List of schools in Kolkata
- List of schools in West Bengal
