= Baruipur High School =

School in Baruipur, West Bengal, India

Location
- Puratan Bazar, Maha Prabhu Tala, Baruipur, West Bengal; Kolkata – 700144; India
- Coordinates: 22.34696040915205°N 88.44155452126962°E

Information
- School type: Government Secondary School
- Established: 1858
- Authority: Government of West Bengal
- Enrollment: 2350
- Language: English, Bengali
- Affiliation: WBBSE and WBCHSE
- Website: https://baruipurhighschool.com/

Baruipur High School (BHS) is a government high school for boys, located in Baruipur, West Bengal, India. This is a boys' only school for secondary and higher secondary level students. It is one of the deemed schools in Kolkata. The campus includes a fairly large play-ground and the school offers variety of extracurricular activities for its students.

== History ==
The school was established in 1858 by British just after the year of the historical Sepoy Mutiny. The School is one of ancient school in West Bengal. BHS is a famous school in South Kolkata and West Bengal and over centuries has produced many recognised people in different fields.

== Academics ==
Baruipur High School is affiliated with the West Bengal Board of Secondary Education (WBBSE) and West Bengal Council of Higher Secondary Education(WBCHSE). The school offers a common curriculum up to Grade 10, along with the option of National & Regional languages. In Grade 11 and Grade 12, the school requires students to choose one of three five-subject streams: Science (with Computer Science or Biology), Commerce, or Arts.

== Notable alumni ==
- Jyotirmay Bhattacharya – Former Chief Justice, Calcutta High Court
- Subhankar Chattopadhyay – Director, Scriptwriter, Content creator, and Producer

== See also ==
- List of schools in Kolkata
- List of schools in West Bengal
