= NDHS =

NDHS may refer to:

- Narkeldanga High School, Kolkata, India
- National Disaster Housing Strategy
- New Dorp High School, New York City, United States
- North Davidson High School, Welcome, North Carolina, United States
- North Division High School (Milwaukee), Wisconsin, United States
- North Dorchester High School, Hurlock, Maryland, United States
- Norwood District High School, Norwood, Ontario, Canada
- Notre Dame High School (disambiguation)
