= Pravrajika Mokshaprana =

Former president of the Sharada Math

Pravrajika Mokshaprana, born Renuka Basu (9 December 1915 – 30 August 1999), was the second President of the Sri Sarada Math and the Ramakrishna Sarada Mission. In Hinduism, Sri Sarada Math is the monastic Order for women established as an independent counterpart to the Ramakrishna Order.

During a 26-year career of spiritual ministration, she initiated thousands of people. Before she became President of the Sri Sarada Math, she was headmistress of Sister Nivedita's Girls' School from 1946 to 1948, part of a life-long interest in women's education, as envisaged by Swami Vivekananda.

After Sri Sarada Math and the Ramakrishna Sarada Mission were established, Pravrajika Mokshaprana became the Vice President and the Secretary and Headmistress of Shiksha Mandir, a branch centre of the Ramakrishna Sarada Mission at Baruipara in Kolkata. Under Pravrajika Mokshaprana's presidency, the Sri Sarada Math and the Ramakrishna Sarada Mission continued the expansion which had started in the time of Pravrajika Bharatiprana, with new centres opened across India. As President, Mokshaprana visited all the branch centres in India.

== Early life ==
Renuka Basu, as she was known in her early life, was born on 9 December 1915 to middle-class parents in North Calcutta, Brajendra Nath Basu and Pankajkumari Devi. Brajendranath was an employee of Calcutta Corporation. In childhood, Renuka visited Dakshineswar Temple and Kankurgachi Yogodyan, both dedicated to the life and work of Sri Ramakrishna. After her father died, Renu moved to her maternal uncle's house in Rajabazar with her family. Her uncle, Dr Satyesh Chandra Mitra, introduced Renu to Ramakrishna Mission and Belur Math. She came into contact with Mahapurush Maharaj or Swami Shivananda, a direct disciple of Sri Ramakrishna. Swami Vijnanananda, a direct disciple of Sri Ramakrishna, initiated her into spiritual life in 1935.

In 1942 she passed a Master of Arts in Ancient Indian history and decided to lead a life of celibacy. In 1946 she joined Nivedita School as the headmistress at the request of Swami Nirvedananda, a leading monk of the Ramakrishna Order and the head of Ramakrishna Mission Students Home in Belgharia. She was later given the post of secretary of the same school in 1949.

During this period, Mokshaprana travelled to Benaras, Kankhal, South India, Ceylon, and Kashmir. She met several veteran Sannyasins of the Ramakrishna Order, including Swami Vishuddhananda, Swami Virajananda, Swami Shankarananda, Swami Shantananda and others.

== Sri Sarada Math ==
=== Brahmacharin ===
In 1953, on the 100th birthday of Holy Mother Sri Sarada Devi, Renu was one of seven staff at Sister Nivedita Girls' School and other affiliated organizations to receive the vow of Brahmacharya (celibacy). During this period, Renu received letters from many well-known monks of the Ramakrishna Order, including Swami Premeshananda, the head of Ramakrishna Mission Sevashrama, Sargachi. She relinquished her posts in the Nivedita school and joined Sarala, later known as Pravrajika Bharatiprana, the first president of Sri Sarada Math, as a spiritual inmate of the newly established Math. The new monastery was formed in Dakshineswar, and Renuka was one of the first dedicated workers. In 1959 she received the vow of Sannyas from Swami Shankarananda, president of Belur Math, and took on the name 'Pravrajika Mokshaprana'.

=== Sannyasin ===
Mokshaprana Mataji was elected as a trustee of Sri Sarada Math in 1959, and in 1960, she became the vice president of Math and the Mission. She supervised the construction of a degree college, Vivekananda College, in Dumdum, under Ramakrishna Sarada Mission. She established a charitable dispensary of homeopathic treatments in Dakshineswar, which helped Sri Sarada Math to garner local support for its activities. In 1962 Ramakrishna Siksha Mandir, the second branch of Ramakrishna Sarada Mission, was established in Baruipara Lane near Alambazar, with Mokshaprana as the director and main organiser behind the project. It included a daycare, a junior primary school and a mother teachers' training centre. During the Naxal movement in the 1960s in Bengal, when her school was attacked, she confronted the armed attackers.

=== President ===
In 1973, after the death of Pravrajika Bharatiprana, she became the second president of Sri Sarada Math and Ramakrishna Sarada Mission, responsible for every affair of the Math, as well as the spiritual growth and development of the new Brahmacharins and Sannyasins in the monastery.

Under her stewardship, Sri Sarada Math and Ramakrishna Sarada Mission rapidly expanded. On 14 February 1975, a Sri Sarada Math branch centre was opened in Pune, followed by new centres in Arunachal Pradesh, Bangalore, Trivandrum, Indore, Bhuvaneswar, Haridwar, Almora and one in Australia. New Mission centres were opened in the rural areas of West Bengal like Burdwan, Midnapore and 24 Parganas. As President, Mokshaprana visited all the branch centres in India.

Mokshaprana remained at the head of the organisation for 26 years until her death in 1999. Her devotees included many well-known people, including Ustad Ali Akbar Khan (whose wife Zubeida Khan was her disciple), Ashish Khan, and Sanjib Chattopadhyay. She was a student of ancient history and read widely on many subjects, including literature, astronomy, geography and philosophy.

== Death ==
In November 1998, Mokshaprana was diagnosed with cancer. She remained active until the last months of her life; her last initiation was on 18 July 1998. She died on 30 August 1999, aged 83. Bengali newspaper Anandabazar Patrika reported that many dignitaries and lay devotees had come to see her last rites to pay their respects.
