= B. T. Road Government Sponsored H. S. School =

Public school in Kolkata

Location
- 35/2, Barrackpore Trunk Road, Cossipore, Kolkata, West Bengal - 700002, India; 22°37′33″N 88°22′42″E

Information
- Type: Public
- Established: 1962
- School board: WBBSE; WBCHSE
- School district: Kolkata
- Session: January - December (I - X); June - May (XI - XII)
- School code: A2-008 (WBBSE); 101104 (WBCHSE)
- Head teacher: Sri Dilip Kumar Debnath
- Grades: I - XII
- Gender: Male
- Age range: 6+ to 18+
- Language: Bengali, English
- Campus type: Urban
- Colours: White and Blue (I -X); White and Black (XI - XII)
- Nickname: CIT School

B. T. Road Government Sponsored Higher Secondary School or CIT School is a senior secondary boys' school in Kolkata district of West Bengal, India. Based on its performance of the students in the XIIth standard board examination, the school is considered one of the very best schools in West Bengal.

== History ==
It was established in 1962 at "CIT campus" in Cossipore opposite Rabindra Bharati University. This institution is famous in name "CIT School".

== Courses ==
Higher secondary section of this school offers Arts, Science and Commerce streams.

== Notable alumni ==
- Aritra Dutta Banik, actor

== See also ==
- List of schools in Kolkata
