= Jadavpur Vidyapith =

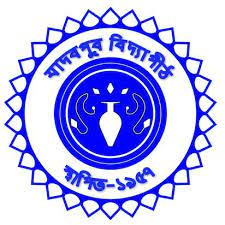

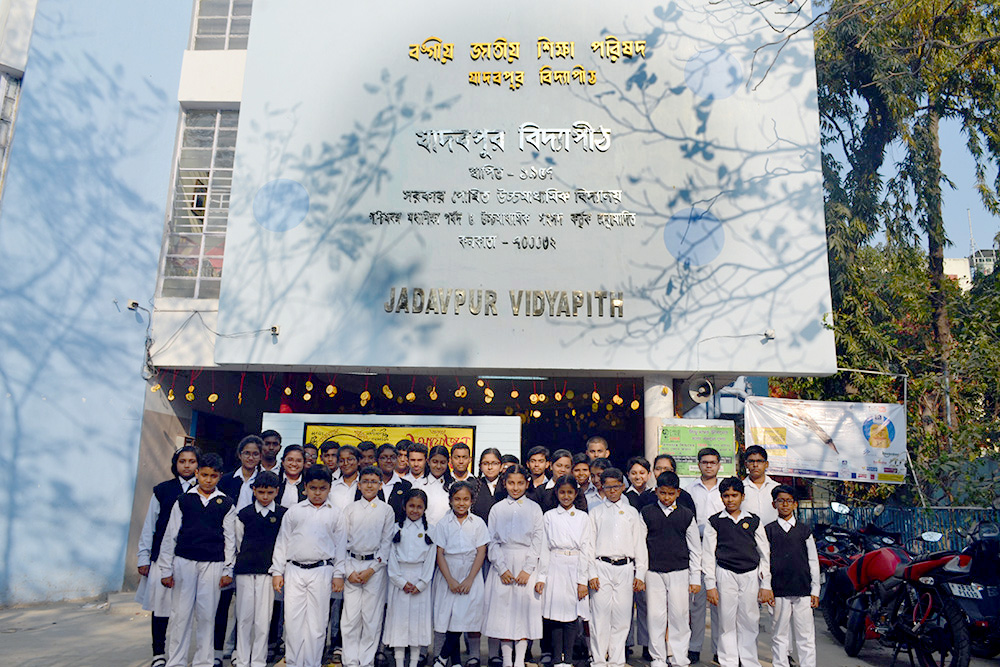
- Jadavpur Vidyapith entrance

Location
- 188, Raja Subbodh Chandra Mallick Rd. Kolkata, West Bengal 700032; India; 22°29′58.18″N 88°22′04.32″E

Information
- Type: Private body(Primary); Government aided school
- Motto: Enter to learn, Depart to serve
- Established: 11 March 1957
- Head teacher: Partha Pratim Baidya
- Faculty: 50+
- Grades: V-XII
- Gender: Co-educational
- Enrollment: ~ 1500
- Campus type: Urban
- Colors: White and sky blue for Primary; White for High School
- Board: WBBSE(Class V-X); WBCHSE(Class XI-XII)
- Website: jadavpurvidyapith.org

Jadavpur Vidyapith is an English & Bengali medium day school in the Jadavpur area of metropolitan Kolkata, India, established in 1957. Its campus borders that of Jadavpur University. The school building houses a teacher training institute belonging to Jadavpur University.

== Notable alumni ==
- Srijato, Poet & Lyricist.

== See also ==
- List of schools in Kolkata
- List of schools in West Bengal
