= Pravrajika Shraddhaprana =

Indian saint

- Born: Lakshmi; 19 October 1918; Patna, Bihar and Orissa Province, British India
- Died: 3 February 2009 (aged 90); Dakshineswar, Kolkata, India
- Occupation: Sanyasini
- Years active: 1941–2009
- Known for: Spiritual teachings

Pravrajika Shraddhaprana (19 October 1918 – 3 February 2009) was a Sannyasini in the Sri Sarada Math. She was the third president of Sri Sarada Math. The name Pravrajika means a "mendicant nun" or Sannyasini and the suffix prana to her name Shraddha followed means "one whose is devoted to" spirituality.

== Biography ==
Shraddhaprana was born in Patna on 19 October 1918 to parents Mathuranath Sinha and Sushila Sinha. Her maiden name was Lakshmi as she was born on Kojagari Lakshmi Puja. While her father had only seen Sri Ramakrishna but he had a meeting with Swami Vivekananda.

Shraddhaprana was initiated into spiritual life by Swami Virajananda in 1941 who was the sixth president of the Ramakrishna Math and Ramakrishna Mission. She started her career as a lecturer in the Annie Besant College, Varanasi prior to working in the Sister Nivedita Girls’ School in 1948 and she worked there until 1955 as the Assistant Headmistress Assistant Secretary. She became the head Mistress in the same school up to 1968 and then served as Secretary till 1986. Earlier she had taken the path of brahmacharya from Swami Shankarananda of the Ramakrishna Mission, along with six others in 1953. She was ordained as sannyasini by Swami Shankarananda in 1959 who was the then president of the Belur Math at the time; she was among the first batch of eight sannyasinis who had taken the oath.

When Sri Sarada Math became an independent spiritual centre in 1959 she was made a trustee, and in the year 1960 she assumed charge of the post of Assistant Secretary of the Math and the Ramakrishna Sarada Mission. In April 1986, she moved to Sri Sarada Math. She was General Secretary of Sri Sarada Math from 1994 to 1999. Following the death of Pravrajika Muktiprana the first Secretary of the math in 1994, she became the second General Secretary of the math which position she occupied till 17 November 1999.

Shraddhaprana became president of the Sri Sarada Math and Ramakrishna Sarada Mission on 17 November 1999 on the festive day of Jagaddhatri Puja, following the death of Pravrajika Mokshaprana, the second president. She died on 3 February 2009 At Dakshineswar, Kolkata. Following her death, Pravrajika Bhaktiprana assumed charge of the President of the math in April 2009.
