= Mitra Institution (Main) =

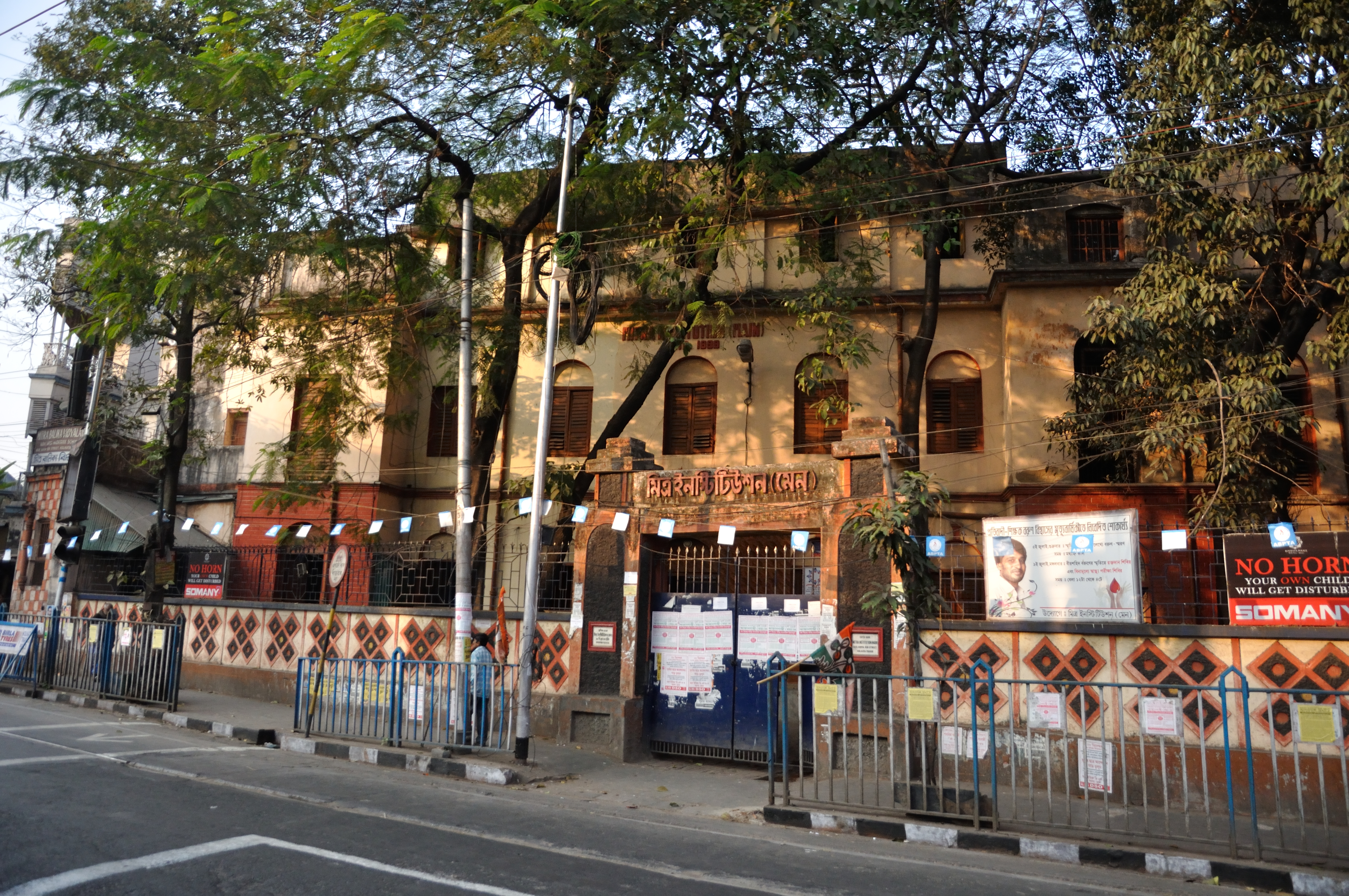

Location
- 60-B Surya Sen Street; Kolkata, West Bengal, 700 009; India

Information
- Type: Government
- Religious affiliation: Secular
- Established: 5 January 1898; 128 years ago
- Founder: Bisweswar Mitra
- School board: WBBSE & WBCHSE
- Authority: Government of West Bengal
- Category: Higher Secondary
- Chairman: Governor of West Bengal
- Principal: Sayantan Das (Head Master)
- Years offered: 120
- Gender: only boys upto X and HS section CO-ED
- Campus: Urban
- Affiliations: West Bengal Board of Secondary Education; West Bengal Council of Higher Secondary Education

Mitra Institution (Main) is a heritage educational institution of Kolkata, West Bengal, teaching grades one to twelve under the West Bengal Board of Secondary Education and the West Bengal Council of Higher Secondary Education. The school premises are situated at 60-B Surya Sen Street, near Sealdah. There is a different co-educational primary and a girls school section up to class X.

== History ==
The school was established by Babu Bisweswar Mitra on 5 January 1898. Initially it started with only five students. In 1901, Raja Peary Mohan Mukherjee became the first President of the school. After the recognition of University of Calcutta in 1904, the school became famous. Sir Ashutosh Mukherjee and Sir Alexander Pedlar, the then Vice Chancellor, helped the institution to grant affiliation of the university. Bipin Chandra Pal, Gopal Krishna Gokhale, Sir Bhupendra Nath Bose, Amritlal Bose visited Mitra Institution (Main) and became involved with its affairs. Renowned revolutionary teacher from Sutia, late Barun Biswas served here.

== Alumni ==
=== Others ===
Name	Year	Degree	Notability	References
Saumyendranath Tagore	1917	Matriculation	Political ideologue, essayist	
Bishnu Dey			Poet, essayist	
Nirendranath Chakravarty		Matriculation	Poet, translator, novelist	
Debi Prasad Pal		Matriculation	Advocate, Legislator, former Union Minister of State for Finance	

== See also ==
- List of schools in Kolkata
- List of schools in West Bengal
