= Hindu Vidyapith =

Location
- Ward No.:10, Bidhannagar Municipal Corporation Kolkata - 700059; Baguiati, Kolkata (Calcutta), West Bengal, India
- Coordinates: 22.616°N 88.426°E

Information
- Type: Government sponsored
- Established: 1938
- Founder: Radhikaprasanna Banerjee
- Faculty: 43
- Gender: Co-educational
- Enrollment: 1814
- Language: Bengali
- Colors: Blue Check Shirt and Blue Pant
- Affiliation: WBBSE and WBCHSE

Hindu Vidyapith, informally known as 'CCHV' and also known as 'Chittaranjan Colony Hindu Vidyapith') is a co-educational higher secondary school in Rajarhat, Kolkata, West Bengal, India.

== Admission ==
The school provides admissions to 14 courses in business, economics, politics, education, philosophy, history, science and languages.

== History ==
The school was established in 1938. Radhikaprossono Banerjee secured 11 katha of land gifted by Radhacharan Chatterjee. Bhupatimohon Sen, Brajeshwar Biswas and Jagdish Chatterjee also played key roles in the establishment of the school. It started as a private school but later was sponsored by the School Education Department, West Bengal Government.
