= Bengal National Chamber of Commerce & Industry =

Bengal National Chamber of Commerce & Industry, established on 2 February 1887, is one of the oldest association of business organizations based in Kolkata, West Bengal. It was organized originally during the days of the British Raj to promote trade, commerce, and industry by Indian entrepreneurs and its history is closely interwoven with India's struggle for independence

The founder members were mostly the elite Bengali zamindars and entrepreneurs, and later the Marwari, Gujarati entrepreneurs from Bengal also joined the association. The first president was Rai Buddree Das Mukkim Bahadur in 1887. Other notable members and presidents were, Raja Sew Bux Bagla, Maharaja Manindra Chandra Nandy of Cossimbazar Raj family, Nalini Ranjan Sarkar, Amritlal Ojha.

BNCCI organises Industrial India Trade Fair at Kolkata in association with India Trade Promotion Organisation.
