= Grace Ling Liang English School =

Grace Ling Liang English School (GLLES)
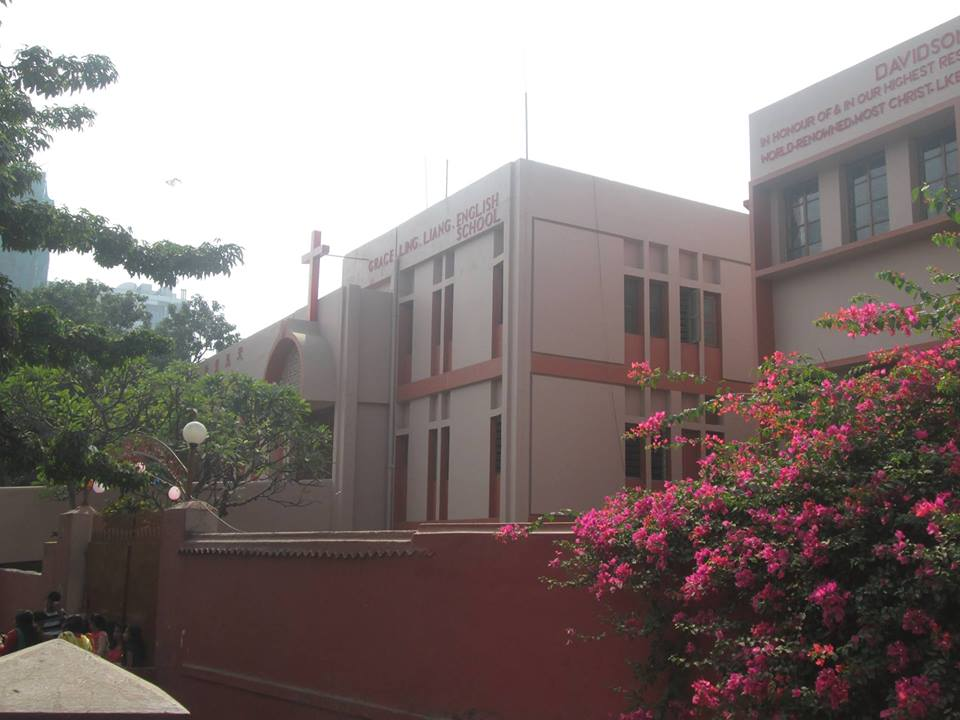

Location
- 21B, Hughes Road; Kolkata – 700046; India

Information
- School type: Coeducational, Private
- Motto: Deo Gratias (To God Be The Glory)
- Established: 1974; 52 years ago
- Founders: Rev. Dr. T.D.Lamb and Mrs. Mary Lamb
- Sister school: Ling Liang High School, Kolkata
- Session: April to March
- Chairman: Pastor Chiang Kuo Thai
- Principal: Miss Dorothy J. Matthews
- Classes: Preparatory to Class 12
- Language: English
- Hours in school day: 6
- Houses: Lambs; Davidson; Verma; Dzao
- Slogan: Deo Gratias
- Song: We are Proud to Belong Ourselves
- Sports: Basketball, Cricket, Football, Volleyball, Throwball
- Nickname: Gracians
- Yearbook: Light
- Communities served: LTS
- Affiliations: CISCE
- Website: www.gracelingliangenglishschool.com

Grace Ling Liang English School (informally GLLES) is a private, co-educational school imparting primary, secondary and higher secondary education, in Kolkata, West Bengal, India. The school is located at 21B, Hughes Road, Tangra, in the city of Kolkata and is open to children from all creeds and communities.

The school has a church. The school is equipped with a basketball court.

== History ==
The late Rev. Dr. and Mrs. T. David Lamb, a missionary couple that came to India from Shanghai, China in 1949, founded the Ling Liang Chinese Church Trust in 1961 and the Grace Ling Liang English School in January 1974. They brought with them a keen respect for literacy and did commendable piece of pioneering work in the field of education which finally resulted in the establishment of two educational institutions, one in central Kolkata and other in Tangra, an eastern suburb of Kolkata. Later, MC Alexander developed the school which was one building and a pond in the early days.

== Recognition ==
The Grace Ling Liang English School is recognized by the Department of Education, Government of West Bengal and is affiliated to the Council for the Indian School Certificate Examinations, New Delhi, which conducts the ICSE and ISC Examinations at the close of Classes X and XII respectively.

== School session ==
The school session is from April to March. Saturday is the normal weekly holiday (in addition to Sunday).

== Principals ==
- Late Dr. Ravi Verma
- Mr. Y. Victor Lalmohan Roy
- Dr. M.C. Alexander
- Mr Valentine Peter Roy
- Mr Terence John
- Ms. Dorothy Matthews

== See also ==
- List of schools in Kolkata
