= Mahatma Gandhi International School =

Mahatma Gandhi International School may refer to:

- Mahatma Gandhi International School, Pasay, Philippines

== See also ==
- Mahatma Gandhi School (disambiguation)
