= Pravrajika Bharatiprana =

Indian mission president

Pravrajika Bharatiprana (July 1894 Guptipara, British India– 30 January 1973 Sri Sarada Math, Dakshineswar, Kolkata ) was the first president of the Hindu religious organization Sri Sarada Math and Ramakrishna Sarada Mission, serving in that capacity from 1954 to 1973.

Named Parul by her parents, she was given the name Sarala when she left home. She was a disciple of Sarada Devi, and served her for many years. She received the vows of brahmacharya and sannyasa from Swami Shankarananda in 1953 and 1959. She died on 30 January 1973 at Sri Sarada Math, Kolkata.
