= The Calcutta Anglo Gujarati School =

Private high school in Kolkata, India

Coordinates: 22°34′29.32″N 88°21′00.28″E

The Calcutta Anglo Gujarati School (or CAG School) is a private high school in Kolkata, India. It has two school buildings, one for the boys and one for the girls. It is on Pollock Street in the Burrabazar area, the commercial hub of the city.

CAG School was founded in 1893 by the Gujarati-speaking business community of Kolkata, with an aim to provide education to their children in their mother tongue, Gujarati language. In later years Seth Tribhovandas Hirachand Kothari, who remained its secretary for 50 years from 1917 till his death. The school is patronized by the all Gujarati-speaking community, irrespective of their religion. Hindu, Jain, Kutchi and the Gujarati Muslims communities like Bohras, Memons and Khojas, contributed to its foundation and development.

Gujarati remains the first language in the school where, until 1985-86, all subjects were taught in Gujarati. Now English is the medium of instruction. The school is affiliated to the WB Board and students have to appear for Madhyamik examinations for passing out.

The same trust which runs the school has now started 'The Calcutta Anglo Gujarati College, which is affiliated to West Bengal University of Technology and offers courses in BBA and BCA.
