= Swami Prameyananda =

Personal life
- Born: Ramgopal Bhattacharya; April 1933 Sylhet, in present day Bangladesh
- Died: 20 October 2011 (aged 78) Kolkata, West Bengal, India

Religious life
- Religion: Hinduism

Religious career
- Teacher: Swami Shankarananda

Swami Prameyananda (April 1933 – 20 October 2011) was a vice-president of the Ramakrishna Order. He was born Ramgopal Bhattacharya in the village of Kani-shail in the Sylhet district of what is today Bangladesh, into an orthodox brahmin family. He joined the Ramakrishna Order in 1951 at its Karimganj center. In 1957, he received mantra and Brahmacharya diksha from Swami Shankarananda, receiving the name Premesha Chaitanya, and in 1961 he received Sannyasa and the name Swami Prameyananda from his guru. In 1966, he became secretary to Swami Vireshwarananda, the tenth president of the Order, and served him until the latter's death in 1985. Thereafter, he became the editor of the Bengali-language monthly Udbodhan from November 1985 to September 1987. In April 1987 he was made a trustee of the Ramakrishna Math, and in September came to Belur Math to become the manager. He held that post until he was made a vice president on 27 February 2009. During his tenure as vice president, he granted mantra diksha to 13,066 spiritual seekers.

On 19 October 2011, The Hindu reported that Prameyananda's condition was critical, as he had been admitted to the Ramakrishna Mission Seva Pratisthan on 9 October, and had been on life-support system since 17 October. He died at 8:25 am on 20 October. The Times of India reported that "People came from all over the country to bid adieu."

== Bibliography ==
- Swami Prameyananda (2011: Swami Atmasthananda, Belur Math) PDF version online
