= Gooroodas Banerjee =

Indian jurist and scholar (1844–1918)

Sir Gooroodas Banerjee
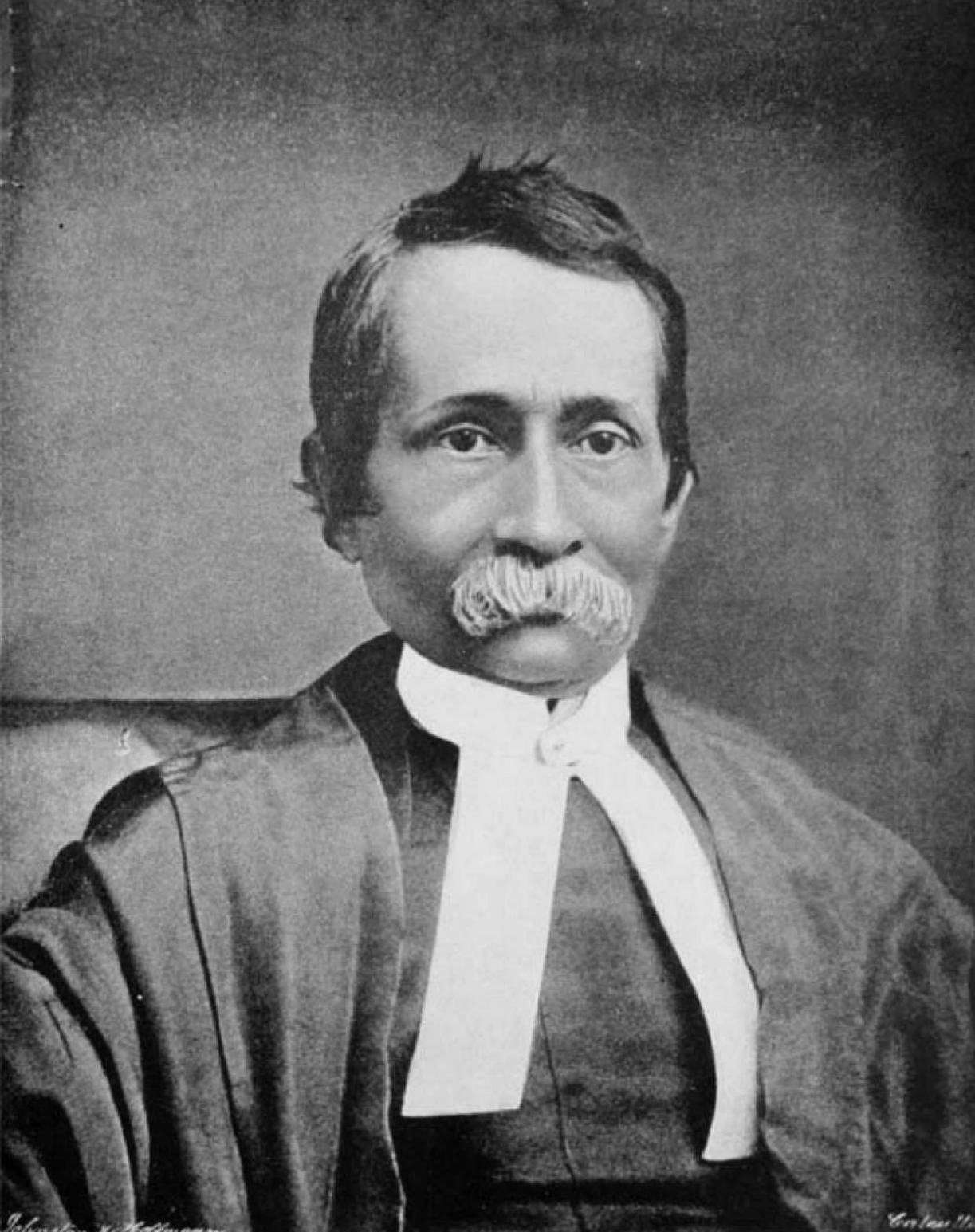
- Bust of Gooroodas Banerjee at the University of Calcutta
- Born: 26 January 1844; Calcutta, Bengal Presidency, British India
- Died: 2 December 1918 (aged 74); Calcutta, Bengal Presidency, British India
- Education: Oriental Seminary; Scottish Church College; University of Calcutta
- Occupations: Jurist, scholar, professor

Sir Gooroodas Banerjee (also Gurudas Bandyopadhyay, 26 January 1844 – 2 December 1918) was a judge of the Calcutta High Court in British India. In 1890, he also became the first Indian Vice-Chancellor of University of Calcutta.

== Education ==
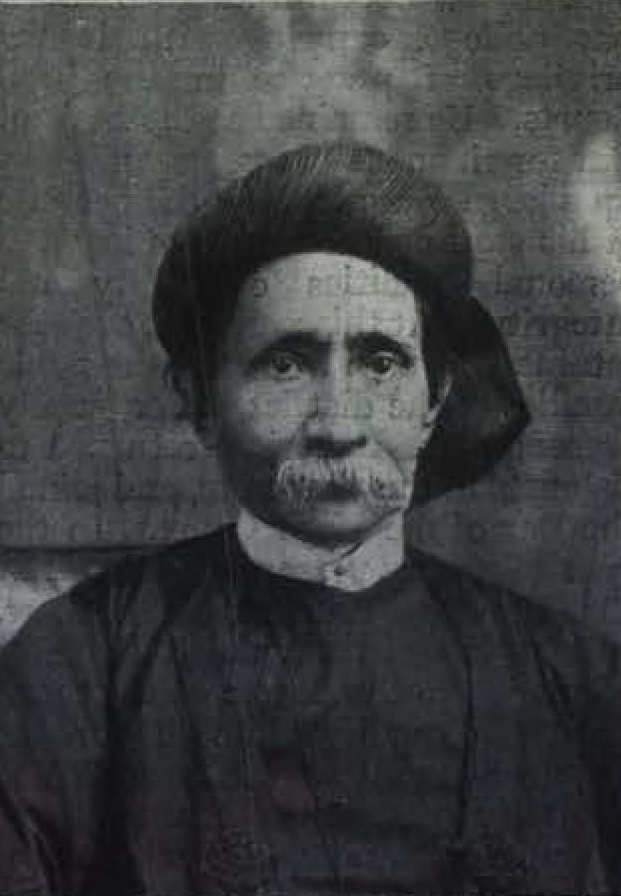

He received his early education at the Oriental Seminary, and the Hare School at the Presidency College Calcutta, the General Assembly's Institution (now Scottish Church College), the University of Calcutta. He obtained an M.A. with a focus on Mathematics in 1865, winning a University medal for attaining first place in his examinations, and passed the B.L. examination in 1866. in 1877, he obtained a Doctorate in Law.

== Career ==
Banerjee briefly taught as an Assistant Lecturer in Mathematics, before joining the General Assembly's Institution, now known as the Scottish Church College, as a Professor of Mathematics.

Banerjee began his legal practice in Berhampore, simultaneously teaching law and mathematics on a part-time basis at Berhmapore College. In 1872, he moved his legal practice to Kolkata, representing clients such as the erstwhile Nawab of Murshidabad at the Calcutta High Court. In 1878, he was appointed to the Tagore Professorship of Law, and delivered the Tagore Law Lectures in the same year, on 'The Hindu Laws of Marriage and Stridhan'. The Tagore Law Lectures were later published as a legal text on Hindu marriage laws.

In 1888, Banerjee was appointed as a judge of the Calcutta High Court, retiring in 1904 from the Bench. In addition to serving as a judge, he was the first Indian to be appointed as the vice-chancellor of the University of Calcutta, serving in that capacity from 1 January 1890 to 31 December 1892. He was knighted by the British government on 22 July 1904. He was also the President of the Board of Mathematics and Sanskrit during this time.

He also became one of the teachers of Bengal National College of which the great freedom fighter, Aurobindo Ghosh, was the principal. He made notable contributions to the spread of education by making sure that Narkeldanga High School got raised to secondary standard.

== Legacy ==
There is a prestigious post in the Department of English of the University of Calcutta named after Sir Gooroodas Banerjee. The professor who holds this post comes to be known as Sir Gooroodas Banerjee Professor. There are two undergraduate colleges in Kolkata that commemorate his name, the Gurudas College and the Sir Gurudas Mahavidyalaya. In memoirs of him, Sir Gurudas Banerjee Halt railway station was established in sub urban railway of Kolkata.

Banerjee was quite well known for his devotion to his mother who was very orthodox in her ways of life. Every day, he would bring the sacred Ganges water for her mother. She, on her deathbed, ordered her son Sir Gurudas to invite Iswar Chandra Vidyasagar to her obsequies. Vidyasagar had by this time become an object of attack by the orthodox Brahmins owing to his introduction of widow remarriage. Defying all social obstacles, Sir Gurudas invited Vidyasagar to his mother's funeral to fulfill her last wish.
