= Nalini Ranjan Sarkar =

Indian businessman, industrialist, economist and statesman (1882–1953)

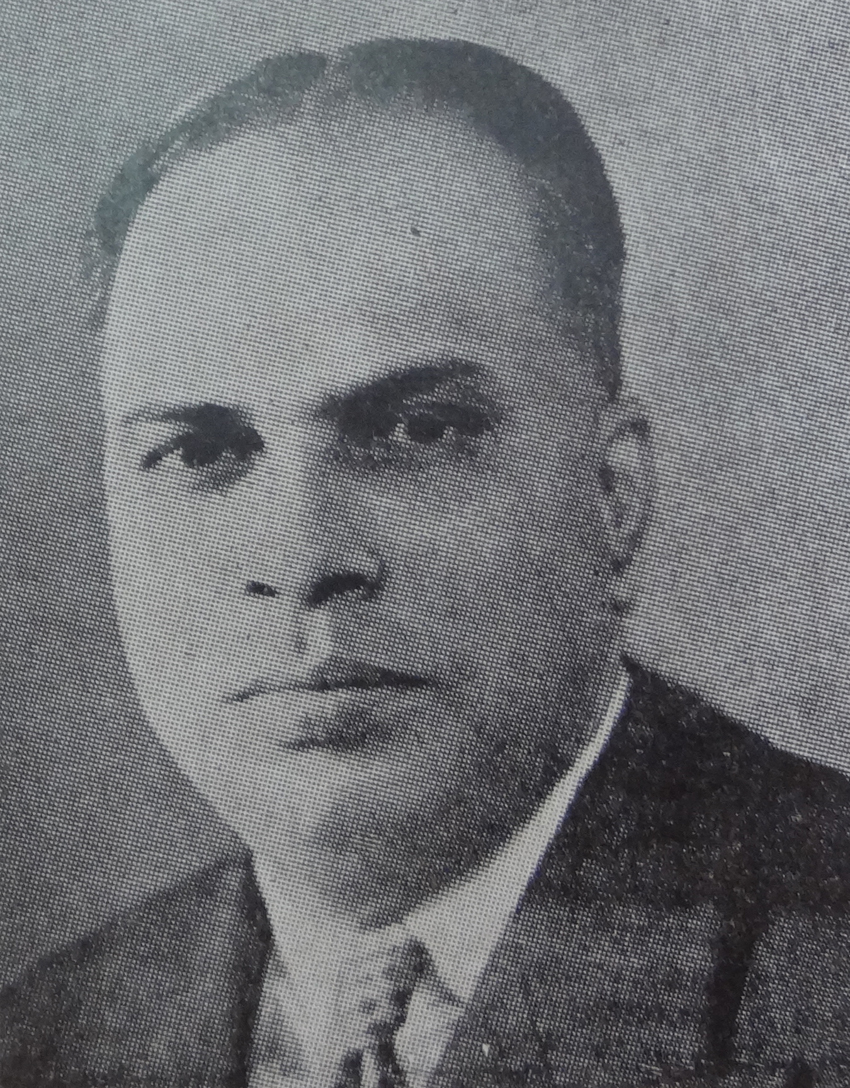
- Sarkar in 1935

Member of the Bengal Legislative Assembly
- In office 1937–1945
- Succeeded by: A. K. Ghosh and Bimal Kumar Ghosh
- Constituency: Mymensingh Urban (General)

Finance Minister of Bengal
- In office April 1937 – 1939

Personal details
- Born: 11 February 1882 Mymensingh, Bengal
- Died: 25 January 1953 (aged 70) Calcutta, West Bengal, India
- Party: Swaraj Party; Krishak Sramik Party; Indian National Congress

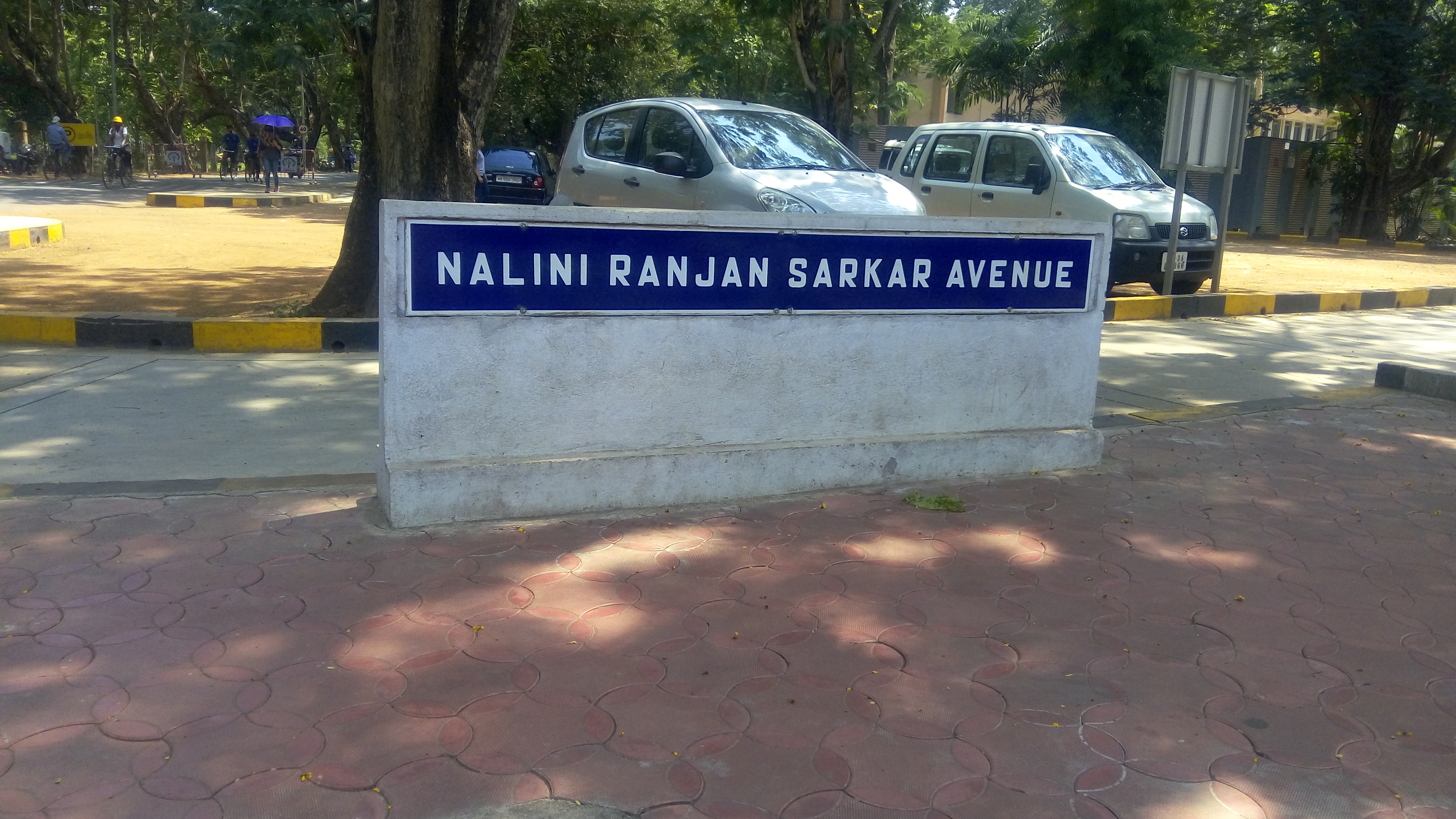
Nalini Ranjan Sarkar Avenue named after him at IIT Kharagpur

Nalini Ranjan Sarkar (11 February 1882 – 25 January 1953) was an Indian industrialist and statesman who was greatly involved in the economic regeneration of West Bengal. Sarkar was Finance Minister of West Bengal in 1948. The Sarkar Committee Report was instrumental in the subsequent establishment of the Indian Institutes of Technology (IITs) by the government of India.

== Early life ==
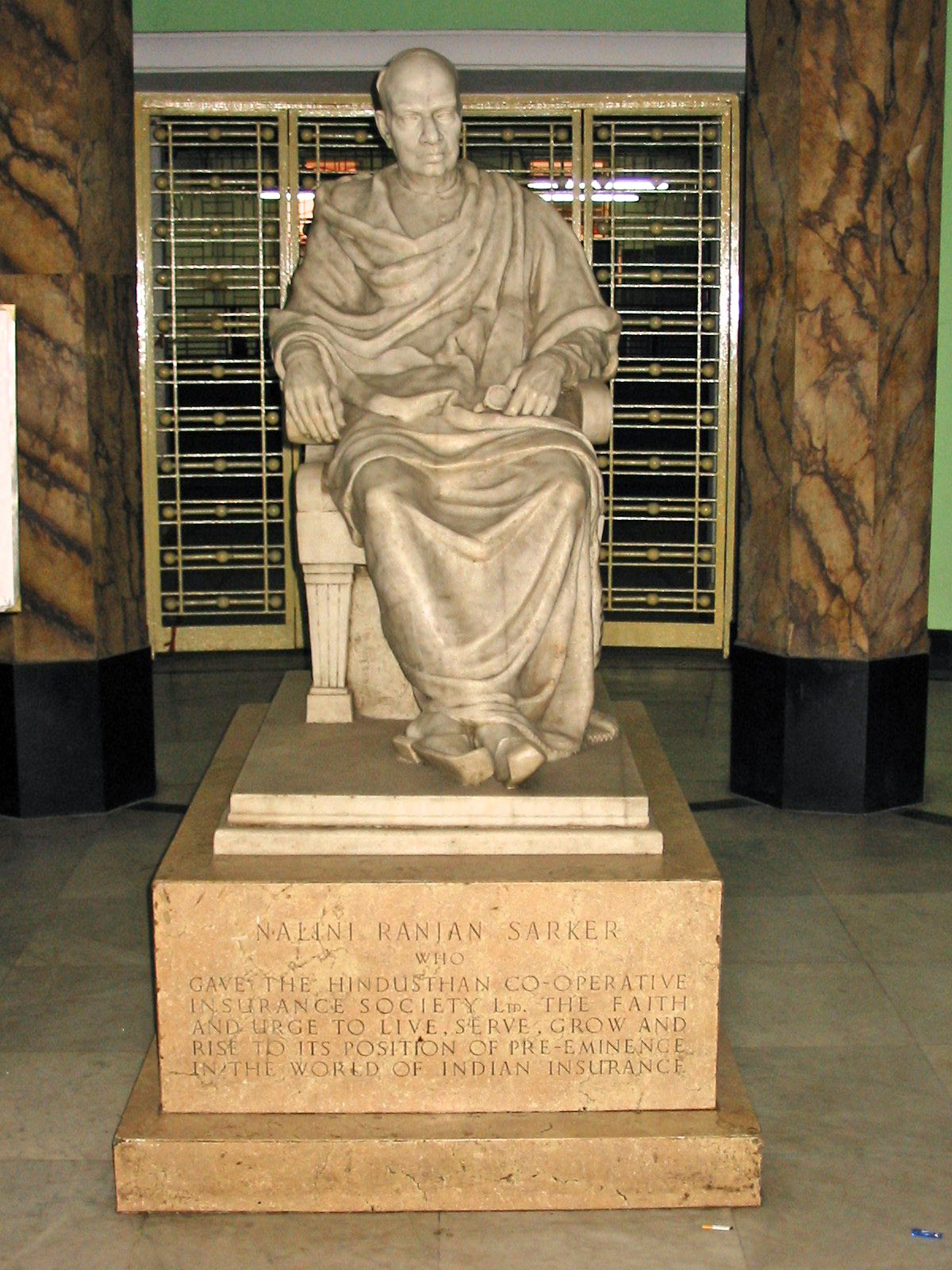

Nalini Ranjan Sarker was born in 1882 at Sajiura in the undivided Mymensingh district, Bengal, British India (now in Netrokona District, Bangladesh).

== Education ==
After passing the Entrance Examination from the Pogose School, Dhaka, in 1902, he joined the Jagannath College in Dhaka. Subsequently, he joined the Calcutta City College, of the University of Calcutta but could not continue his studies for financial reasons. He came to Kolkata penniless.

== Politics ==
He plunged into the nationalist movement that swept over the country in the wake of the Partition of Bengal in 1905. He enlisted himself as a Congress volunteer, lived in a dingy mess room huddled together with his friends. Often he had to pass days without food; for morning tea and snacks he would go to the houses of his friends and patrons. Courage and fortitude sustained him. He soon came to the notice of Deshbandhu Chittaranjan Das, who arranged for him a petty job in Hindustan Cooperative Insurance, of which poet Rabindranath Tagore was the founder chairman and Surendranath Tagore the chief executive.

== Career ==
Sarker had close contacts with Surendranath Banerjee, Tej Bahadur Sapru, Motilal Nehru, Mahatma Gandhi, Rabindranath Tagore, and Chittaranjan Das, all of whom developed his ideas of nationalism and economic freedom. He joined the movement against the partition of Bengal in 1905. In later years, influenced by Gandhi's ideas of non-violence, he participated in the Non-Cooperation Movement in 1920.

In the early 1920s, when C. R. Das and Motilal Nehru founded the Swarajya Party, he joined it and soon became one of its leaders. He was, at the same time, involved with the Bengal Provincial Congress Committee. He was also a member of the Bengal Legislative Council from 1923 to 1930 and again from 1937 to 1946, as well as chief whip of the parliamentary Swarajya Party in Bengal. In the Calcutta session of the Indian National Congress in 1928, he acted as the secretary of the exhibition organised for the occasion. He was one of the key figures of the Indian National Congress party in Bengal. He, Bidhan Chandra Roy, Nirmal Chandra Chunder, Sarat Chandra Bose, and Tulsi Chandra Goswami constituted what was known as the "Big Five" of the Bengal Congress. He was elected a councillor of the Calcutta Municipal Corporation in 1932 and became its mayor by 1934. His cousin Dhirendra Nath Sarker was also involved in his activities.

== Political career and ministerial roles (1935 to 1953) ==
In 1936, he organised the Krishak Praja Party with A. K. Fazlul Huq, and in 1937, he joined the first Huq ministry as the finance minister. In 1938, he resigned, but later joined the reconstituted ministry. In 1939, he resigned again, expressing his disappointment with the change in the outlook of the cabinet. He joined the Viceroy's Executive Council (1941–42), first as the member in charge of Education, Health and Lands and then as the person in charge of Commerce, Industry and Food. In 1943, he resigned, protesting the detention of Gandhi. He was Finance Minister of West Bengal in 1948 and retired from politics in 1952 after officiating as Chief Minister of West Bengal for a few months in 1949. Post the independence of India, Sarkar chaired a 3-man expert committee to draft the financial sections of the Indian constitution.

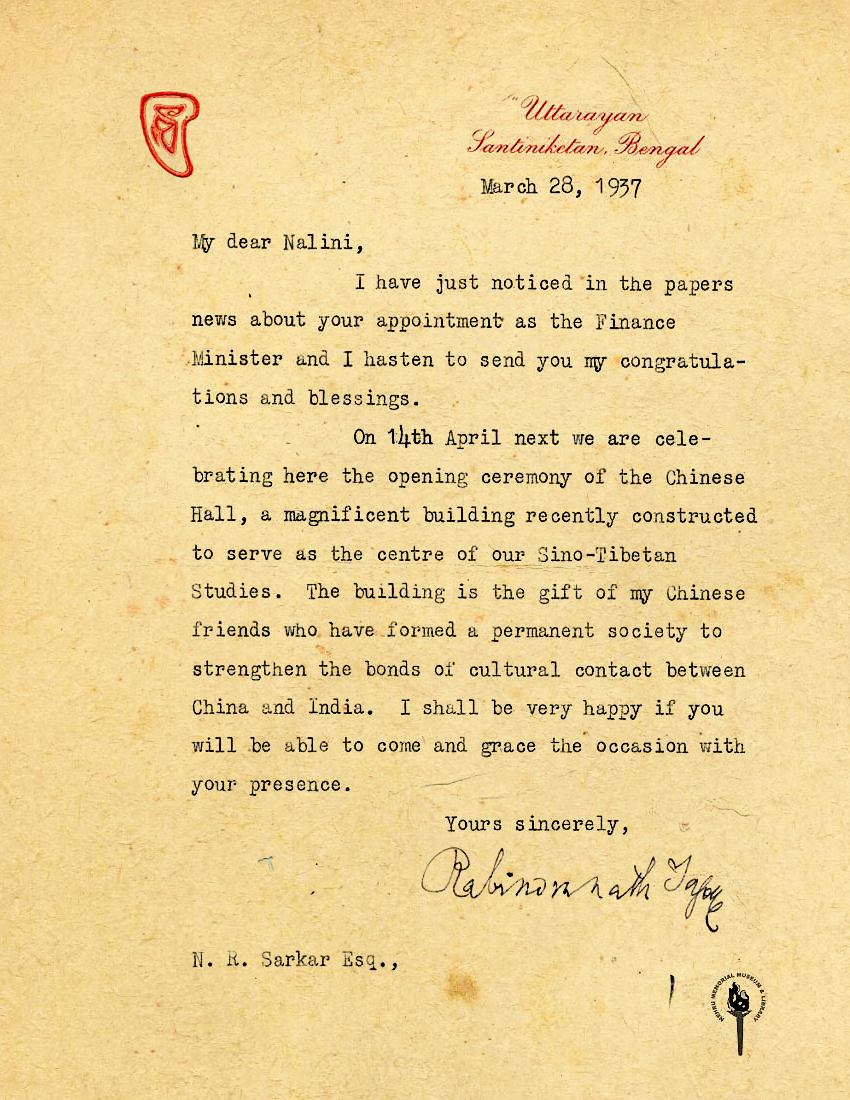

== Corporate career and public service ==
In 1911, he entered the Hindustan Cooperative Insurance Society (present-day Life Insurance Corporation of India; post-nationalisation of all private insurance companies in India in 1955), and from a humble position rose to control its majority ownership and the high position of general manager and ultimately president, a position he held till his death. At his instance, Hindustan Cooperative Insurance Society invested a large amount in acquiring a vast area of land in South-West of Kolkata for the purpose of setting up a modern satellite township for residential purposes. This area is today known as New Alipore.

He was also the president of both the Federation of Indian Chambers of Commerce & Industry (FICCI) in 1933 and the Bengal National Chamber of Commerce & Industry and a member of the Consultation Committee for revision of Company Law, Central Banking Enquiry Committee, Board of Income Tax Referees, Railway Retrenchment Committee, Separation Council and Board of Economic Enquiry, Research Utilisation Committee, and Central Jute Committee. He was a delegate to the Indo-Japanese Trade Conference in 1923. He was also a commissioner of the Calcutta port and a trustee of the Chittaranjan Seva Sadan.

He also acted as the vice-president of the National Council of Education, Bengal, and contributed to the spread of education in India. He was made a Fellow of the Calcutta University Senate in 1934, a Member of the Court of the University of Dacca in 1940–41, and the president of the Presidency College Governing Body in 1942. He was the pro-chancellor of Delhi University during the period 1941–42 as well as Banaras Hindu University. He also served as the chairman of the All India Council for Technical Education during 1946 – 1952. It was the Nalini Ranjan Sarkar committee that recommended the set up of IITs, along the lines of the Massachusetts Institute of Technology (MIT).

== Death ==
He died on 25 January 1953, aged 70, in Kolkata, of a heart attack.
