= Vidhyanjali High School =

Location
- 20/1, RamMohan Dutta Rd, Sreepally, Bhowanipore; Kolkata, West Bengal, 700020; India; 22.534184°N 88.3504493°E

Information
- Established: 1945
- Gender: Co-Ed
- Campus type: Urban
- Website: vidyanjalihigh.in

Vidhyanjali High School more commonly known by its old name Shree Bhawanipur Gujarati Balmandir is a high school located at 20/1, Ram Mohan Dutta Road in Bhowanipur locality of Kolkata.

== History ==
It was founded by the generous contributions from the Gujarati speaking migrant community living in Calcutta with a view to teach Gujarati language based curriculum to their children. Among the founders were Himchandbhai Shah, Saudamaniben & others. Jayantilal Manishankar Ojha was also one of the founder trustee of the school. The noted educationist and independence activist Shantaben Patel, who was a pioneer of the Montessori system of education in India was instrumental not only in founding of the school but also efficiently running the school for over 60 years. The school was a member of Association of Montessorians in India. She collaborated with Maria Montessori to laid the foundation of school on 22 March 1945. In later years city's prominent Gujarati businessman Kanubhai Bhalaria also served the school as one of the trustees.

In 1984, the medium of instruction was changed from Gujarati to English. In 2000, the school opened its doors to the children of other communities. In 2004, in its diamond jubilee year, Balmandir became a high school under the newly christened name ‘Vidyanjali High School'.

In 2005, Shantaben Patel was felicitated with Dr Mrs NB O'Brien Lifetime Achievement Award on 28 September, at The Telegraph School Awards for Excellence, held at Science City auditorium in Kolkata.

== Current status ==
Currently, the school is affiliated to West Bengal Council of Higher Secondary Education. It provides education up to 12th with streams in humanity, science & commerce.

=== Vidhyanjali International School ===
Further, it has tied up with Cambridge International Examinations, University of Cambridge, United Kingdom as a Cambridge International Centre and another unit & faculty runs in the same premises as Vidhyanjali International School.

== See also ==
- Education in India
- List of schools in India
- Education in West Bengal
