= National English School, Kolkata =

Information
- Established: 2000; 26 years ago
- Grades: Nursery - Class XII
- Gender: Mixed

National English School is a co-educational institution (Nursery - Class XII) located in Baguiati, Kolkata, India. It is affiliated with the Council for the Indian School Certificate Examinations. It was established in 2000 by philanthropist Sudhir Kumar Saha. In 2008, a campus at Rajarhat was established. In 2017, a B.Ed college called National College of Education was also established for training teachers with degrees in Bachelor of Education (B.Ed).

== Campuses ==
- VIP Road Campus (main campus)
- Deshbandhunagar Branch (est. 2008)
- Rajarhat Campus (est. 2008)
- National College of Education – Rajarhat (est. 2017)
