= The Newtown School =

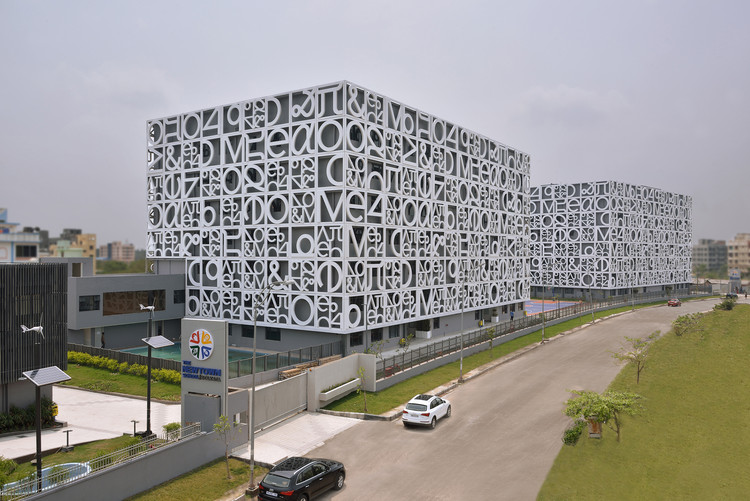
- View of The New Town School

Location
- Kolkata, West Bengal, 713409; India; 22.5709104°N 88.4687657°E

Information
- Motto: The future begins here
- Established: 2015
- Language: English
- Affiliation: CBSE
- Website: thenewtownschool.org

The Newtown School is a private English-medium co-ed school located in New Town, Kolkata, West Bengal, India. This school is affiliated to CBSE. This is the first Indian IGBC certified school. The school was established in 2015.

== Architecture ==
Keeping in mind the location of the school in the Newtown Area of Kolkata, and its simple surroundings, this school needed to make an impact and establish a distinct identity. The locality is planned in a radial grid and the site for the school is curved along the longer edges. Of the 2-acre plot, the school occupies approximately 1,60,000 sq ft. of floor space. Architect Abin Chaudhuri was asked to complete 'the Newtown School’ when construction was already underway. Graphical representations of symbols, alphabets and numbers became an inspiration for the screen. Younger children relate to simple lines as letters of the alphabet and as they grow, abstractions of the same would start to look more like alpha, gamma and pi. Thus, Familiar shapes and symbols were used to create a bespoke stencil screen around the existing unremarkable building mass. The facade not only provides shade to the classrooms from the harsh sun but also lends the school a distinct identity. 488 panels, made of Fibre-Reinforced Plastic (FRP), measuring 3.2 x 3.2 meters envelop each of the two academic blocks. 13 different panels were designed with a combination of small and large alphabets, numbers and symbols. These have been placed in various orientations to achieve a randomized effect on the façade.

== See also ==
- Education in India
- List of schools in India
- Education in West Bengal
