= Barasat Mahatma Gandhi Memorial High School =

Secondary school in West Bengal, India

- Barasat, North 24 Parganas; West Bengal; India

Information
- Former name: Barasat Government School
- Type: Secondary school
- Established: 26 February 1948; 78 years ago
- Founder: Late Binoy Bhushan Ganguly
- School board: WBBSE
- Headmaster: SK Ali Ahsan
- Gender: Boys
- Website: www.bmgmhighschool.org

Barasat Mahatma Gandhi Memorial High School is a higher secondary boys' school located at Nabapally in Barasat, Kolkata, North 24 Parganas, West Bengal, India.

== History ==
The school was established with 38 students on 26 February 1948, as Barasat Government School, just after the death of Mahatma Gandhi.

== Subjects ==
The curriculum is as per the West Bengal Board of Secondary Education (till class 10) and West Bengal Council of Higher Secondary Education (classes 11 and 12). The common curriculum is followed till class 10. In class 11 and 12, all three streams, science, commerce. and arts. are offered.
