= Saltlake Shiksha Niketan =

My School

Salt Lake Shiksha Niketan
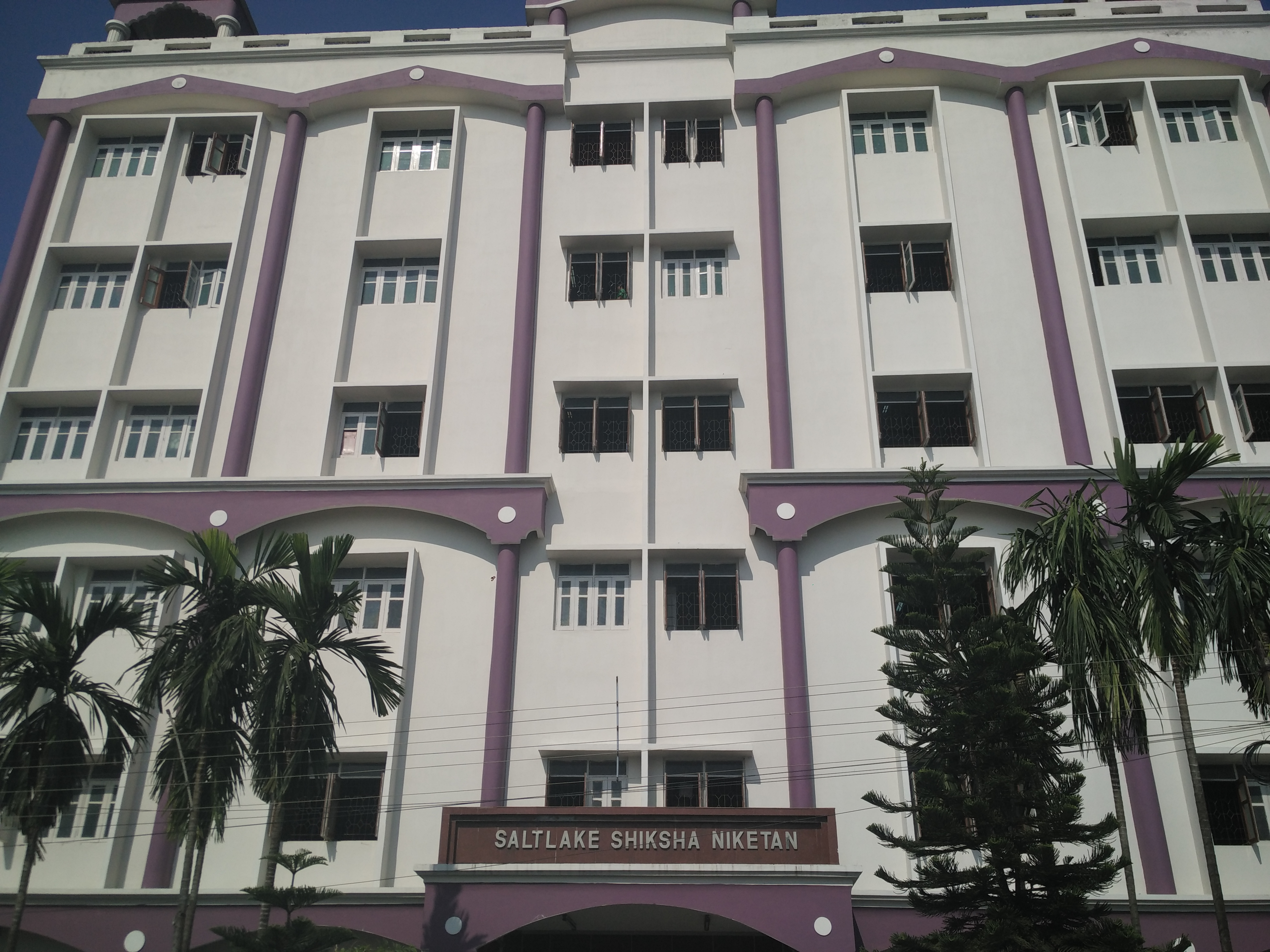

Location
- Mahisbathan, Kolkata, West Bengal, India; 22.5763818°N 88.4421716°E

Information
- Motto: तमसो मा ज्योतिर्गमय
- Established: 2005
- Dean: CA Manish Bharati Mahto
- Principal: Ms. Madhusmita Bezbaruah
- Headmistress: Prof. Palak Mehta
- Head of school: Abhiroop Bhattacharya
- Grades: Class LKG to XII
- Enrollment: ~ 3500
- Campus size: 82,000 sq.ft.
- Campus type: Urban
- Slogan: Only those who have witnessed enough hatred, can understand the depth of love.
- Affiliation: Central Board of Secondary Education (CBSE)
- Alumni: Agnim Dutta, Tiyas Mondal, Dr. Aryan Kumar
- Website: saltlakeshikshaniketan.org

Saltlake Shiksha Niketan is a private co-ed school located at Bidhannagar in Kolkata, West Bengal.

== About the school ==
Salt Lake Shiksha Niketan is a benevolent institution, formed by the members of linguistic minority viz. HARYANAVIS & MARWARIS within the meaning of Article30 of the Constitution of India and registered as a non-profit making society under Societies Registration Act. It is governed by a Board of trusties and democratically elected governing body. Its broad aim is the all round development of the society at large.

In particular, it seeks to promote the spread of education, natural regeneration and moral uplift of the young generation to remove social evils and to upgrade the living condition of the poor and downtrodden without taking into account the cast, creed and gender in West Bengal. The area has been selected, taking into mind the underdeveloped suburban part of Salt Lake City, which will be in the heart of the newly developing township at Rajarhat. The School will cater to the needs of Mahisbathan, Salt Lake, Lake Town, Bangur, Baguihati etc areas as well. The increasing population has created a serious and grave academic problem today. Some institutions are there but they are not sufficient in number.
