= Ramakrishna Sarada Mission Sister Nivedita Girls' School =

- Sister Nivedita Girls' School

Location
- 5, Nivedita Lane; Bagbazar; India; Kolkata, India, West Bengal, 700003
- Coordinates: 22.602737°N 88.366012°E

Information
- Type: Girls' school
- Motto: Atmano mokshartham jagat hitaya cha (For one’s own salvation and for the welfare of the world)
- Religious affiliation: Hinduism
- Established: 13 November 1898; 127 years ago
- Founder: Sister Nivedita
- Status: Active
- School board: WBBSE
- School district: Kolkata
- Authority: Ramakrishna Sarada Mission
- Grades: I–XII
- Gender: female
- Colours: Red and white
- Website: sisterniveditagirlsschool.org

Ramakrishna Sarada Mission Sister Nivedita Girls' School or Sister Nivedita Girls' School is a girls' school at Bagbazar, North Kolkata. It was established by Scottish-Irish social worker Sister Nivedita in November 1898.

== History ==
=== 1898–1917 ===
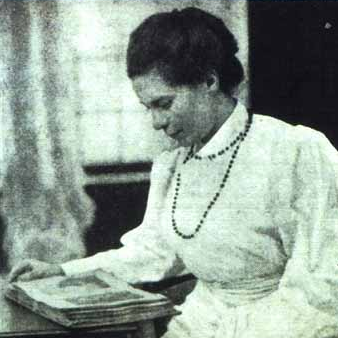
Sister Nivedita, founder of the school

At Swami Vivekananda's request Sister Nivedita went to India in January 1898.

On 13 November 1898, on the day of Kali Puja, at 16 Bosepara Lane in the Bagbazar area of North Calcutta, she started the school.

=== 1917–present ===
In 1902, it became a regular school.

In 1918 it became a branch centre of the Ramakrishna Mission. On 9 August 1963 it was transferred to Ramakrishna Sarada Mission, Dakshineswar as a branch centre of that organization.

== Infrastructure ==
=== Sections ===
There are four sections: primary, secondary, industrial and higher secondary.

Primary section

The primary section has classes I to IV. A special committee following the Special Rules of the Education Department manages this section.

Secondary section

The secondary section has classes V to X. It is affiliated to the West Bengal Board of Secondary Education. Its management body is constituted following that of the West Bengal education department.

Industrial section

This department was started in 1903 by Sister Nivedita and Sister Christine. At that time it was named Pura-Stree Vibhaga. Here, students are taught for free. Handicrafts like embroidery, tailoring, and toy-making are taught here. Students organise an exhibition of their work every year. This industrial section is affiliated to the Directorate of Cottage and Small Scale Industries, Government of West Bengal since 1949, and they receive grants from them.

Higher Secondary section

This department, affiliated to WBBSE was established in 2023. Science, commerce and humidities streams, in both bengali and english medium is available.
