= Narkeldanga High School =

School in Kolkata, India

Location
- 50, Kabi Sukanta Sarani, Narkeldanga Railway Colony; Kolkata, West Bengal, 700085; India; 22.5718104°N 88.3830524°E

Information
- Established: 1862

Narkeldanga High School, India, was established in 1862 by social worker Rakhal Chandra Ghosh, who started the school in his house. Later it was primarily owing to the efforts of Sir Gurudas Bandyopadhyay, the first Indian Vice-Chancellor of Calcutta University, that Narikeldanga High School became an institution of secondary standard.

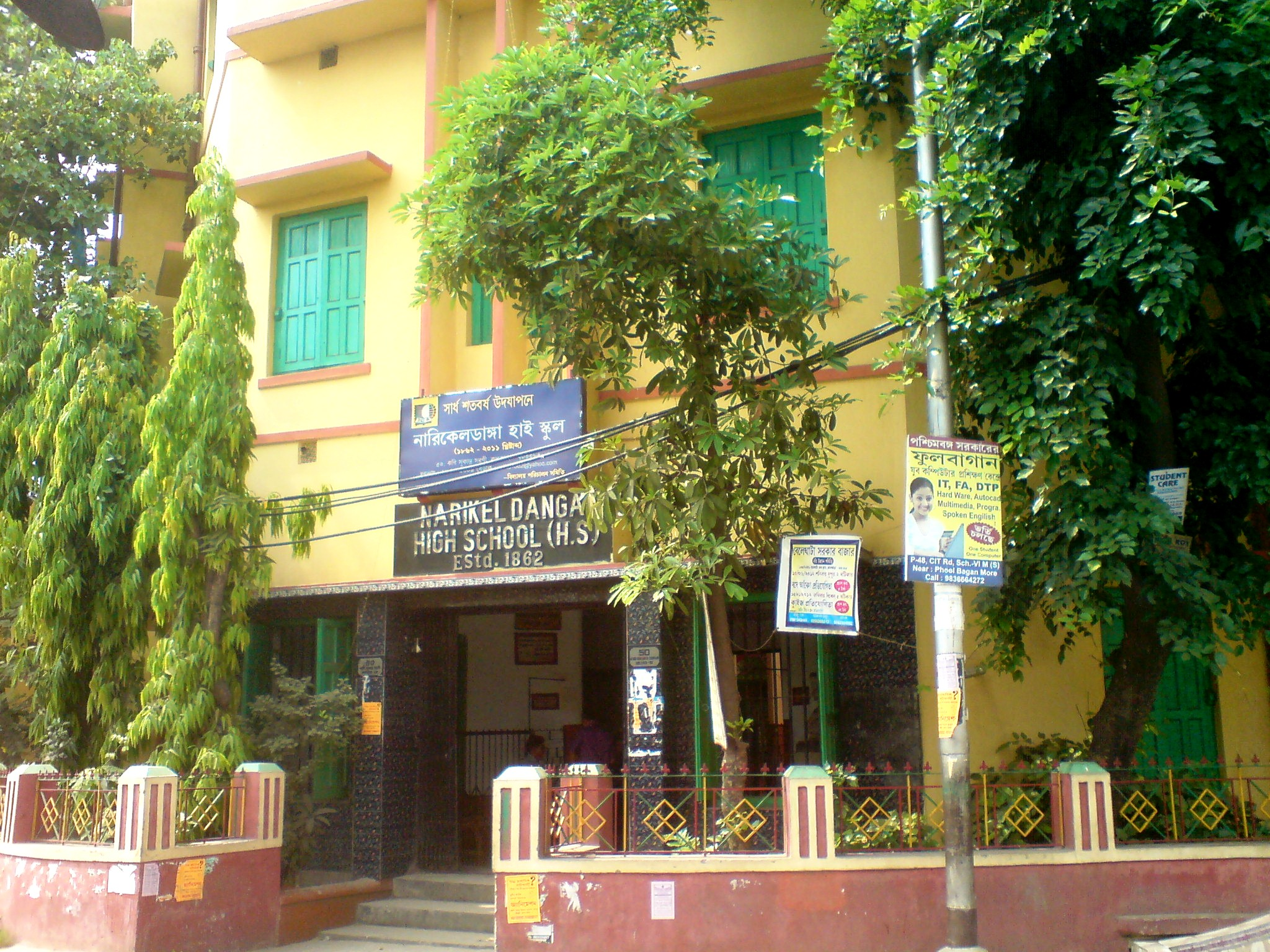

== Notable alumni ==
Jahor Roy, the famous comedian of Bengali cinema

Dr. Saroj Ghosh, recipient of the Padmabhushan Award, third in the Matriculation examination in 1950, has retired from being Director General of the National Council of Science Museum (Science City), was instrumental in development of a large chain of interactive science centres throughout India.

Prasanta Chatterjee, former mayor of Kolkata and Member of Parliament (Rajya Sabha)

== See also ==
- Education in India
- List of schools in India
- Education in West Bengal
- List of schools in West Bengal
- List of schools in Kolkata
