= Shankarananda (Ramakrishna monk) =

Swami Shankarananda
- স্বামী শঙ্করানন্দ

Personal life
- Born: Amritalal Sengupta অমৃতলাল সেনগুপ্ত; 9 March 1880 Baje Pratappur, Bengal Presidency, British India (now in Hooghly district, West Bengal, India)
- Died: 13 January 1962 (aged 81) Belur Math, West Bengal, India

Religious life
- Religion: Hinduism
- Order: Ramakrishna Mission

Senior posting
- Teacher: Swami Brahmananda
- Predecessor: Swami Virajananda
- Successor: Swami Vishuddhananda
- Disciples: Swami Smaranananda Swami Prameyananda Swami Vagishananda Swami Prabhananda Pravrajika Anandaprana Swami Bhaumananda and others

Swami Shankarananda (born Amritalal Sengupta; 9 March 1880 – 13 January 1962) was the seventh President of the Ramakrishna Math and Ramakrishna Mission. Join the Ramakrishna Math in 1902. As a student, he attended Swami Vivekananda's lectures and was drawn to the monastic life by Swami Sadananda, his maternal uncle and a disciple of Swami Vivekananda. Amulya was initiated by Swami Brahmananda in 1906. As a beloved disciple and also as a personal attendant of Swami Brahmananda for several years, he had the rare privilege of living with the Swami and of visiting many Math and Mission centres and various places of pilgrimage all over India.
