= Madhyamik Pariksha =

Secondary school exam in West Bengal

- Acronym: MP (SE)
- Type: Public examination Paper-based; Standardized t st
- Administrator: West Bengal Board of Secondary Education (WBBSE)
- Skills tested: Knowledge in languages, mathematics, sciences, social sciences
- Purpose: Certification of completion of secondary education
- Year started: 1857 (Matriculation Exam), 1964 (as Madhyamik)
- Duration: 10–14 days
- Score range: 0 to 700
- Score validity: Permanent
- Offered: Annually
- Restrictions on attempts: No
- Regions: West Bengal, Tripura
- Languages: Bengali, Santali, English, Hindi, Urdu (depending on medium of instruction)
- Annual number of test takers: 1,000,000+ annually (as of 2023)
- Prerequisites: Completion of 10th grade in a recognized school
- Fee: As prescribed by the WBBSE
- Website: WBBSE website

Madhyamik Pariksha or simply Madhyamik is a centralized examination conducted by the West Bengal Board of Secondary Education in West Bengal, India, at the end of the 10th year of school education. Similarly, one examination is also conducted at the state of Tripura for its students studying in Govt or Govt Aided school under the control of Tripura Board of Secondary Education. By count of examinees, it is among the better-known 10th standard examinations in India. In WBSE, over 600,000 students took the exam in 2000, and the number has increased substantially since then. The number of students reached a record 1 million in the 2011 Madhyamik examination. Compulsory subjects are first language, second language, physical science (combined with physics and chemistry), life science, mathematics, history and geography.

== History ==
From 1857 to 1964, the secondary examination was conducted by the University of Calcutta, under the name of matriculation examination. The Board of Secondary Education was established in 1951 under an Act of the State Legislature called the West Bengal Secondary Education Act of 1950. The board was subsequently renamed as West Bengal Board of Secondary Education in 1964, under the West Bengal Board of Secondary Education Act 1963. Since then, the examination has been renamed as the Madhyamik Pariksha (literally secondary examination in Bengali; the word madhyamik translates from the Bengali language as middle level). During the pandemic period of COVID-19, the exam (2021) was cancelled. For ensuring the pressure of studies, the exam syllabus was reduced by 25% for 2021 and 2022 batch of students.

== Exam structure ==
Earlier, the first language had two papers of 90 marks each, all others having one paper each of 90 marks except Second Language and Mathematics, which had one paper each of 100 points.

Presently, the marks division is as follows: 90 marks each for all the compulsory subjects in the written exam. In addition the school allocates 10 marks for internal evaluation and project work. One exception is when the examinee does not take the exam from any school, in which case there are 10 extra points in the written papers. As, decision of the board pass marks is 25%. And a student must pass in every subject.

There was also an optional additional subject that could be chosen from those offered by the school among a huge selection allowed by the Board. The most common choice was work education and physical education, pisciculture. Other popular choices included mechanics and mathematics (the almost universal choice of high-scoring students) and bookkeeping (common among middle range students). If a student wished to take a subject as additional, it could have been physics, chemistry, computer science, and others.

Though the subject was optional, very few students chose it. If the points obtained in the additional subject were more than 34, 34 points were deducted, and the rest were added to the grand total. For points equal or lesser than 34, no points were added to the grand total. Despite the presence of this subject, percentage totals were calculated in 800 and not 900 points, thus offering the chance to score more than 100%. As of late this method has been discontinued and students may take up an additional subject solely to gain knowledge. No points will be taken into account from this subject, a decision which has caused most to drop this subject. Recently additional subject does not offer to make change the results.

Efforts are on to calibrate the syllabus with the much easier and higher-scoring (but broader, including more topics but lacking in depth) national curriculum offered by the central boards, namely the Council for the Indian School Certificate Examinations and the Central Board of Secondary Education. There had been suggestions that the Madhyamik should be taken on the syllabus of class 10 only as introduced in the higher secondary. The students of the year 2011 gave the exam like before, on the syllabi of both Classes 9 and 10.

From 2012, the exam has been taken only on the syllabus of Class 10.

For Madhyamik 2007, the whole syllabus for all the subjects had been changed to lessen the load on the students. There had both been some additions and some trimming done to all the subjects.

While the majority of students passing Madhyamik usually go on to appear for the Higher Secondary Examination conducted by the West Bengal Council of Higher Secondary Education, students may also opt for the All India Senior School Certificate Examination, conducted by the CBSE, or the Indian School Certificate examination conducted by the CISCE.

== Subjects ==
- Bengali (first or second language)
- Urdu (first or second language)
- English (first or second language)
- Hindi (first or second language)
- Nepali (first or second language)
- Mathematics
- Life Science
- Physical Science
- History
- Geography

== See also ==
- Uccha Madhyamik Pariksha
- Higher Secondary Examination
- West Bengal Board of Secondary Education
- West Bengal Council of Higher Secondary Education
