= West Bengal Board of Secondary Education =

Government education examination organization

- পশ্চিমবঙ্গ মধ্য শিক্ষা পর্ষদ
- Abbreviation: WBBSE
- Formation: 26th October 2009
- Established: 1951; 75 years ago
- Type: Governmental organisation
- Headquarters: Nivedita Bhavan, Sector II, DJ-8, Salt Lake, Sector II, Kolkata - 700 091; Derozio Bhavan, 77/2, Park Street, Kolkata - 700 016
- President: Prof. (Dr) Lalu Das
- Secretary: Niladri Shekhar Singha
- Website: wbbse.wb.gov.in

The West Bengal Board of Secondary Education (WBBSE) is the West Bengal state government administered autonomous examining authority for the Standard 10 examination (or secondary school level examination) of West Bengal, India. It came into force by the West Bengal Board of Secondary Education Act-1963. They conduct board exams every year. This exam is organized every February. The next exam will be held in 2027.

== See also ==
- West Bengal Board of Madrasah Education
- West Bengal Board of Primary Education
- West Bengal Council of Higher Secondary Education
- School Education Department, West Bengal
