= List of schools in West Bengal =

School lists in West Bengal

This is a list of schools in the Indian state of West Bengal.

== Asansol ==
- Asansol Ramakrishna Mission High School
- Loreto Convent
- St. Patrick's Higher Secondary School
- St. Vincent's High and Technical School

== Alipurduar ==
- McWilliam Higher Secondary School
- Stepping Stone Model School

== Chandannagar ==
- Kanailal Vidyamandir
- Krishna Bhabini Nari Siksha Mandir
- St. Joseph's Convent

== Cooch Behar ==
- Jenkins School
- Nripendra Narayan Memorial High School
- Sunity Academy

== Darjeeling ==
- Chittaranjan High School
- Dr. Graham's Homes, Kalimpong
- Goethals Memorial School, Kurseong
- Kalimpong Girls' High School, Kalimpong
- Loreto Convent
- Maharani Girls' High School
- Mount Hermon School
- Rockvale Academy
- St. Joseph's School
- St. Paul's School
- Victoria Boys' School, Kurseong

== Howrah ==
- Don Bosco School, Liluah
- Kolorah High School
- Ramakrishna Mission Shilpayatana
- Santragachi Kedarnath Institution
- Sibpur S.S.P.S Vidyalaya
- St. Thomas' Church School
- Sunrise English Medium School
- Vivekananda Institution

== Hugli-Chuchura ==
- Chinsurah Deshbandhu Memorial High School
- Hooghly Branch Government School
- Hooghly Collegiate School
- Hooghly Gour Hari Harijan Vidya Mandir
- Hooghly Madrasah

== Itahar ==
- Itahar High School

== Jaynagar Majilpur ==
- Jaynagar Institution
- Majilpur Shyamsundar Balika Vidyalaya
- Sri Ramkrishna Ashrama

== Krishnanagar ==
- C.M.S. St. John's High School
- Krishnagar Collegiate School
- Krishnanagar A.V. High School
- Krishnanagar Academy

== Malda ==
- Barlow Girls' High School
- Malda Zilla School
- Ramakrishna Mission Vivekananda Vidyamandir

== Midnapore ==
- Midnapore Collegiate School
- Midnapore Town School
- Mission Girls' High School
- Vidyasagar Vidyapith

== Purulia ==
- Purulia Zilla School
- Sainik School

== Serampore ==
- Mahesh High School
- Mahesh Sri Ramkrishna Ashram Vidyalaya

== Tamluk ==
- Tamluk Hamilton High School
- Tamluk High School

== Udaynarayanpur ==
- Al-Ameen Mission
- Khila Gopimohan Siksha Sadan

== Other locations ==
- Aditya Academy, Kadambagachi
- Army Public School, Binnaguri
- Bagnan High School, Bagnan
- Balurghat High School, Balurghat
- Bankura Zilla School, Bankura
- Basirhat High School, Basirhat
- Bishnupur High School, Bishnupur
- Bongaon High School, Bongaon
- Caesar School, Malbazar
- Chandrakona Jirat High School, Chandrakona
- Chhota Jagulia High School, Chhota Jagulia
- Contai High School, Contai
- Dankuni Siddiquia senior Madrasa, Dankuni
- Furfura Fatehia Senior Madrasah, Furfura Sharif
- Garh Raipur High School (Higher Secondary), Raipur
- Ghatal Vidyasagar High School, Ghatal
- Hat Chapra King Edward High School, Bangaljhi
- Islampur High School, Islampur
- Jalpaiguri Zilla School, Jalpaiguri
- Kalna Maharaja's High School, Kalna
- Krishnagar Collegiate School, Krishnanagar
- Krishnath College School, Berhampore
- The Levelfield School, Husnabad
- Nabadwip Bakultala High School, Nabadwip
- Nabagram Vidyapith, Konnagar
- Pal Choudhury High School, Ranaghat
- Palashipara Mahatma Gandhi Smriti Vidyapith, Palashipara
- Pannalal Institution, Kalyani
- Panskura Bradley Birt High School, Panskura
- Patha Bhavana, Santiniketan
- Raiganj Coronation High School, Raiganj
- Ramakrishna Mission Siksha Mandir, Sarisha
- Rolf Schoembs Vidyashram, Ghoksadanga
- Sainik School, Purulia, Purulia
- Sargachi Ramakrishna Mission High School, Sargachi
- Searsole Raj High School, Raniganj
- Siksha Satra, Sriniketan
- St. Xavier's School, Durgapur
- Uttarpara Govt. High School, Uttarpara
