= Dass Bank =

Defunct bank of India

Dass Bank (Bengali: দাশ ব্যাঙ্ক) was a commercial bank founded by Alamohan Das in 1939 in Calcutta that grew to have 60 branches all over Bengal. After the Partition of India, Dass Bank had to close because it had lost the majority of its branches when East Bengal became Pakistan.
