= Heritage Academy High school =

Heritage Academy High School
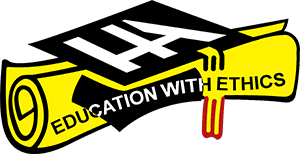

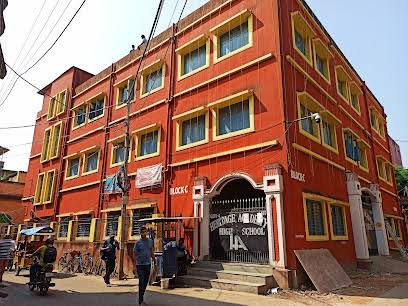
- Heritage Academy High School campus building

Location
- 69, Gopal Banerjee Lane, Ramkrishnapur; Howrah, West Bengal, 711101; India

Information
- Type: Private, Co-educational Day School
- Motto: To impart quality education to develop the heart and soul of the students through character building.
- Established: 2002; 24 years ago
- Administrator: Sourya Sadhan Bose
- Headmaster: Ayan Mukherjee
- Grades: Play House to Class XII
- Gender: Co-educational
- Affiliation: West Bengal Board of Secondary Education (WBBSE); West Bengal Council of Higher Secondary Education (WBCHSE)
- Website: hahs.in

Heritage Academy High School is a co-educational private English-medium school located in Ramkrishnapur, Howrah, West Bengal, India. Established in 2002, the school offers education from Play House through Class XII.

== History ==
Heritage Academy High School was founded in 2002 by a group of educationists and patrons with the goal of providing quality education and fostering leadership among students in Howrah. The institution aims to blend traditional ethics and cultural values with a modern, dynamic syllabus.

== Academics ==
The school serves students from pre-primary levels up to the higher secondary level. It is affiliated with the West Bengal Board of Secondary Education (WBBSE) for the Class X board examinations, and the West Bengal Council of Higher Secondary Education (WBCHSE) for the Class XII board examinations.

At the higher secondary level (Classes XI and XII), the school offers streams in Science (PCM and PCB) and Commerce. English is the primary medium of instruction, while Bengali is also offered as a language subject.

== Campus and Infrastructure ==
Located at 69, Gopal Banerjee Lane in Ramkrishnapur, Howrah, the campus is equipped with various facilities to support student learning and development. The school maintains science laboratories, classrooms, and provisions for indoor games.

== Extracurricular Activities ==
The school encourages a variety of extracurricular activities and events. Regular activities include indoor sports, martial arts, recitation competitions, and hobby classes. Heritage Academy High School also hosts events such as the Annual Day, investiture ceremonies, and student excursions.
