= 2018 Bengali teacher recruitment movement =

Darivit School Movement
- Date: 20 September 2018 – October 2018
- Location: Darivit High School, Islampur, North Dinajpur, West Bengal, India
- Caused by: Appointment of Urdu and teacher instead of a Bengali teacher despite no Urdu-medium students
- Goals: Appointment of a Bengali language teacher
- Methods: Human chain; Protests; Highway blockade; Student agitation; Civil resistance
- Status: Concluded
- Result: Police resorted to baton charge and firing; Urdu teacher detained, headmaster summoned, ongoing demands for CBI investigation

Parties
Bengali students; Former students; Local youth; Guardians	Police; chool administration	Student organizations

Lead figures
	Abhijit Kundu (Headmaster)

Casualties and losses
2 killed (Rajesh Sarkar, Tapas Barman); 12 injured (including Biplab Sarkar)		Unknown arrests

Police action
- Deaths: 2
- Injuries: 12
- Arrested: Unknown number; Mohammad Sanaullah (Urdu teacher) detained
- Detained: 1
- Post-movement developments: Protest march in Kolkata; 12-hour general strike; Demand for CBI investigation; Second post-mortem demanded
- Families of the deceased demanded a second post-mortem and temporarily buried the bodies by the Galancha River

In September 2018, a movement began at Darivit School in Islampur, North Dinajpur, West Bengal, demanding the appointment of a Bengali language teacher. The students began their agitation in protest of the appointment of Urdu-language teachers instead of Bengali teachers, despite the absence of a Bengali teacher. In opposition to such injustice against the Bengali nation, students of the school who cherished their mother tongue—both current and former—along with other youth of the village and groups of guardians, jointly participated in the movement. On 20 September 2018, the police resorted to baton charge and opened fire on the protestors. As a result, movement participants Rajesh Sarkar and Tapas Barman were killed. Additionally, a tenth-grade student, Biplab Sarkar, was shot and wounded—he was hit in the leg. The day is celebrated by many organisations as Bengali language day of West Bengal. There are demands from various organizations to recognise officially this day as "Bengali Language Day" in memory of the Darivit Bengali language martyrs.

== Inception ==
Despite the necessity for a teacher in the subject of Bengali at Daribhit High School in the Islampur Block, an Urdu teacher was appointed instead of a Bengali teacher. Thereafter, the students erupted in outrage. They initiated a movement in protest of the appointment of an Urdu teacher, even though there was not a single Urdu-medium student in the school.

== Movement ==
In protest against the appointment of the Urdu teacher and in demand for a Bengali teacher, the students began demonstrating by blockading the state highway adjacent to the school. Although the acting headmaster of the school initially assured them that the Urdu teacher would not be brought to the school, when the Urdu teachers attempted to assume duty, the students remained adamant in their demand and did not allow the Urdu teachers to join the institution. Later, when the police arrived, the educational institution turned into a battlefield over this issue. In protest of this incident, the civil society of West Bengal held a protest march in Kolkata. Additionally, a 12-hour general strike was called in protest.

== Post-movement developments ==
- The controversial Urdu teacher, Mohammad Sanaullah, was detained for interrogation. While attempting to join duty at Daribhit High School, he was twice confronted by agitating students’ demonstrations.
- The Board of Education summoned the headmaster of Daribhit High School, Abhijit Kundu, for negligence in the matter of teacher appointment.
- The families of the deceased, demanding a second post-mortem examination, did not cremate the bodies of Rajesh and Tapas, but instead buried them temporarily by the nearby Galancha River. They have demanded a CBI investigation.

== See also ==
- Bengali language movement (East Pakistan)
- Bengali language movement (Manbhum)
- Bengali language movement (Barak Valley)
