= Krishna Bhabini Nari Siksha Mandir =

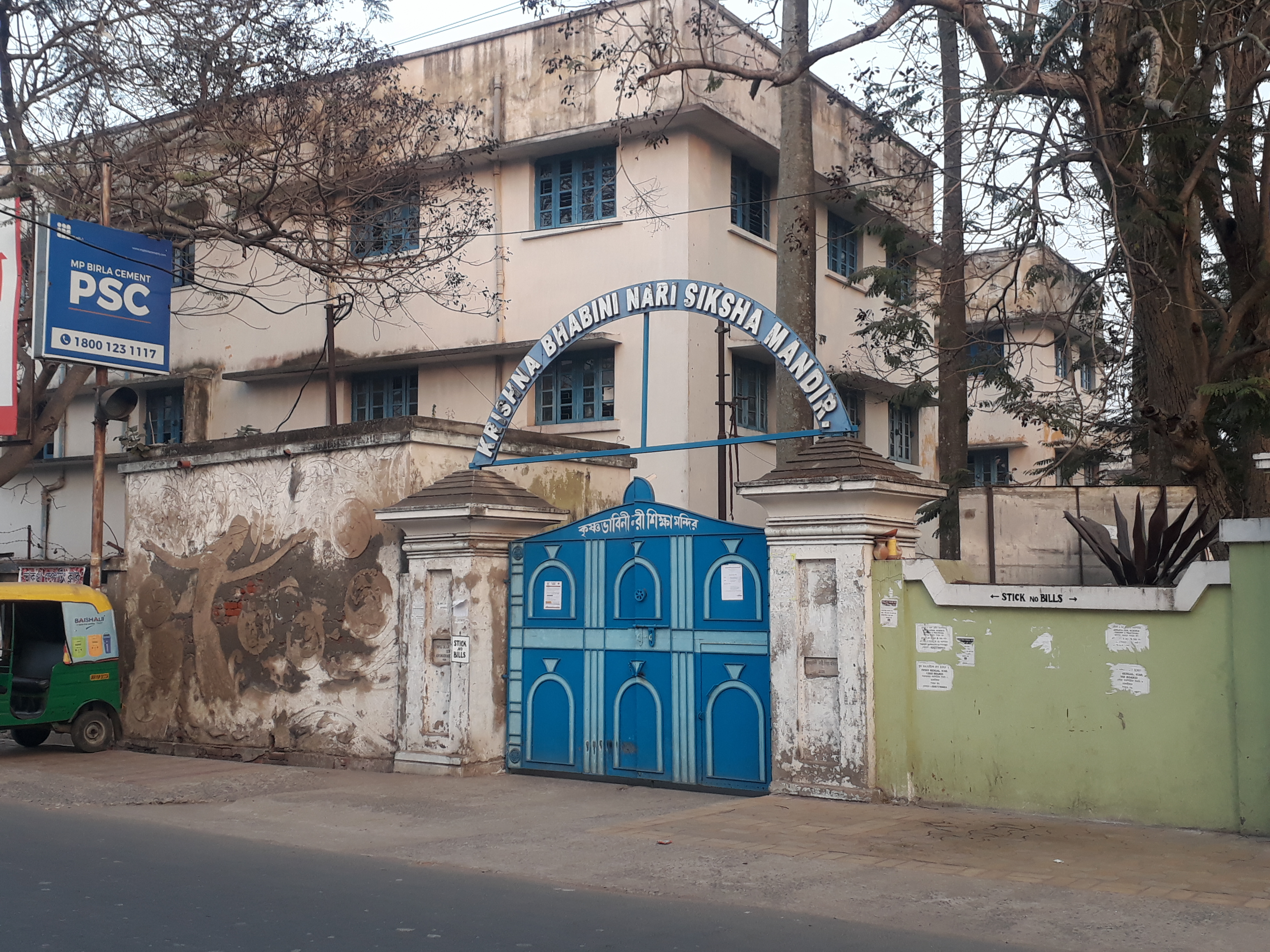
- Gate of Krishna Bhabini Nari Siksha Mandir

Location
- Urdi Bazar, Chandannagar, West Bengal, 712136; India; 22.8659574°N 88.3687629°E

Information
- Established: 1926
- Campus type: Urban

Krishna Bhabini Nari Siksha Mandir is a girls school in Chandannagar, West Bengal, India. It was established in 1926 by Harihar Sett in the name of his mother Krishnabhabini Das. In Hooghly district at Chandannagar area this was the first girl's high school. It is affiliated to WBBSE, WBCHSE. There was an arrangement hostel facility for students. It was one of the oldest educational institution in the area.

== See also ==
- Education in India
- List of schools in India
- Education in West Bengal
