= Council of Higher Secondary Education =

Council of Higher Secondary Education may also refer to:

Indian/State Government Boards of CHSE

- Council of Higher Secondary Education, Odisha
- West Bengal Council of Higher Secondary Education
