= Sibpur S.S.P.S Vidyalaya =

Sibpur Srimat Swami Projnanananda Saraswati Vidyalaya
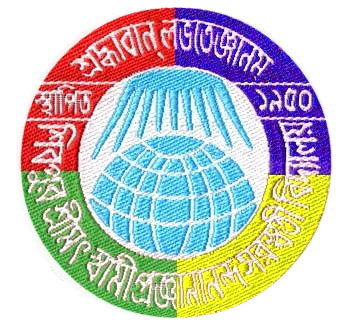
- Sibpur

Location
- 78/8 College Road; 711103; India; 22.559358°N 88.310359°E

Information
- Type: Higher Secondary school
- Established: 1 January 1950
- Founder: Shri Yogesh Chandra Mukhopadhyay
- School code: F1-134, 106078
- Grades: V to XII
- Gender: Boys
- Language: Bengali
- Houses: Red, Blue, Green, Yellow
- Colors: White; Black; Navy blue
- Affiliation: WBBSE & WBCHSE
- Website: www.facebook.com/projnanananda

Sibpur Srimat Swami Prajnanananda Saraswati Vidyalaya known as Sibpur S.S.P.S Vidyalaya is a Bengali-medium, Government-sponsored, higher secondary school located in Howrah, affiliated under the WBBSE and the WBCHSE.

The school was named after famous Indian nationalist and monk Swami Prajnanananda Saraswati and was established in the year of 1950 by Shri Yogesh Chandra Mukhopadhyay, one of the disciples of Prajnanananda Saraswati. The school is situated in 78/8 College Road, Howrah near the landmark Acharya Jagadish Chandra Bose Indian Botanic Garden.

== History ==
This institution was established in early post-independence era. In the year 1953 the school switched from its initial address at Haru Mistri lane, Howrah to its present address. The present school building was built in 1952. Shri Yogesh Chandra Mukhopadhyay (Bengali: শ্রী যোগেশচন্দ্র মুখোপাধ্যায়), the founder of the school also known as Dadu by the then students, contributed his personal land for the school building purpose. He was elected the first Secretary of the Managing Committee of the school. In 1954, the school was officially acknowledged by the Government.

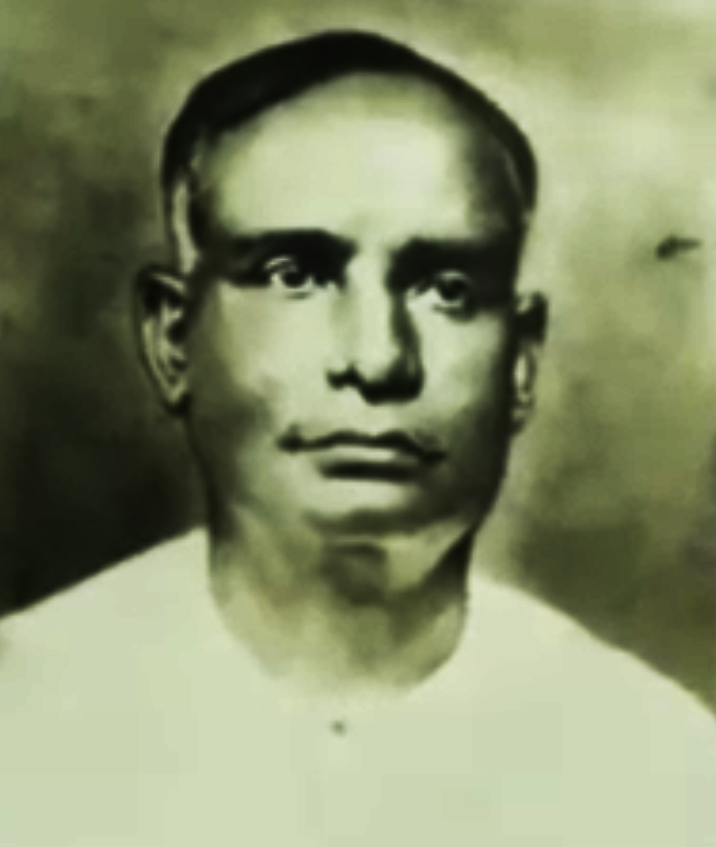
Jogesh Chandra Mukherjee, Discple of Swami Prajnanananda.

In the beginning days, the institution provided education up to grade VI, which was extended up to grade X in 1955; the school introduced herself as a Secondary School. Higher Secondary section to 11th standard was included later in 1962 and in 1977 this institution received permission for conducting Higher Secondary Examination following a 10+2 curriculum. The school's first Higher Secondary Examination held in 1979.

== Campus ==
There is a rectangular playground at the centre of the school. North and west side of the playground is adjacent to two three-storied buildings lying perpendicular to each other. One is the main building, constructed in 1952 and the other building was built in the 1990s. At the south end of the ground there is a school auditorium named ‘Surendra Mancha’, which was built in 1981. There is also a primary section of this school named Bharadwaj Shikshasram (Bengali: ভরদ্বাজ শিক্ষাশ্রম).

== Students ==
Sibpur S.S.P.S. Vidyalaya has around 1000 students in attendance. Each class is separated between two or three sections i.e. A, B and C and each of which contain around average 50 students. Class XI and XII are divided into three 'streams' known as Science, Arts (Humanities) and Commerce.

== Emblem ==
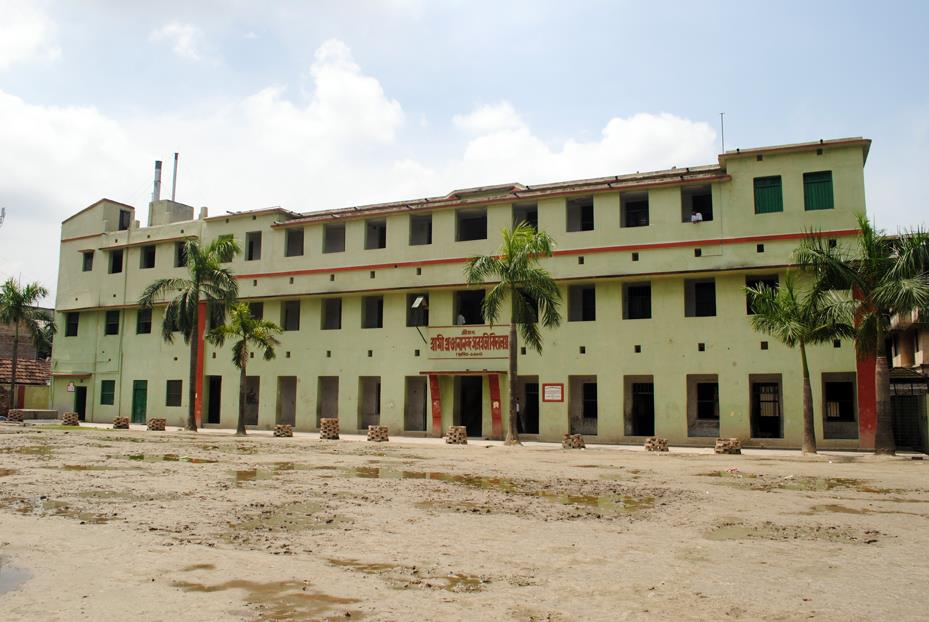
main building of ssps

The logo or emblem of the institution is knitted in a square piece of cloth and includes the school name, year of establishment and the motto: 'শ্রদ্ধাবান্ লভতে জ্ঞানম'; this Sanskrit phrase denotes that the most credited or honoured person attains the knowledge. There are four color schemes in the emblem of the institution. Each of them depicts a house from the following four houses. The houses and their respective colors are:

Sl. No-	House Name	House Color	Badge Picture
1	Projnanananda House	Red	red ssps
2	Yogesh Chandra House (founder)	Blue	blue ssps
3	Vidyasagar House	Green	green ssps
4	Vivekananda House	Yellow	yellow ssps

This color sequence recycles after every fourth roll number. The Vidyasagar House was previously named Jogiraj House, after Sri Shyamacharan Lahiri.

== School anthem ==
School begins with the prayer song Jana Gana Mana, preceded by the recitation of a short Sanskrit shloka. The shloka is the No. 9 principle of 'Taittirīya' (Bengali: তৈত্তিরীয়) Upanishads. Through this mantra it is prayed that:

"The Brahma would protect both the Acharya or teacher and disciples. Let us enjoy both equally fruit of wisdom; both of us can afford to be competent for acquiring knowledge. Let our study be effective, let our received erudition be successful. We do not let hatred for one another. Our spiritual, psychic and elemental - the three Peace let be satisfied."

=== Original Shloka ===
ॐ সহনাববতু সহ নৌ ভুনক্তু সহ বীর্যং করবাবহৈ ...
তেজস্বিনাবধীতমস্তু মা বিদ্বিষাবহৈ ...
ॐ শান্তিঃ শান্তিঃ শান্তিঃ ...

=== Translation ===
Om sahanababatu saha nou bhunaktu sahabirjang karababahai ...
Tejaswinabadhitamastu ma bidbishabahai ...
Om Shanti Shanti Shanti ...

== Headmasters ==
1. Makhanlal Chattopadhyay (1950-1956)
2. Chandrakumar Chakraborty (1956-1957)
3. Satyendranath Bose (1957-1960)
4. Manmathnath Dhar (1960-1961)
5. Amarnath Ghose (1961-1967)
6. Biresh Chandra Chakraborty (1967-1974)
7. Umashankar Ganguly (1974-1991)
8. Subodh Gopal Dhar Chakraborty (1991-2009)
9. Rajib Bandyopadhyay (2014-Present)

== Notable alumni ==
- Dr. Ramendra Lal Mukherjee (scientist and inventor with 30+ international patents)
- Dr. Prabodh Gopal Dhar Chakraborty (retired IAS officer)
- Dr. Bikramjit Basu (recipient of Shanti Swarup Bhatnagar Prize in Engineering Science, 2013)
- Buddhadeb Dasgupta (Indian Bengali poet and filmmaker)
- Avik Sarkar (Bengali writer known for his mystery, horror novels)

== See also ==
- List of schools in Howrah
