= Khila Gopimohan Siksha Sadan =

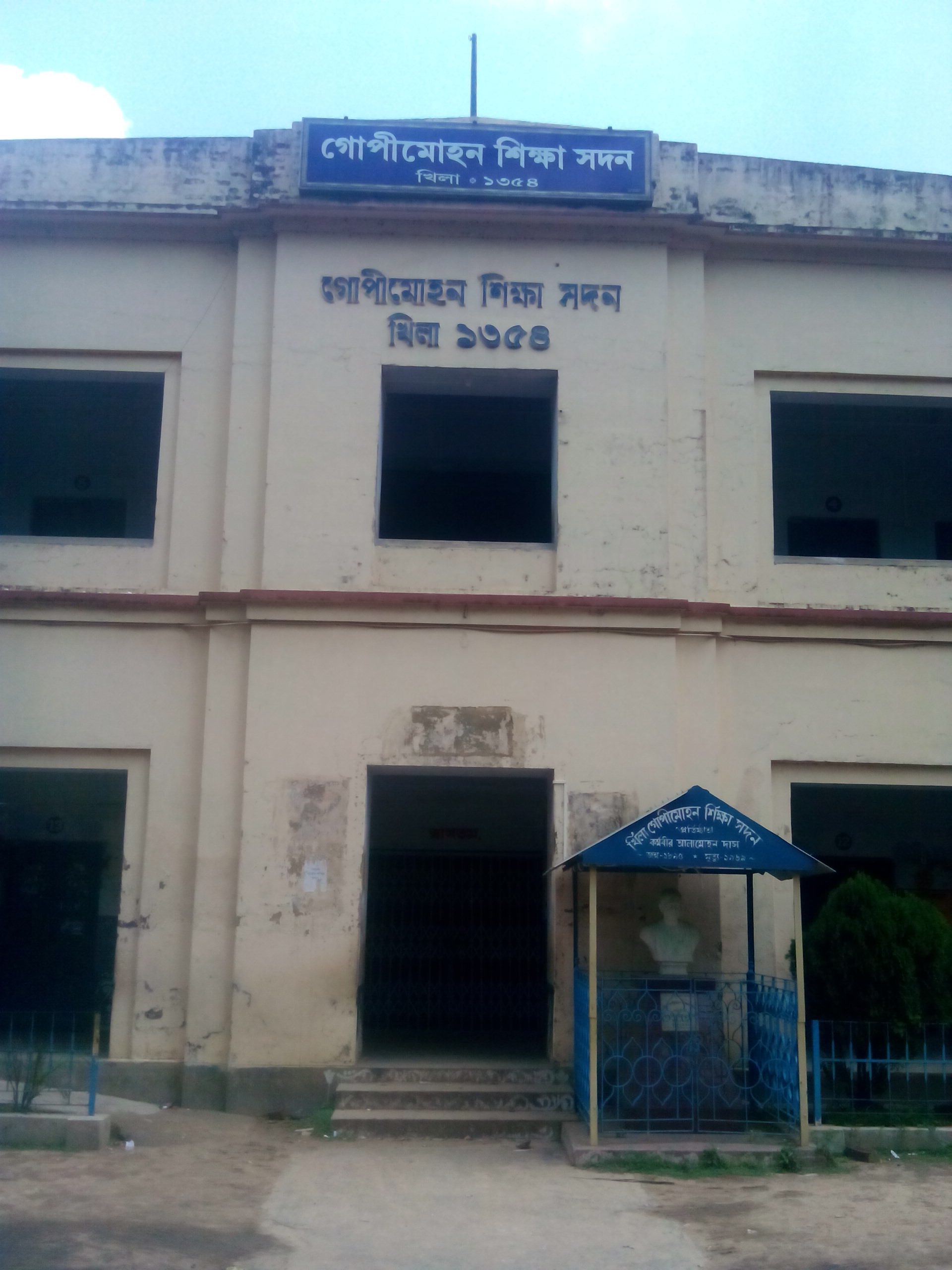
- Khila Gopimohan Siksha Sadan
- Khila, Udaynarayanpur Block, Howrah, West Bengal; India

Information
- Type: Public, Coed 10+2
- Established: January 2, 1948
- Headmaster: Sri Anup Kumar Bera (Teacher In Charge)
- Enrollment: 1500
- Campus: Rural
- Nickname: KGMSS
- Affiliation: WBBSE, WBCHSE

Khila Gopimohan Siksha Sadan is an educational institution in Udaynarayanpur block of Howrah district of the Indian state of West Bengal.

== History ==
In 1948, the famous Bengali entrepreneur Alamohan Das established this school in Khila-Baruipur, Howrah . Since its establishment in 1948, it has emerged as one of the best schools in the region. Many prominent people have spent his education at this school. Since independence, 'Gopimohan Siksha Sadan' is a unique application and identity. It is located in the Khila region along the Udaynarayanpur road.

== Current status ==
Initially this school is controlled under the School Education Department, West Bengal. There were two shifts in this school. But since 1913 the primary school was divided. The academic activities of this school start from 1st grade to 4th grade and 5th grade to 12th grade. Currently there are about 1500 students and 45 teachers in the school. The school is divided into two branches of morning and day. With the results of the Secondary and Higher Secondary Examination, this school has been one of the best places of Howrah District for several years, and the results of the school, Nobility and Cultural works in Howrah district are immensely prominent. About 1500 students read the school.

== Dress Code ==
Boys of this institution have to wear white shirt and Blue pant and girls have to wear pink check churidar.

== Education Facilities ==
In this school there is a workshop room, library, computer laboratory, Science Laboratory, Technical lessons of physics, chemistry and biology are generally taught in the sciences. Under the school there is a stage where meetings, cultural festivals are organized and every year sports competitions are organized.

== Extra Curriculum Activities ==
Sports (volleyball, Kho kho, athletics, cricket and football), cultural events, annual festivals and language competitions, science fair etc. are held.

== See also ==
- List of schools in Howrah
