= Uccha Madhyamik Pariksha =

School exam in West Bengal, India

- Acronym: HS
- Type: Paper-based; Standardized Test
- Administrator: West Bengal Council of Higher Secondary Education (WBCHSE)
- Skills tested: Subject-specific knowledge (Science, Commerce, Humanities)
- Purpose: Standardized exam at completion of Higher Secondary education as well as admission to the undergraduate courses in various higher education institutions in the State of West Bengal.
- Year started: 1978 (under WBCHSE)
- Duration: March - April (upto 2025); September (Sem III) and March–April (Sem IV)
- Score range: 0 to 100 per subject
- Offered: Once a year
- Regions: West Bengal, India
- Languages: Bengali, English, Santali (depending on the medium of instruction)
- Prerequisites: Must have passed Madhyamik Pariksha (Grade 10)
- Website: wbchse.wb.gov.in

Uccha Madhyamik Pariksha, also known as Higher Secondary Examination (HS), is a public examination conducted by the West Bengal Council of Higher Secondary Education (WBCHSE). It is the final school-level exam in West Bengal, held at the end of Grade 12. Students from various streams, including Science, Commerce, and Humanities, participate in this exam. The result of this examination plays a critical role in determining admission to higher education institutions.

== History ==
The exam is conducted by West Bengal Council of Higher Secondary Education. It was established under the West Bengal Council of Higher Secondary Education Act, 1975, to manage and regulate higher secondary education in West Bengal. First HS examination was held in 1978. By 2023, around 8.5 lakh students took the exam.

== Structure & Format ==
The Uccha Madhyamik Pariksha follows a structured format with theory and practical examinations, depending on the subject. The theory portion typically carries more weight, with practicals applicable to subjects like Chemistry, Biology, and Physics. Semester system was introduced to the students in class XI from the session 2024-25 and in XII from the session 2025-26.

=== Semester System ===
The new semester system introduced by the West Bengal Council of Higher Secondary Education (WBCHSE) for Uccha Madhyamik Pariksha (Class 11 and 12) divides the curriculum into four semesters to ease the academic burden and align with the state's education reforms.

Semester 1 (XI)
Covers foundational subjects, including two languages and three elective subjects.
Exam conducted in September, based on Multiple Choice Questions (MCQs).
Semester 2 (XI)
Continuation of advanced topics in the chosen subjects.
Exams conducted in March, with Short Answer Type Questions (SAQs) and Descriptive Questions (DQs).
Practical and project evaluations are done in this semester.
Semester 3 (XII)
This semester contributes directly to the Uccha Madhyamik final exam.
Exam held in September, based on MCQs.
Semester 4 (XII)
Final preparations for the Uccha Madhyamik exam.
Exam held in April, based on SAQs and DQs.
Practical and project evaluations are conducted during this period.

== See also ==
- Madhyamik Pariksha
- West Bengal Board of Secondary Education
- West Bengal Council of Higher Secondary Education
