= Sunrise English Medium School =

School in West Bengal, India

Sunrise (English Medium) School
- Belur, Howrah, West Bengal, 711202; India

Information
- Type: Private, co-educational
- Motto: Vidya Dadati Vinayam (Education manifests modesty)
- Established: 3 March 1975
- Founder: Shri Raghunath Prasad, Smt. Parvati Devi Prasad
- Grades: Pre-primary – XII
- Language: English
- Campus type: Urban
- Affiliation: CISCE
- Website: sunriseeducation.org

Sunrise (English Medium) School is a co-educational English-medium institution located in Belur, Howrah, West Bengal, India. The school is affiliated to the Council for the Indian School Certificate Examinations (CISCE), New Delhi, and prepares students for the ICSE (Class X) and ISC (Class XII) examinations.

== History ==
The school was founded on 3 March 1975 by Shri Raghunath Prasad and Smt. Parvati Devi Prasad under the Sunrise Education Society, a registered body. Foundation Day is celebrated annually on 3 March.

== Location ==
The institution is located at 28/1 G.T. Road and 9, Tarachand Ganguly Street, Belur Math, Howrah – 711202, West Bengal, India.

== Academics ==
Sunrise offers classes from pre-primary level to Class XII.

- Medium of instruction: English
- Streams at ISC level: Science, Commerce and Humanities
- Affiliation: CISCE (ICSE/ISC)

== Student life ==
The school conducts co-curricular activities such as debates, quizzes, dramatics, art, music and sports.

- Sports facilities include football, cricket, basketball, badminton and indoor games.
- Publications: the annual school magazine Ru and the newsletter Suntimes.
- House system: Ruby, Sapphire, Topaz and Emerald.

== Administration ==
The school is managed by the Sunrise Education Society.

== Motto ==
The motto of the school is the Sanskrit maxim विद्या ददाति विनयम् (Vidya Dadati Vinayam), which translates to "Education Manifests Modesty".

== See also ==
- List of schools in Howrah

== Official Website ==
- https://www.sunriseeducation.org/
