= St. Xavier's School, Durgapur =

St. Xavier's School

Location
- Bidhannagar, ABL Township; Durgapur; India; 23°31′40″N 87°20′22″E

Information
- Type: Private primary and secondary school
- Motto: Like Gold in a Furnace
- Religious affiliation: Catholicism
- Denomination: Jesuits
- Patron saint: Francis Xavier
- Established: 1963; 63 years ago
- Headmaster: Fr.Zenith William, S.J.
- Faculty: 60
- Gender: Boys
- Enrollment: 2,240
- Language: English-medium
- Sports: Football, cricket, volleyball, table tennis, basketball, badminton, track and field, 100m race, 200m race, Wheel and Barrow, Relay race, long jump
- Affiliations: Certificate of Secondary Education Examination; Indian School Certificate
- Website: www.sxsdgp.edu.in

St. Xavier's School, Durgapur, is a private Catholic primary and secondary school for boys, located in Durgapur, West Bengal, India. The unaided English-medium school was established by the Belgian Jesuits in 1963. The school is selective in its admissions.

== History ==
St Xavier's School, Durgapur, was situated in several places from the first proposal for its founding in 1960 until its permanent location in 1967. It occupied premises at an ophthalmic factory of MAMC, at a primary school, at MAMC township, at ABL township, and at DSP-Hindustan Steel. The foundation stone at the present location was laid on 18 February 1966 on land permanently leased to the Calcutta Jesuits by the West Bengal government. In January 1967, St. Xavier's School was transferred from the MAMC Primary School to its new and permanent building. Fr. A. Wautier, S.J., from Belgium was the chief architect in bringing the school to completion. In 1969, after the Sisters of Apostolic Carmel raised their school to a high school, Xavier became boy's.

In 2001, on the expiration of a 35-year lease, the DSP authorities demanded a large sum of money for further lease, and the Jesuits decided to move out of DSP after a five years grace period. The then Headmaster tried his best to get a piece of land near the Bidhan Nagar close to the present main school for relocation of the primary wing so as to separate the secondary and eventually a 10+2 section, but this proved futile. In May 2006 the primary from Mirabai section was shifted to a new wing at the main campus. As of 2013, Xavier has classes up to std. 10. Xavier is an English Medium School affiliated to the council for Indian Certificate of Secondary Education, New Delhi.

== Campus ==
The school campus covers 40 acres, a third of it tropical trees. It has three football grounds, an auditorium, badminton, table tennis, volleyball, and basketball courts, gymnasium, and a meditation room. The school has currently upgraded some of it classrooms into smartclasses with the co-operation of TATA ClassEdge.

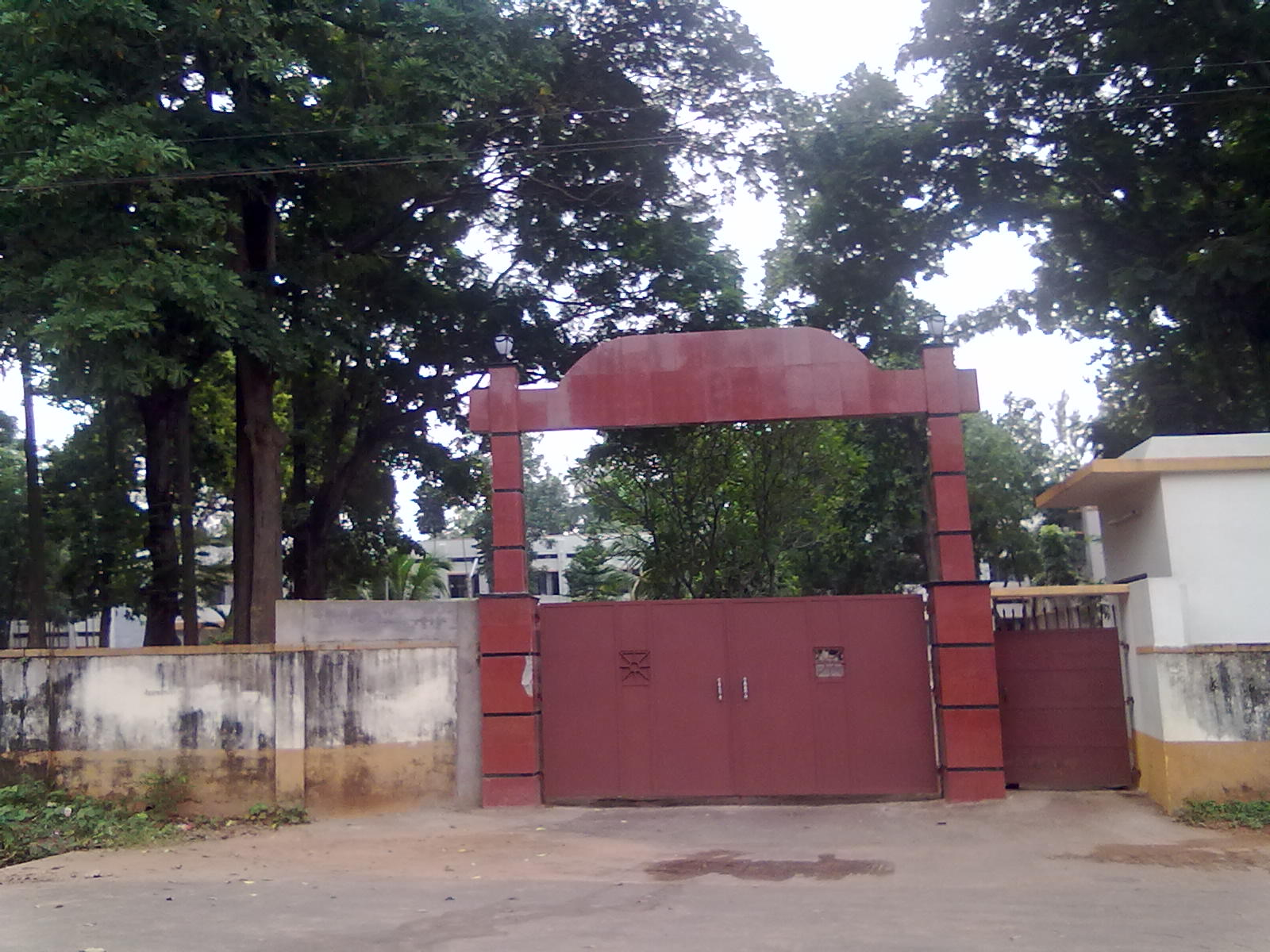
Main Gate of St Xaviers School Durgapur

== Curriculum and activities ==
The school offers the Certificate of Secondary Education Examination and Indian School Certificate. The subjects include science, Maths, English, and options for Hindi and Bengali. Computer applications is taught as a separate subject, and students participate in the Inter-Jesuit elocution and extempore competition every year. The school also has introduced elocution, debate, quiz, essay writing, and painting. Co-curricular activities include cultural committee, sports and games committee, quiz club, computer club, nature club, and literary clubs for English, Bengali, and Hindi.

St. Xavier's football team participates in the annual Inter-School Football Tournament of Durgapur.

== See also ==
- List of Jesuit schools
- List of schools in West Bengal
