= Dankuni Siddiquia senior Madrasa =

Coordinates: 22.6733°N 88.2992°E

Dankuni Siddiquia Senior Madrasa (Fazil)
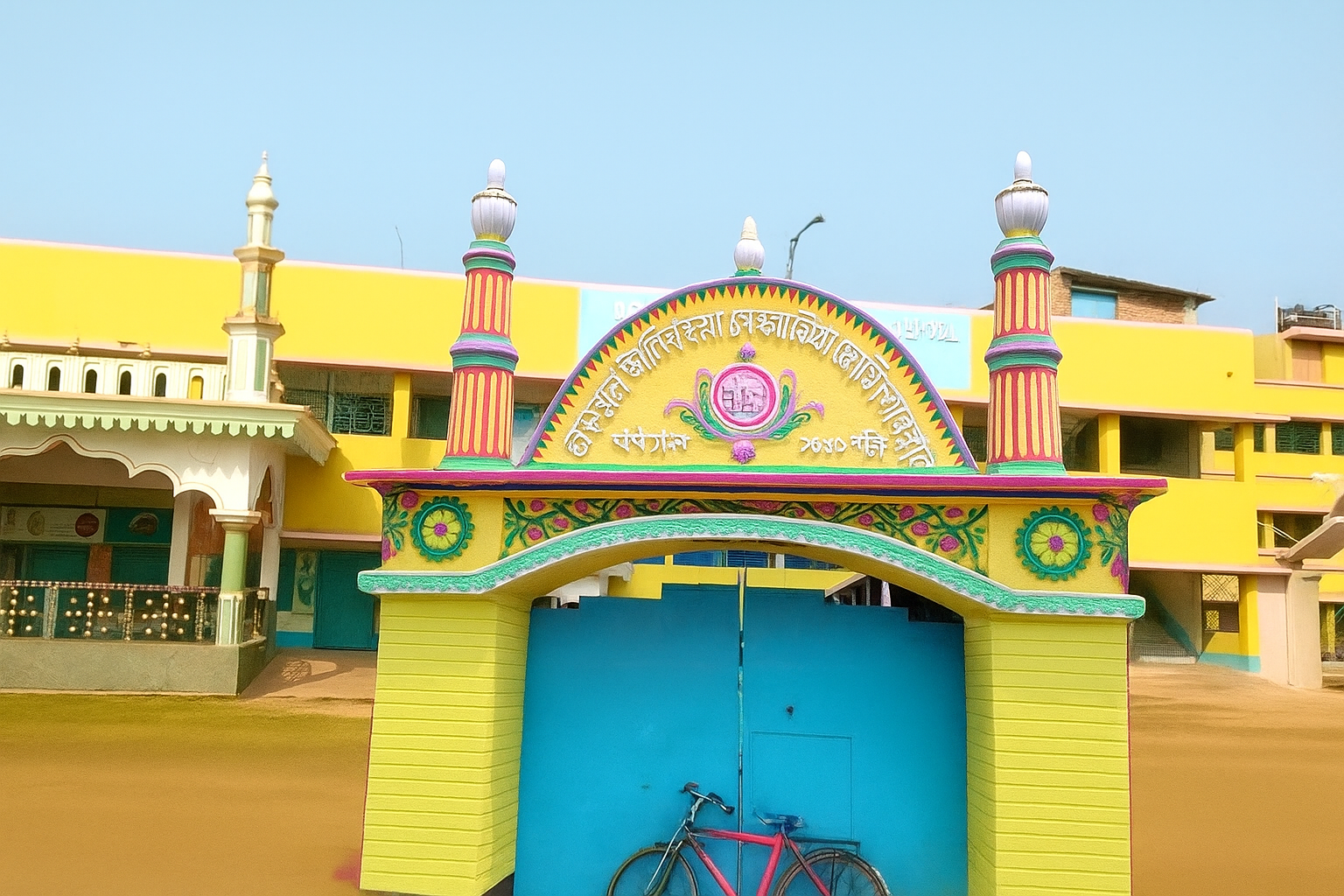
- ডানকুনি সিদ্দিকিয়া সিনিয়র মাদ্রাসার (হালকা এডিট করা ছবি)

Location
- Mollapara, Gobra, Dankuni, Hooghly; West Bengal, 712310; India

Information
- Type: Madrasa (Higher Secondary)
- Motto: Blending religious and modern education
- Established: 1952
- Principal: Mohammad Idris Ali
- Faculty: 25
- Grades: KG to 12th grade
- Enrollment: 500+
- Language: Bengali
- Campus type: Urban
- Affiliation: West Bengal Board of Madrasah Education

Dankuni Siddiquia Senior Madrasa is a madrasa located in the Dankuni area of Hooghly district, West Bengal. It was established in 1952 by Abdul Hai Siddiqui. It offers higher secondary education and follows a blend of religious and modern education.

== History ==
Dankuni Siddiquia Senior Madrasa was established in 1952, by an Islamic scholar and educationist Abdul Hai Siddiqui. Since its establishment, it has gradually expanded and currently offers education up to the Higher Secondary level.

== Location ==
The madrasa is located in the Hooghly District's Dankuni area. It is accessible from Dankuni Railway Station.

== Academic system ==
Dankuni Siddiquia Senior Madrasa offers higher secondary education and follows a blend of religious and modern education. The syllabus includes various subjects such as Bengali, English, Mathematics, Science, History, and Islamic Studies.

== Administration and management ==
The madrasa operates under the West Bengal Board of Madrasah Education and is an aided madrasa recognized by the board.
