= Islampur High School =

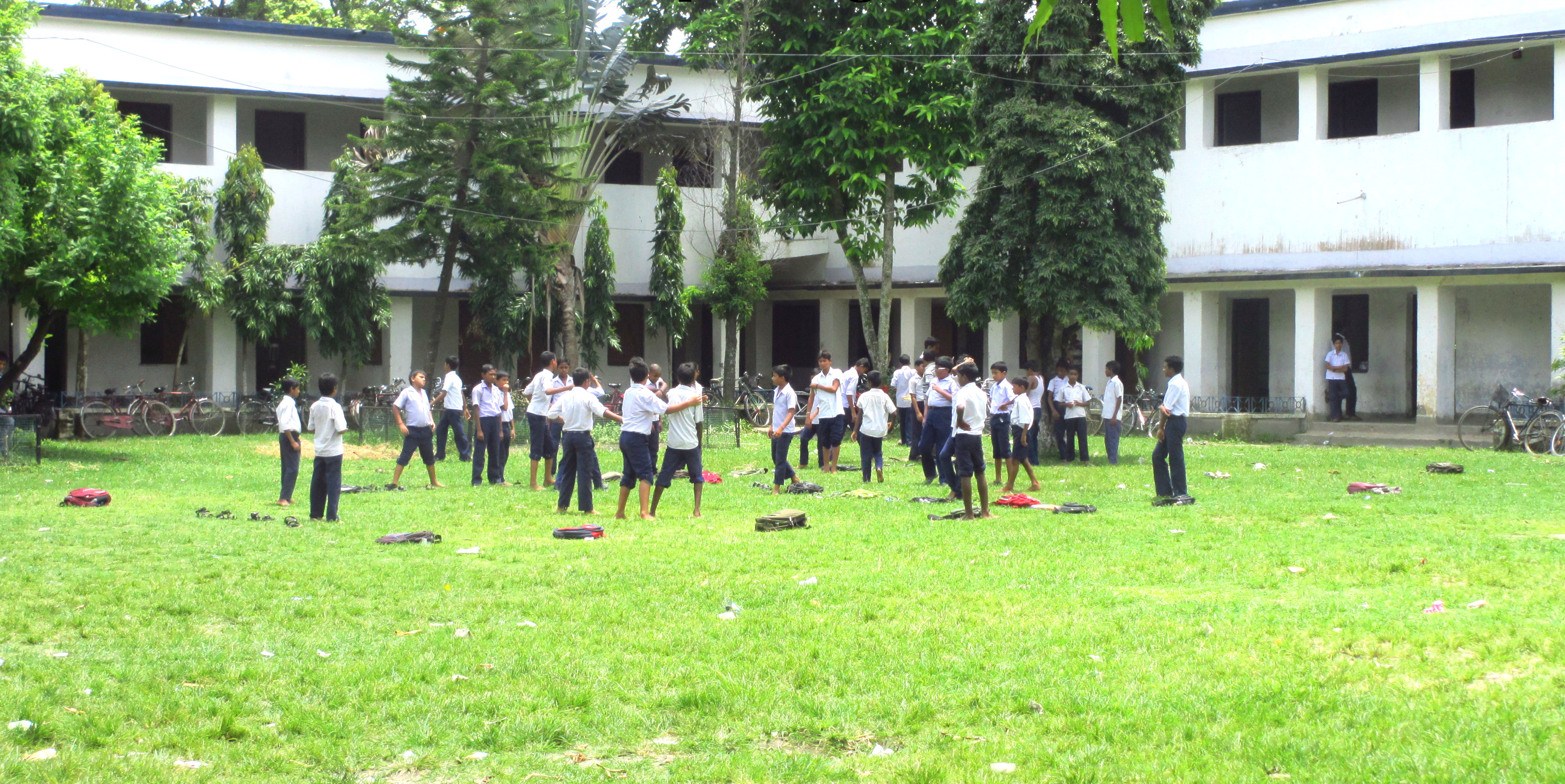

Location
- Bus stand, P. W. D more Boi Para; Islampur, West Bengal, 733202; India; 26.2557135°N 88.1828116°E

Information
- Established: 1958
- Principal: Mohammad Salimuddin or Selimuddin
- Gender: Boys
- Enrolment: 2,200

Islampur High School is located in the area ward no. 10 of Islampur Municipality in Islampur City, North Dinajpur, West Bengal, India. This school is situated near the New Bus Stand and is beside NH31.

Islampur High School is under the control of West Bengal Board of Secondary Education and West Bengal Council of Higher Secondary Education.

== History ==
The school was established in 1958.

In 2012, students protested because they were concerned that the government was planning to stop teaching in three languages (Hindi, Urdu, Bengali) in the school.

In 2016 the school's teachers went on hunger strike to protest about inhuman treatment by the headteacher. The head agreed to their demands.

In 2019 the school was named by the education department as one of the four best schools in the state. Examination results for the school were good in 2019.

== Facility ==
The two-storied school building is identical with a rectangular shape, with a playground at the centre. There are currently no residential and transport facilities available. In 2019 there were concerns about conditions at the school's hostel.

Classes from 5th standard to 12 standard are taught here.

It is a boys' school only. The languages in which subjects are taught are Bengali, Hindi, and Urdu. The school has laboratories and a library.

== Notable alumni ==
- Md. Manzar Hussain Anjum, IAS Officer (AIR 125th in UPSC 2021 Civil Service Exam)

== See also ==
- Education in India
- List of schools in India
- Education in West Bengal
