= Bagnan High School =

Location
- Near Bagnan Station Road (North); Bagnan, Howrah; West Bengal, India; 711303; 22.464342°N 87.969412°E

Information
- Type: State school
- Motto: তদ্বিদ্ধি প্রনিপাতেন পরিপ্রশ্নেন সেবয়া
- Established: May 3, 1854; 172 years ago
- Founder: Hem Chandra Ghosh
- Headmaster: Bhaskar Chandra Adak
- Staff: Full-time teachers: 64; Teaching assistants: 5 Part-time teachers: 5 Overall: 69; Support staff 9
- Grades: V to XII
- Gender: Boys
- Enrollment: 3,000+
- Student to teacher ratio: 55:1
- Classes offered: Science; Commerce; Arts
- Language: Bengali
- Classrooms: 50+
- Colours: Uniform Colours School Colours
- Publication: অন্বীক্ষা
- Affiliation: WBBSE Index- F2-012; WBCHSE Code- 106093

Bagnan High School, known informally as BHS or Bagnan Boys' High School, is a school in Bagnan in the Howrah District of West Bengal. The school is located near the local railway and police stations, and the registry office. This school is the first "higher secondary" school in the Bagnan I Block as well as the Uluberia subdivision.

== History ==
The school was established by providence in 1854 by Hem Chandra Ghosh, the Zaminder of the village of Chandrapur. The school relocated to Khadinan Shibtala, then Bagnan Rathtala. Finally it moved to its current site, near Bagnan Registry Office in c. 1935. The school became a Higher Secondary School, with diversified courses, in 1957. This made the school the first in the subdivision to engage in this transition.

== Facilities ==
The school has one campus comprising five buildings, each one named by a religious figure. Across the site, there are more than 50 classrooms, a staff room, offices, a library containing more than 6,000 books, of styles including novels, critical works, and autobiographies. and four science laboratories for biology, chemistry, and physics. These are located in the science building. Computers were first introduced in the school in 2001, in collaboration with NIIT and WEBEL—two institutions of computer education.

== Result Statistics ==
| Year | Name | Marks | Exam | Remark |
|---|---|---|---|---|
| 2019 | Kiran Mondal | 98% | WB 12th Exam 2019 | 6th Rank in West Bengal |
| 2004 | Arka Santra | 95.25% | WB 10th Exam 2004 | 10th Rank in West Bengal |

== Achievements ==
Bagnan High School was recognised as the Best School in West Bengal in the year 2020 by the School Education Department, Government of West Bengal. There were 8 students from Bagnan High School in the Madhyamik Examination (WB 10th Examination) 2020 top 20 merit list in Howrah district
