= Rockvale Academy =

- Kalimpong, West Bengal; India

Information
- Type: Educational institution
- Motto: "Optima Thule"
- Established: 1984
- Founder: Lt. Mr. B.B. Pradhan
- School district: Kalimpong
- Principal: Capt. Prakash Mani Pradhan
- Affiliation: CISCE
- Website: www.rockvaleacademy.com

Rockvale Academy is a coeducational boarding school located in the hill town of Kalimpong in the district of Darjeeling, West Bengal, India. It was founded by the late Mr. B.B. Pradhan in 1984 and celebrated its silver jubilee in 2009. English is used as the medium of instruction.

Rockvale Academy is affiliated to the I.C.S.E. and I.S.C. Board, New Delhi, and offers prescribed course in Science, Arts and Commerce at the +2 level. It has classes from nursery to XII. It is a member of the AHLIS (Association of Heads of Listed ICSE Schools of Darjeeling District) which has a strength of 28 schools from the district of Darjeeling and neighbouring Sikkim.

Rockvale opened an affiliated tertiary education institution, the B.B.Pradhan College of Management Studies, in 2003.

Students come from as far away as Bangladesh, Nepal, Bhutan and Thailand.

== History ==
The institution was established in 1984 by the late Mr. Bhanu Bhakta Pradhan . He discovered a plot of land for sale in the 9th mile area of Kalimpong. His initial plan was to set up a hotel. This is apparent from the small size of some rooms in the main building. However, he was persuaded by his closest friends to set up an educational institution. The school opened on 11 March 1984 with just over 30 students.

The school was granted permanent affiliation to the ICSE Board in 1992 and became an examination centre in 1998. It was the first privately owned school in Kalimpong to be awarded the permanent affiliation.

The school introduced the +2 level in 1997.

In 2008, Rockvale Academy was chosen as an IELTS centre by the British Council.

The school's founder, Bhanu Bhakta Pradhan, held the post of Director of Rockvale Academy until his death in 2002.

== Inter-house competitions ==
Rockvale has four houses that engage in inter-house competitions in sports such as volleyball, table tennis, basketball and badminton, as well as co-curricular activities such as elocution, debates, quizzes, spelling bee and extempore. The house that collects the most points at the end of the academic session is declared the "champion house" for that year.

== Infrastructure ==
Apart from the main building at 9th mile, Kalimpong, the school is constructing a Sports Complex and Rockvale International Hostel at Chiboo Busty, Kalimpong.

== See also ==
- List of schools in West Bengal
