= Ramakrishna Mission Shilpayatana =

Trade institute in West Bengal, India

Ramakrishna Mission Shilpavidyala (Ramakrishna Mission Shilpayatana)
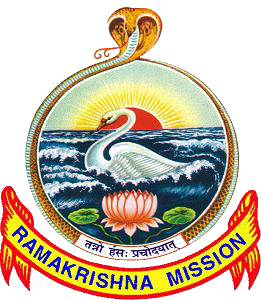
- Emblem

Location
- Belur Math, Howrah district, West Bengal, India; 22.632639°N 88.352801°E

Information
- Motto: Atmano mokshartham jagat hitaya cha (आत्मनो मोक्षार्थं जगद्धिताय च) (আত্মো মোক্ষার্থম জগৎ হিতায়া চ) (For one’s own salvation and for the welfare of the world)
- Established: Sector One 1921; Sector Two 1963
- Principal: Swami Gunindrananda.
- Campus: Urban
- Colors: uniform Blue, Sky
- Athletics: Volleyball, Football, Cricket
- Affiliations: Ramakrishna Mission Shilpayatana; National Council for Vocational Training(NCVT)for Industrial training institute / ITI; West Bengal State Council of Vocational Education and Training(WBSCVT) for (Higher Secondary Vocational)
- Administration Staff: Br. Nageshachaitanya.; Br. Ranajit.; Sumit Bhattacharyya.; Kamal Maity.; Nandadulal Mandal.; Bikash Chaudhuri.; Samiran Chakraborty.; Bharat Chandra Roy.; Kanchan Chakraborty.; Jagat Kumar Das.; Pashupati Nath Mukherjee.; Sri Sourav Banerjee.; Sri Srimanta Chakraborty.
- Website: www.itirkmbelur.ac.in

Ramakrishna Mission Shilpavidyala (Ramakrishna Mission Shilpayatana) (RKMS) is a private Industrial Training Institute and (Govt. Aided) HS Vocational. It has four I.T.I. trade courses - electrician, fitter, turner and welder (gas & electric) - under Craftsman Training Scheme (C.T.S.) affiliated to National Council for Vocational Training (N.C.V.T), New Delhi and HS Vocational for the trade Electrical and Computer which is affiliated to W.B. State Council of Technical and Vocational Education and Skill Development (WBSTC & VE & SD). It was established in sector one 1921, sector two 1963 as a Government Sponsored Junior Technical School, during the birth centenary celebrations of Swami Vivekananda. Swamiji is the greatest and most remarkable philosopher sage and karma yogi one comes across in modern India, who sailed to the United States in 1893 to find means for the material development of the masses of India. He represented Hinduism at the Chicago Parliament of Religions. This institution has been nurtured with Swami Vivekananda's ideas to help build a bridge for the masses, especially in rural India, to connect to modern industry. Hundreds of youth who would otherwise have had no scope to go in for higher education have been trained by us in skills and are gainfully employed in various well-known industries. It is located in Belur Math, P.O. Belur Math, D.T. Howrah, Pin- 711202, Belur, West Bengal.

== Special note ==
W.e.f. August 2019 session, as per DGT order, Ramakrishna Mission Shilpayatana is now merged into Ramakrishna Mission Shilpavidyalaya Belurmath. All trades affiliated to Shilpayatana will be conducted under the name Shilpavidyalaya. Location of the campus is also unchanged.

== History ==
In the Second Meeting of Ramakrishna Mission Association at Calcutta on 5 May 1897 presided by Swami Vivekananda, the following two were included while stating the objectives of the Mission: i) to train men so as to make them competent to teach such knowledge and sciences as are conductive to the material and spiritual welfare of the masses. ii) to promote and encourage arts and industries.

- To fulfill Swamiji’s dream, Ramakrishna Mission established an Industrial School in the year 1921 at Belur Math.
- In 1963 Ramakrishna Mission Shilpayatana was established as a Government Sponsored Junior Technical School.
- In the early 1990s, the Junior Technical School courses were abandoned and four new I.T.I. trade courses - Electrician, Fitter, Turner and Welder(Gas & Electric) - were started under Craftsman Training Scheme (CTS) affiliated to National Council for Vocational Training (N.C.V.T), New Delhi. The institute was recognized as a Government Sponsored Industrial Training Centre.
- Parallel to these above developments, in the year 1976, H.S. Vocational stream was started under the West Bengal Higher Secondary Council and continued up to 2005. The Government of West Bengal next formed a new Statutory Body called West Bengal State Council of Vocational Education and Training (W.B.S.C.V.E.& T.). Under this council, two 10+2 level courses called Higher Secondary (Vocational) course in Engineering and Technology Stream are now conducted in this institute - a) Maintenance and Repair of Electrical Domestic Appliances and b) Computer application and Maintenance. Students undergoing this scheme are eligible for lateral entry into second year of Diploma Courses.
- Short term courses (Modular Employability Skills or M.E.S.) were also started under Skill Development Initiative Scheme(SDIS) of D.G.E.&T., Government of India. These courses are of 120 hours or 3 months duration. Two courses are now conducted under this scheme - a) Basic Electrical Training and b) Rewinding of AC/DC Motors.
- The institute has been granted self-financing status and has now been converted into a Private Industrial Training Institute w.e.f. 1 November 2013 as per D.G.E.&T. Norms.

== Courses ==
There are two sections in the institute - I.T.I. and H.S. (Vocational)

=== Schemes running in the institute under NCVT ===
Name of the Scheme	Total Capacity	Duration	Admitted in current Financial year	Current Status
Craftsmen Training Scheme	74	2 year/1 year	yes	In progress up to July 2014
Modular Employable Scheme	40	3 months	yes	Admissions in hold as per directive of the SSDIS, West Bengal
Other Schemes	-	-	-	-

=== Trades Affiliated to NCVT ===
Name of the Trade(linked to the respective Syllabus with DGET website)	No. of units	Shifts Running (I/II/III)	Seating Capacity per Unit	Total Seating Capacity	Affiliation Date/ Copy of DGET order Link (SCANNED)
Welding	I	I	16	16	
Fitter	I	I	21	21	
Turner	I	I	16	16	
Draughtsman Civil	I	I	16	16	
Draughtsman Mechanical	I	I	16	16	
Electrician	I	I	21	21	
Electronics	I	I	16	16	

=== Higher Secondary (Vocational) Courses under WBSCVE&T ===
Trade	Intake Capacity	Main Subjects	Other Subjects
Electrical Maintenance & Installation Group(ETEM)	25	Maintenance & Repair of ElectricalDomestic Appliances (MREDA) Electrical Wiring & Installation of Motors (EWIM)	Communicative English, Bengali, Basic Science(PCM), Workshop Practices, Technical Drawing, Entrepreneurship Basic Engg. Theory, Engineering Mechanics
Computer Maintenance & Networking Group (ETCM)	25	Basic Computer Maintenance & Networking(BCMN) Introduction to Visual Basic & its Application(IVBA)	-same as above-

== Admission Criteria ==
=== I.T.I. ===
A one-hour written test (medium is English/Bengali) is conducted for a total of 50 marks based on Maths, Physics, Chemistry and English of the entry qualification level. Shortlisted candidates are called for interview before the finalizing of the list of selected candidates. Forms will be available after the publication of the West Bengal Class X (Madhyamik) Results around May–June.

Interested candidates may collect the forms from the institute's office or download from this website and submit by hand at the office. Enquires by phone are discouraged. All information will be displayed at the institute's notice board and the Official website (http://www.itirkmbelur.ac.in).

Name of the I.T.I. Trade under NCVT	Duration of Training	Eligibility Qualification
Welder (G&E)	1 year	Class VIII
Turner	2 years	Class X (Madhyamik)
Fitter	2 years	Class X (Madhyamik)
Electrician	2 years	Class X (Madhyamik)

=== Higher Secondary (Vocational) ===
Forms will be available after the publication of the West Bengal Class X (Madhyamik) Results around May–June. Shortlisted candidates are called for interview before the finalizing of the list of selected candidates.

Interested candidates may collect the forms from the institute's office or download from this website and submit by hand at the office. Enquires by phone are discouraged. All information will be displayed at the institute's notice board and the Official website (http://www.itirkmbelur.ac.in).

Name of the HS (Vocational) Trade under WBSCVET	Duration of Training	Eligibility Qualification
Computer (ETCM)	2 years	Class X (Madhyamik)
Electrician (ETEM)	2 years	Class X (Madhyamik)

== Uniform ==
The school of Ramakrishna Mission Shilpavidyala (Ramakrishna Mission Shilpayatana) uniform is navy blue pant with Sky shirt.

== Golden Jubilee ==
Ramakrishna Mission Shilpavidyala (Ramakrishna Mission Shilpayatana) celebrated a Golden Jubilee Ceremony on 23 February 2014.

Thanks to all students and ex-students, Instructors and ex-Instructors, and well-wishers of Shilpayatana who attended the Golden Jubilee Inaugural Function in Vivekananda Sabhagriha at Belur Math campus at 3.30 p.m. We were blessed by the holy presence of Srimat Swami Smarananandaji Maharaj, Vice-President of Ramakrishna Math & Ramakrishna Mission, and also Srimat Swami Sarvadevanandaji and Srimat Swami Girishanandaji, all of whom were intimately connected with Shilpayatana during these five decades!

— A message from Ramakrishna Mission Shilpayatana, via the official website

== See also ==
- Swami Vivekananda
- Belur Math
- Ramakrishna Mission
- Ramakrishna Mission Vidyamandira
- Ramakrishna Mission Vivekananda University
- Industrial Training Institute
- West Bengal State Council of Vocational Education and Training
- Baranagar Ramakrishna Mission
