= Sargachi Ramakrishna Mission High School =

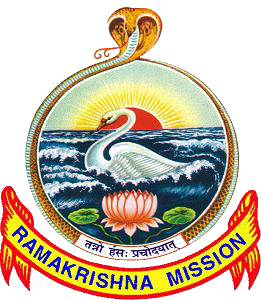
- Emblem

Location
- Sargachi, Murshidabad, West Bengal, India
- Coordinates: 24.023042°N 88.251129°E

Information
- Motto: Atmano mokshartham jagat hitaya cha (आत्मनो मोक्षार्थं जगद्धिताय च) (For one’s own salvation and for the welfare of the world)
- Established: 1897(124 years ago)
- Classes: V to X XI, XII
- Affiliations: WBBSE (for Madhyamik); WBCHSE (for Higher Secondary)

Sargachi Ramakrishna Mission High School is a boys-only day and boarding school in West Bengal, India, and it is located in Sargachi, of the Murshidabad district. The school was founded in 1897 by Swami Akhndananda ji Maharaj. It is affiliated to the West Bengal Council of Higher Secondary Education and West Bengal Board of Secondary Education.

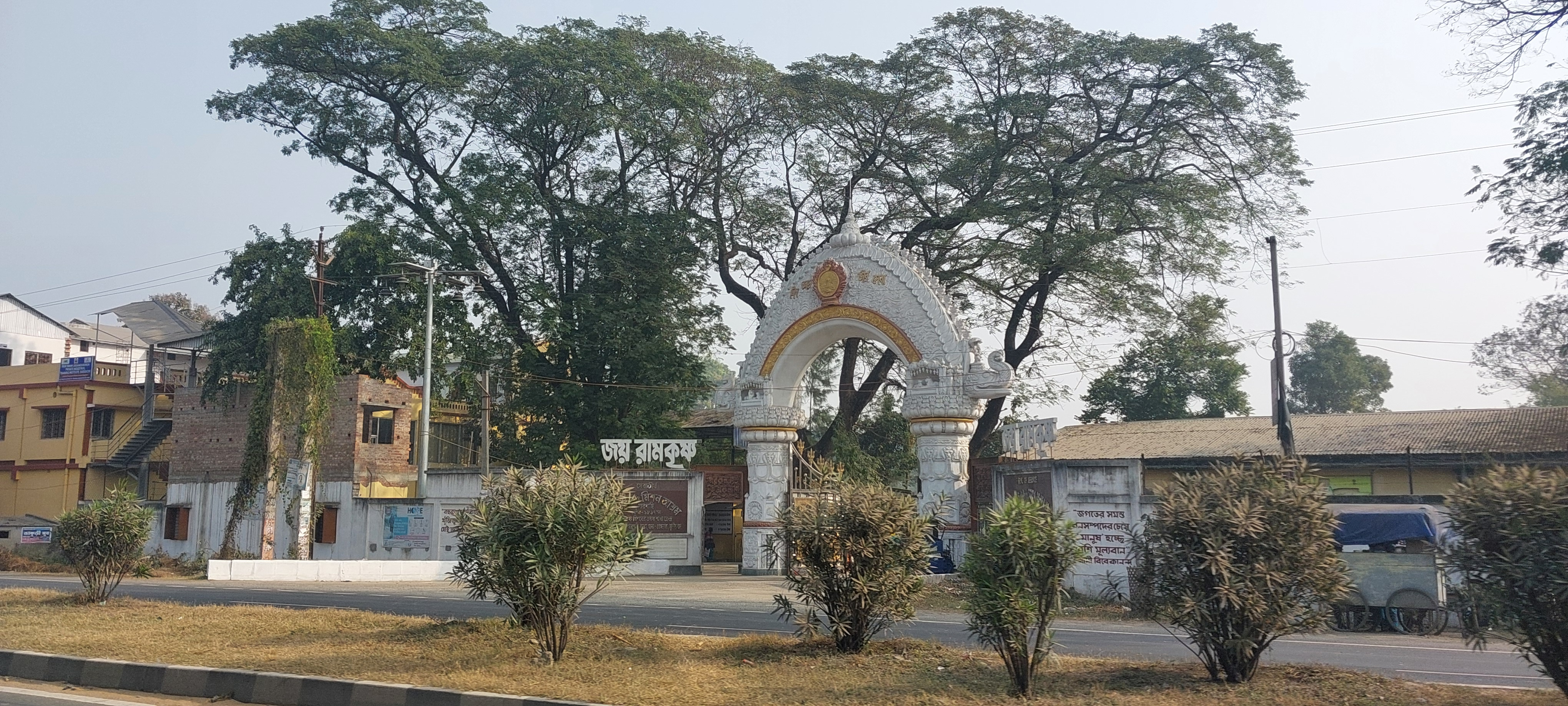
Front gate of Ramakrishna Mission Ashrama at Sargachi

== History ==
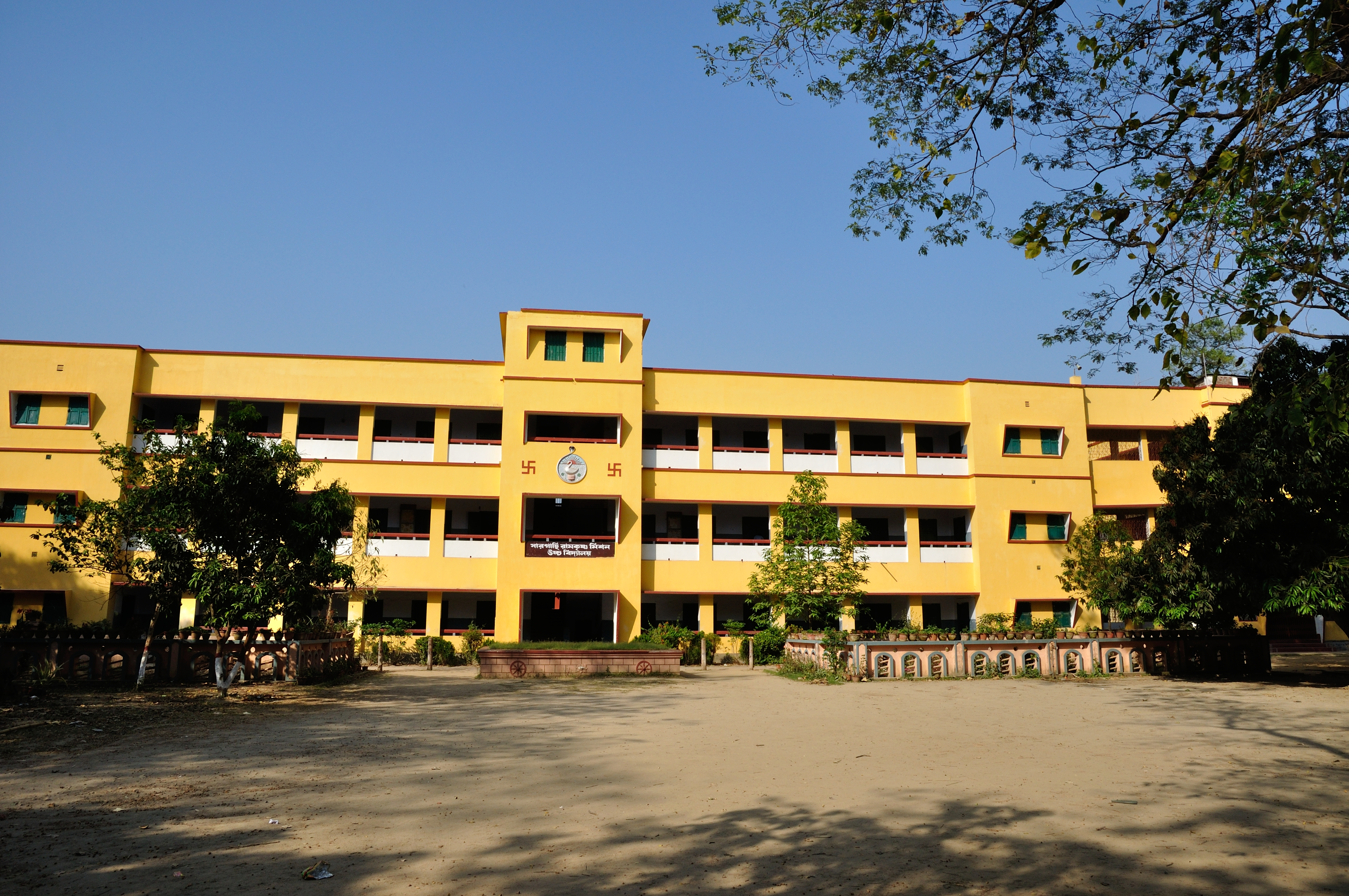
Main building of school

Swami Akhandananda Maharaj, a direct disciple of Sri Ramakrishna, established this institution in 1897. He came to the nearby village Mahula for helping the famine affected poor villagers of Murshidabad on 15 May 1897. The present site of Sargachi ashrama was taken over in 1913. Akhandananda started an orphanage and primary school initially to provide quality education to the local students.

At present, this is a higher secondary school now. There is a hostel for about 65 boys besides the school, where about 12 students from each class between V to X reside. This institution has been governed by many respected missionaries of the Ramakrishna mission.
