= Hooghly Gour Hari Harijan Vidya Mandir =

Location
- Hooghly Ghat Station Rd, Chowk Bazar, Olaichanditala; Kolkata, West Bengal, 712103; India; 22.9118664°N 88.3965107°E

Information
- Established: 1921
- Gender: Co-educational
- Language: Hindi

Hooghly Gour Hari Harijan Vidya Mandir is a co-ed school in Chawk Bazar near Bandel/Chinsurah, India, on the bank of the Hooghly River. The school was inaugurated by Mahatma Gandhi on 8 March 1921. Since then it has been a well-known center providing primary, secondary and higher secondary education in Hindi medium.

The nearest railway station is Hooghly Ghat (1 km) on the Bandel – Naihati line. It is adjacent to Hooghly BT (B.Ed.) college and shares its boundary with Hooghly Sub Post office.

This school caters to Grade 1 to 12 standard students and offers courses in Science, Arts, and Commerce for Higher Secondary (11&12) standards. It is affiliated to the West Bengal Board of Secondary Education and West Bengal Council of Higher Secondary Education. Current Head Master of the school is Shri R.P.Singh

== History ==
The school was first started by two of the famous patriots and lawyers late Nagendra Nath Mukhopadhyay and late Gour Hari Som on 8 March 1921 with the help of the current minister of Bengal Honourable Sree Bhupati Majumdar and Sree Prafulla Chandra Sen.

Initially, the school was started at the Kathghara Lane house of Khagendra Nath Ghosh. Classes were held at the two-storied building of late Rasiddan Nabi Sahab from 1921 to 1932 where it was honored by the gracious presence of Mahatma Gandhi, Deshbandhu Chittaranjan Das, Netaji Subhash Chandra Bose, Acharya Rayjee, Sarojini Nayadu, Yamuna Lal Prasad and Honourable Governor of West Bengal C. Rajagopalachari

In 1932 the school was locked and sealed by the British Government due to political reasons. In 1933 the school was restarted by late Nagendra Nath Mukhopadhyay and late Gour Hari Som with 10 Harijan students and a new name — Harijan Vidyamandir instead of the old name Vidyamandir — which was again changed to Gour Hari Harijan Vidyamandir after the death of the co-founder Gour Hari Som.

In 1934 the school was moved to a new building that was built on the land of the municipality.

In 1944 the government granted assistance to the organization but due to political reasons, the school started the benefit from 1947.

During the freedom of the Republic of India from British Raj the school was successfully educating 240 students with its Hindi Wibhag (up to class 8 with 8 teachers and 175 students), Bangla Wibhag (with 4 teachers and 80 students), Sanskrit Pathshala (with 2 teachers and 25 students), Tant Charakha Wibhag, and Gandhi Granthagar to advertise Gandhism in free India. Besides being the only center to spread and advertise Rashtra Bhasha Hindi in the district, the school was known for the purity and the quality of its Khadi produced as it was mandatory for every student to learn how to run charkhas and hand loom in the presence of well-trained teachers.

== Academics ==
The school provides education to almost more than 2000 boys and girls. This includes students from nearby places like Hooghly, Bandel, Chinsurah, Bansberia, Triveni, Chandannagar, Sahaganj (Dunlop), Naihati, Garifa etc.

Higher secondary is divided into Science (intake: 35) Commerce (intake: 100) and Arts (intake: more than 100).

The medium of teaching is mainly Hindi except the classes of 11 and 12 science which are taught in English due to unavailability of books and other contents in Hindi covering the syllabus of science of the West Bengal Council of Higher Secondary Education. Interested students are taught Urdu in separate classes when other students are having their Hindi periods.

== Location ==
The school is at Chawk Bazar (22°54'41"N 88°23'50"E; a famous fish market in Hooghly District) behind the Hooghly Sub Post office. It falls on the course of Bandel - Chinsurah roadway through Bali More.

== See also ==
- Education in India
- List of schools in India
- Education in West Bengal
