= Caesar School =

School in West Bengal, India

Information
- Established: 1973

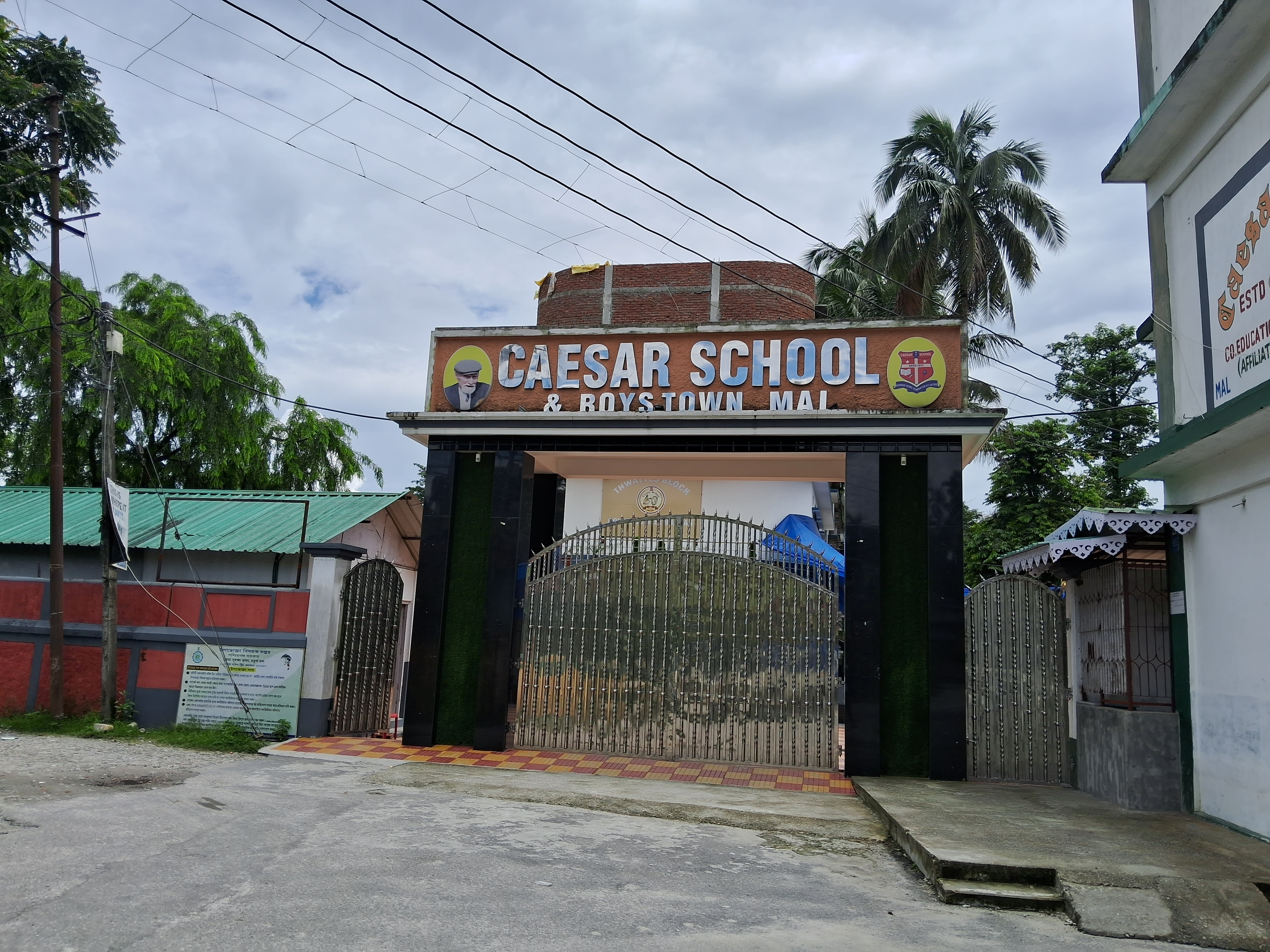
Entrance to Caesar School

Established in 1973, Caesar School is an English medium school in the town of Malbazar, India. It is affiliated to the Central Board of Secondary Education (CBSE). It is under the Bhubaneswar jurisdiction of CBSE. The School has a Student strength of approximately 1800.

== Origin ==
Late Rev. John R. Thwaytes was on a tour of India when he came across the town. When he saw young kids being sent to far off places like Darjeeling, Kurseong, Kolkata for English medium studies, he decided to create the first English medium school of the region and also a hostel was built named Boys Town Hostel with beautiful environment.

== Principal ==
The Principal of the school from its foundation was Mr. Pandey till 1980. Mr. Thomas Chandy joined the school after Mr. Pandey and the school ran under his leadership till 1985. Following Mr Chandy's death Mr P. Pandit became Acting Principal. Later, Mr. P. Pandit led the school up to 2009 then came Mervyn Rodrigues from Goa for few months and then Mrs Maitreyi Nag become the principal of Caesar School in 2010. Mr. Dilip Sarkar is the present principal of the school.

== School ==
When the school first started it was only till grade 8. In 1983 it became a matric school and in 1989 it became a high school.

The school is from Nursery to grade 12. From 5th standard to 12th standard the classes are held in the buildings named Geneva Wing and Bengal Wing, also commonly referred as 'New Building'.

== Houses ==
The four houses into which the students are divided during the Annual Sports meet are red, blue, green, yellow. All forms of games are played during this time such as carrom board, table tennis, soccer, cricket, drills, running, pillow fights, etc.

== School Anthem ==
The school anthem is the "Caesar School Song" composed by Rev. John R. Thwaytes.

== Student activities ==
Academic and co-curricular activities are given equal importance at Caesar School. There are numerous clubs dealing with debates, plays, eastern and western music competitions.
