= West Bengal Board of Madrasah Education =

Education board

- পশ্চিমবঙ্গ মাদ্রাসা শিক্ষা পর্ষদ
- Abbreviation: WBBME
- Established: 1994; 32 years ago
- Type: Government Organisation
- Legal status: Active
- Headquarters: Begum Rokaiya Bhavan, 18, Haji Md. Mohsin Square, Kolkata – 700016
- President: Md. Fazle Rabbi
- Website: http://wbbme.org/

The West Bengal Board of Madrasah Education is the state government administered autonomous examining authority for affiliated and recognized madrasahs in West Bengal, India. Perhaps among the oldest post-secondary boards in India, it is the only madrasah board that is recognized by the Government of India.Though the Madrasa Board in the State was set up in 1927, it had no legal status till 1994, when an Act of the West Bengal Legislative Assembly enabled it. It is one of the parastatal organization of the Minority Affairs and Madrasah Education Department. The West Bengal Board of Madrasah Education is the West Bengal state government administered autonomous examining authority for the High Madrasah examination (or secondary madrasah level examination) of West Bengal, India. It has come into force by the West Bengal Board of Madrasah Education Act-1994.

== Concept of Madrasah Education in West Bengal ==
The Arabic word madrasa (plural: madaris) generally has two meanings: (1) in its more common literal and colloquial usage, it simply means "school"; (2) in its secondary meaning, a madrasa is an educational institution offering instruction in Islamic subjects including, but not limited to, the Quran, the sayings (hadith) of the Islamic prophet Muhammad, jurisprudence (fiqh), and law.

Historically, madrasas were distinguished as institutions of higher studies and existed in contrast to more rudimentary schools called kuttab that taught only the Quran. There are two categories of Madrasah education system in West Bengal. One is High Madrasah Education System and other one is Senior Madrasah Education System. The High Madrasah Education System is a modern education system following by Maulana Abu Nasar Md. Waheed and Senior Madrasah Education System is an upper primary label madrasah from class V to VIII.

The Senior Madrasahs running from class I to class X are called Alim Madrasahs and the Madrasahs from class I to class XII are called Fazil Madrasahs. In addition to Language, Social Science & Science subjects like Bengali / Urdu, English, Mathematics, Life Science, Physical Science, History and Geography the subjects like Arabic, Islamic Theology (Hadith, Tafsir and Fiqh) are also taught at Alim level (10th class standard). At Fazil level (12th standard) Bengali/Urdu, English, Arabic and Theology are compulsory subjects. The students are also offered the opportunities to choose two elective subjects from the following list namely. West Bengal Madrasah Education Board also conducts Senior Madrasahs’ exams. The Senior Madrasahs are 103 in number and have four stages where traditional education of religion and Arabic are given: (1) Alim stage includes ten classes, and the subjects are Arabic, Hadith, Tafir, Fight and Faraid. In order to forge a closer affinity with the secondary stage, a number of basic subjects such as Mathematics, Physical Science, Life Science, History, Geography, with mother tongue, i.e. Bengali or Urdu and English, are also added. The external examination has also been declared as equivalent to the secondary examination, and the students of this stage are thus eligible for admission to higher secondary courses in and outside of the state. (2) Next is the Fazil stage which is for 2 years, the dominant language being Arabic, with theology being the subject of study. Fazil is not recognised by the Higher Secondary Council as equivalent to higher secondary. But those candidates, who pass Fazil Examination with English as an additional subject, are considered eligible for admission to the pre-university (Arts) course of the University of Calcutta. Subsequently, the WBCHSE allowed such students to be admitted to class XI in a higher secondary school. (3) The third stage is known as Kamil and is not recognised by any University since the course is dominantly theology-oriented. (4) The last and highest stage is known as Mumtazul Muhammadin, popularly known as the P.G. course; this is also not recognised by any university. The course content is only theology. The WBBME conducts ALIM, Fazil and M.M. examinations at the end of class X, Fazil 2nd year, Kamil 2nd year and M.M. 2nd year.

== Madrasahs and Minority Institutions ==
In Indian democratic set up and constitutional safeguards respect the rights of minorities and it has been placed under Article 29 and 30 in the part- III of the Indian Constitution. In this context Muslim Community is regarded as minority Community which is entitled to enjoy the Provision of Article 29 & 30 of Part – III of the Constitution. Article "29. (1) Any section of the citizens residing in the territory of India or any part thereof having a distinct language, script or culture of its own shall have the right to conserve the same. (2) No citizen shall be denied admission into any educational institution maintained by the State or receiving aid out of State funds on grounds only of religion, race, caste, language or any of them." Article "30. (1) All minorities, whether based on religion or language, shall have the right to establish and administer educational institutions of their choice. 1[(1A) In making any law providing for the compulsory acquisition of any property of an educational institution established and administered by a minority. referred to in clause (1), the State shall ensure that the amount fixed by or determined under such law for the acquisition of such property is such as would not restrict or abrogate the right guaranteed under that clause.] (2) The State shall not, in granting aid to educational institutions, discriminate against any educational institution on the ground that it is under the management of a minority, whether based on religion or language."

=== Article 30 in The Constitution Of India 1949 ===
30. Right of minorities to establish and administer educational institutions

(1) All minorities, whether based on religion or language, shall have the right to establish and administer educational institutions of their choice

(1A) In making any law providing for the compulsory acquisition of any property of an educational institution established and administered by a minority, referred to in clause ( 1 ), the State shall ensure that the amount fixed by or determined under such law for the acquisition of such property is such as would not restrict or abrogate the right guaranteed under that clause

(2) The state shall not, in granting aid to educational institutions, discriminate against any educational institution on the ground that it is under the management of a minority, whether based on religion or language.

== Composition of the Madrasah Board ==
The Board shall consist of the following members: -

(a) the President;

(b) the President of the West Bengal Council of Higher Secondary Education, ex officio;

(c) the President of the West Bengal Board of Secondary Education, ex officio;

(d) the President of the West Bengal Board of Primary Education, ex officio;

[(e) the Director of Madrasah Education, West Bengal, ex officio]

(f) the Head of the Department of Arabic, Calcutta University, ex-officio;

(g) the representative of Vice-Chancellor Allah University, ex officio;]

(h) two heads of recognized Madrasahs—one High Madrasah and one Senior Madrasah—nominated by the State Government;

(i) two Members of the West Bengal Legislative Assembly nominated by the State Government;

(j) three persons nominated by the State Government of whom -

(i) one shall be a whole time member of the teaching staff of a college imparting instruction in Arabic or Persian language and affiliated to any University in West Bengal,

(ii) one shall be an expert in Islamic Culture and Theology, and

(iii) one shall be a woman interested in Madrasah Education;

(k) [eleven] whole time and permanent members of the teaching staff of recognized Madrasahs—five from High Madrasahs, three from Senior Madrasahs and two from Junior High Madrasahs [and one from Primary Madrasah] — elected in the manner prescribed;

(l) two persons from the whole time and permanent non teaching staff of recognized Madrasahs elected in the manner prescribed;

(m) one person from the whole time and permanent staff of the Board elected in the manner prescribed.

== Contradictions ==
Contradictions arise whether madrasahs are purely secular institutions or not, as per the government website of West Bengal Madrasah Service Commission "the term 'Madrasah' is an Arabic word meaning educational institution or school imparting education to all irrespective of religion, caste, creed and gender. The idea that it imparts religious and theology based education to a particular religion is not true." Madrasah service commission thoroughly rejects the idea of religious education, whereas the West Bengal Board of Madrasah Education Act 1994, published in Calcutta Gazette, 1994, passed by the West Bengal Legislature, extends to the whole of West Bengal, "Madrasah Education" means a system of education in which instruction is imparted in Arabic. Islamic history and culture, and theology". As per the CPI(M) led government of West Bengal concluded Islamic studies and Islamic theology based education can be imparted at the government expenses and they do not belong to religious education, without any clarification.

=== Article 28 in The Constitution Of India 1949 ===
28. Freedom as to attendance at religious instruction or religious worship in certain educational institutions

(1) No religion instruction shall be provided in any educational institution wholly maintained out of State funds

(2) Nothing in clause ( 1 ) shall apply to an educational institution which is administered by the State but has been established under any endowment or trust which requires that religious instruction shall be imparted in such institution

(3) No person attending any educational institution recognized by the State or receiving aid out of State funds shall be required to take part in any religious instruction that may be imparted in such institution or to attend any religious worship that may be conducted in such institution or in any premises attached thereto unless such person or, if such person is a minor, his guardian has given his consent thereto Cultural and Educational Rights.

=== Elected Management Vs. West Bengal Madrasah Service Commission ===
Another case of contradiction arises on who would govern the madrasahs in West Bengal. As per the Article 30 of Indian constitution, if madrasahs are minority institutions then it has to be managed all affairs by the managing committee, including appointing of teachers. The writ petitioners who approached the learned trial Judge challenged the enactment of the West Bengal Madrasah Service Commission Act, 2008 (hereinafter referred to as the Act). It is not in dispute the writ petitioners’ status as minority institutions and on the other hand there was a declaration to that effect. The writ petitioners’ contentions before the learned Single Judge were nothing but taking away the rights of the minority groups guaranteed by the Constitution of India. In other words, such legislation and/or restriction imposed by the said Act in question was an inroad into the fundamental rights of the minority institutions guaranteed by the Constitution. The stand of the State was that since the Madrasahs are fully aided so far as the finance is concerned, therefore, the State Government has power to interfere with the selection process of the teachers to be appointed in such Madrasahs. The other ground of defence was since the selection committee merely makes recommendation to the Managing Committee for appointment, therefore, overall control remained with the Managing Committee, therefore, there is no interference of the Government in the affairs of the Madrasahs. In other words, they tried to impress upon the learned Single Judge that role of the commission is mere recommendatory in nature and nothing else. They also contended that in order to achieve implementation of quality education, such enactment was necessary and therefore, the writ petitioners could not have challenged such genuine policy of the State.

== See also ==
- School Education Department, West Bengal
- West Bengal Board of Secondary Education
- West Bengal Council of Higher Secondary Education
