= Aditya Academy (Secondary) =

Private school in West Bengal, India

- Kadambagachi, Barasat, Kolkata, North 24 Parganas; West Bengal - 700125

Information
- School type: Private
- Motto: Serve The Humanity
- Established: 2003
- Founder: Bhaskar Aditya
- School board: CBSE
- Chairman: Anirban Aditya
- Principal: Sumana Saha
- Classes: Pre KG to Std. 12
- Website: www.adityaacademysecondary.com

Aditya Academy (Secondary) is a CBSE co-educational English medium school with boarding facilities. It was founded in 2003 by Bhaskar Aditya and is situated in Kadambagachi, Barasat, West Bengal. It is owned by Bhaskar Aditya Group.

== Events ==
During a special event in 2018, Diego Maradona and Sourav Ganguly visited to play a football match 'Diego Vs Dada'. It was played in the ASOS stadium.
