= Bagnan =

- Census Town
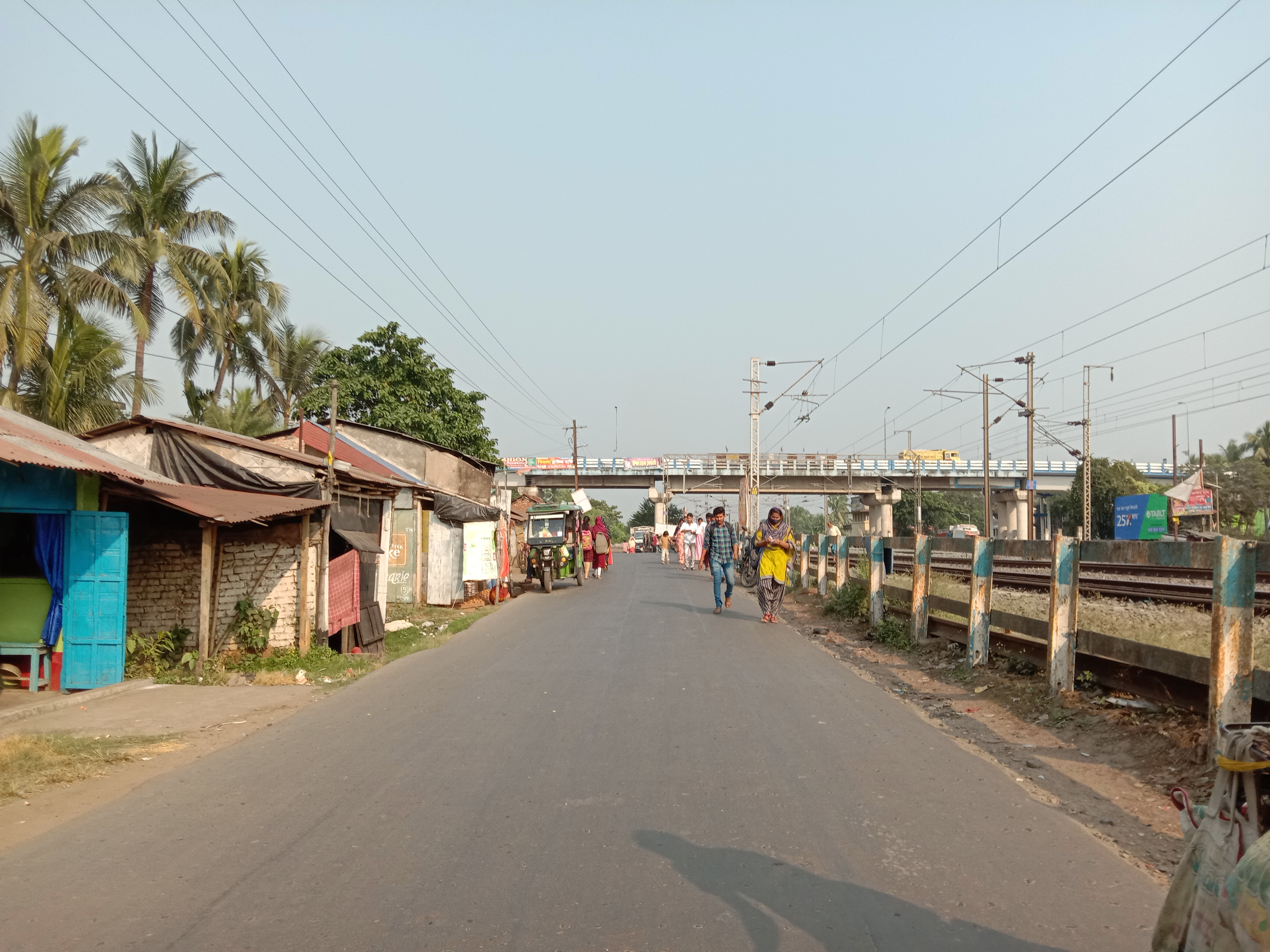
- Bagnan Railway Station road

- Location in West Bengal, India Bagnan (India)
- Coordinates: 22.47°N 87.97°E
- Country: India
- State: West Bengal
- District: Howrah
- Elevation: 6 m (20 ft)

Population (2011)
  - Total: 10,996

Languages
  - Official: Bengali, English
- Time zone: UTC+5:30 (IST)
- PIN: 711303
- ISO 3166 code: IN-WB
- Vehicle registration: WB
- Lok Sabha constituency: Uluberia
- Vidhan Sabha constituency: Bagnan
- Website: howrah.gov.in

Bagnan is a census town in Bagnan I CD Block of Uluberia subdivision in Howrah district in the state of West Bengal, India.

== Geography ==
Bagnan is located at 22.47°N 87.97°E. It has an average elevation of 6 metres (19 feet). It is situated between two rivers, the Damodar and the Rupnarayan.

== Demographics ==
As per 2011 Census of India Bagnan had a total population of 10,996 of which 5,536 (50%) were males and 5,460 (50%) were females. Population below 6 years was 1,226. The total number of literates in Bagnan was 8,388 (85.85% of the population over 6 years).

As of 2001 India census, Bagnan had a population of 8,779. Males constitute 51% of the population and females 49%. Bagnan has an average literacy rate of 68%, higher than the national average of 59.5%; with 55% of the males and 45% of females literate. 12% of the population is under 6 years of age.

== Education ==
=== High schools ===
- Bagnan High School; established in 1854
- St. Xavier's Public School
- Don Bosco School, Bagnan Branch
- Bagnan Adarsha Balika Vidyalaya; girls school, established in 1938
- Santoshpur Gauranga Vidyapith, established in 1957.
- Mugkalyan High School; in Mugkalyan, established 1866.
- Benapur Chandanapara High School(H.S)
- Bantul Mahakali High School; established at 1916.
- Chandravag Srikrishna Girl's High School
- Bagnan Girls' High School
- Tenpur Nabasan Anantaram High School
- Nabasan High School
- Khalore Gopimohan Shikshayataan
- Kalyanpur High School (H.S.)
- Bangalpur U. C High SCHOOL (H. S.)
- B.N.S. High School, established at 1954
- Bangalpur Jyotirmoyee Girls' High School
- Deulgram Mankur Bakshi High school
- Maulana Azad Academy
- Kashmoli Nigna S.C High School

=== Pre-Primary/KG School ===
- Bagnan Primary School (Govt), O.T road, near Telephone Exchange
- Khalore Kali bari Primary School(Govt), Beside Khalore Maa Kali Temple.
- Kishalaya Kindergarten Primary School
- St. Thomas school(Pvt), near Registry Office, Bagnan
- Notobor memorial Kindergarten School (Pvt.), Chandrapur
- Children's academy(Pvt), near Block Agri office
- Swami Vivekananda School(Pvt), Khalore
- Path Bhawan(Pvt), near Khalore Maa Kali Temple.
- Little Millennium Pre primary(Pvt) - Near Bagnan-II BD Office, Kolapara Kamarshal.
- Chandanapara Children's Academy(Pvt)
- Sisutirtha Siksha Niketan, Near Khadinan More

Kashmoli purba para primary school- Near amta-II BD OFFICE and police station

=== Colleges/Universities ===
There is no University located in Bagnan but there is a college.

- Bagnan College is affiliated to University of Calcutta. The college was founded in July 1958 with only arts faculty. In 1966 the faculty of commerce and in 1974 the faculty of science faculty was added. The college is accredited by the NAAC with B-grade since 2005.

== Culture ==
Khalore Kali Bari Mandir in Bagnan, Howrah is one of the famous Hindu Temples in Khalore, Bagnan, Howrah, where people from all over Howrah come to worship the Goddess KALI.

Porar Kali puja is hosted in the village province of Gopalpur.

=== Deulti ===
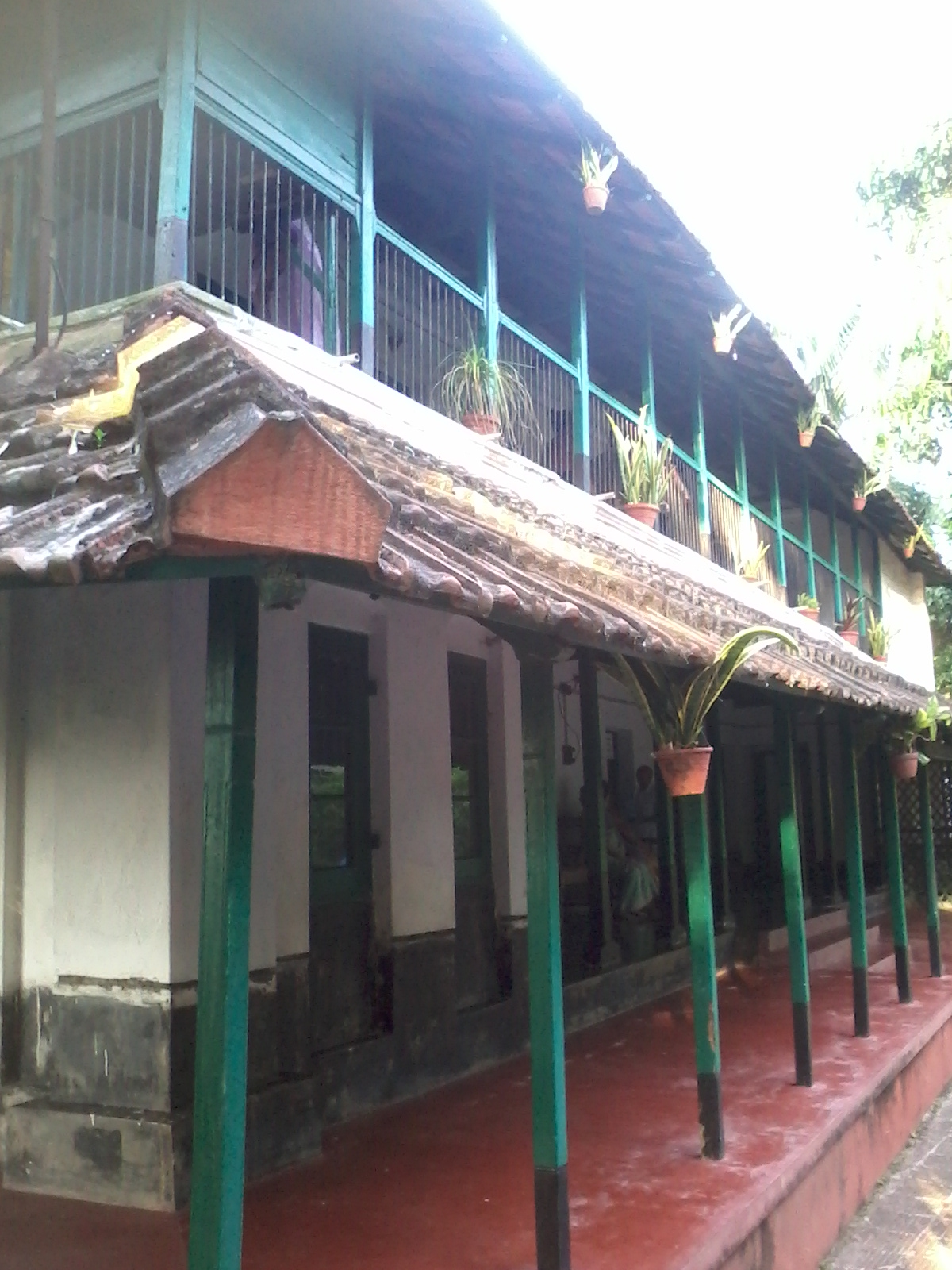
Sarat Chandra Chattopadhyay's house

Deulti is located on the banks of the river Rupnarayan. This place is a tourist destination. Its distance from Kolkata is 50 kilometers. The immortal storyteller Sarat Chandra Chattopadhyay's house is there. This is also the reason for the attraction.

== The railway station ==
One of the key features of Bagnan is its railway station. It is by far one of the busiest railway station in South Eastern Railway Zone within West Bengal due to its connectivity to other major places Station code : BZN No. of Platforms : 5 (North to south)
