= Alamohan Das =

Indian industrialist, businessman and politician from Howrah

Alamohan Dass
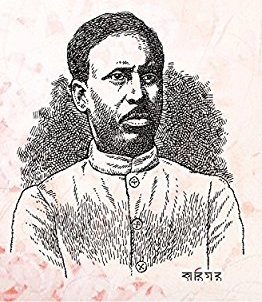
- Born: Surendra Mohan Das; March 1895; Khila-Dey Para, Howrah, Bengal, British India (now Howrah District, West Bengal, India)
- Died: 30 December 1969 (aged 74)
- Occupations: Industrialist, Politician
- Known for: India Machinery Company; Bharat Jute Mill; Arati Cotton Mill; Dass Bank
- Title: Karam Vir

Alamohan Das was an industrialist in pre-independence and post-independence Bengal. He ventured into various industries like jute, cotton, heavy machinery, drug, and banking. He is known for his role in the India Machinery Company, one of the earliest indigenous machine making industries of India.

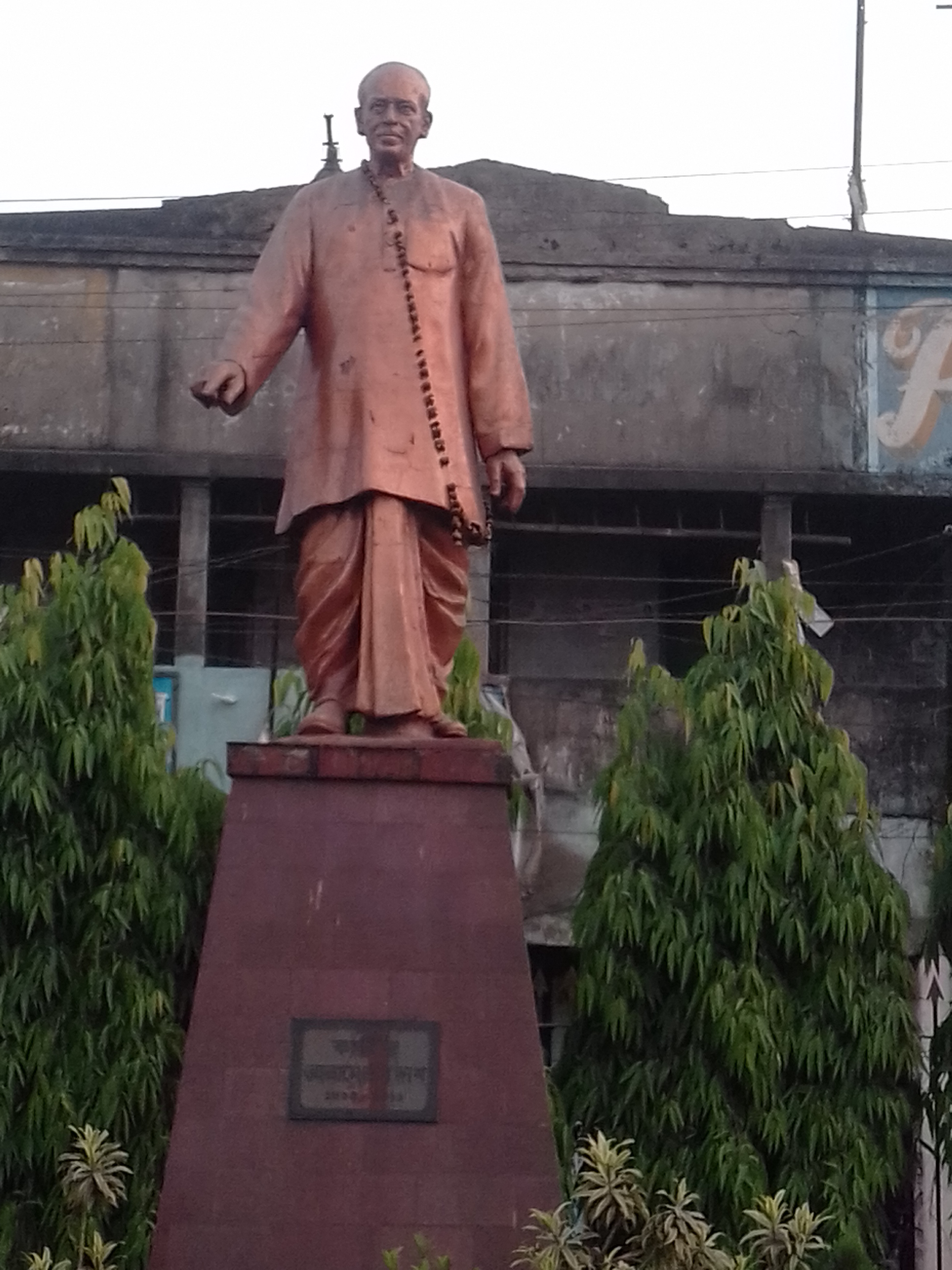
Statue of Alamohan Das at Dasnagar

== Early life ==
Alamohan Das was born in a middle-class Mahishya family in Khila-Baruipur, Howrah district of West Bengal, India. He had little formal education as a child, except attending a village pathshala and a middle primary school. But as he hailed from a business minded Mahishya family, he came to Kolkata at the age of 15 and started his business career by selling parched rice, small things, but gradually switched over to industrial items. He started to read avidly to acquire knowledge for his betterment and fulfilling his ambitions. He was very much influenced by Bankim Chandra's Anandamath and Tagore's 'Banglar Mati Banglar Jwal'. He took the spirit of Swadeshi movement in his heart.

== India Machinery Co. ==
In 1930, he founded the India Machinery Co., which, according to Government reports, was one of the few companies that produced machines of grade 1 category. Amongst the products of the company were lathes, weighing machines, textile manufacturing machines, and printing machines. In 1937, he started Bharat Jute Mill.

== Political career ==
In independent India's first election in 1951, he won from the Amta North assembly constituency in the West Bengal state assembly, contesting as an independent candidate.

== Works ==
- Howrah Chemical Works
- Bengal Weighing Scales Co.(1921)
- Paul Engineering Works (1934)
- Bharat Jute Mills (1937), inaugurated by Acharya Prafulla Chandra Ray
- Dasnagar (1937), Dass's namesake industrial town
- India Machinery Co. (1940)
- Dass Bank Ltd. (1940)
- Howrah Insurance Co. Ltd. (1941)
- Asia Drug Co. Ltd. (1942)
- Dass Sugar Corporation (1942)
- The Great India Steam Navigation Co. Ltd. (1945)
- Arati Cotton Mills (1948)

== Gallery ==
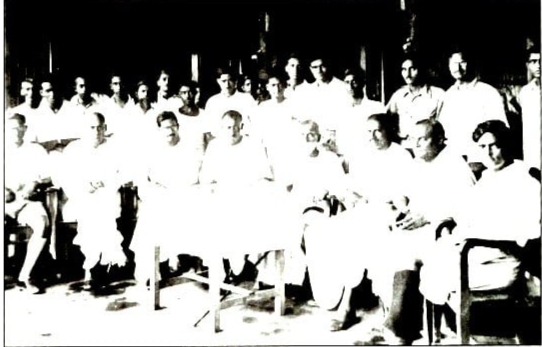
Karmavir Alamohan Dass with Acharya Prafulla Chandra Ray and management of India Machinery Co.

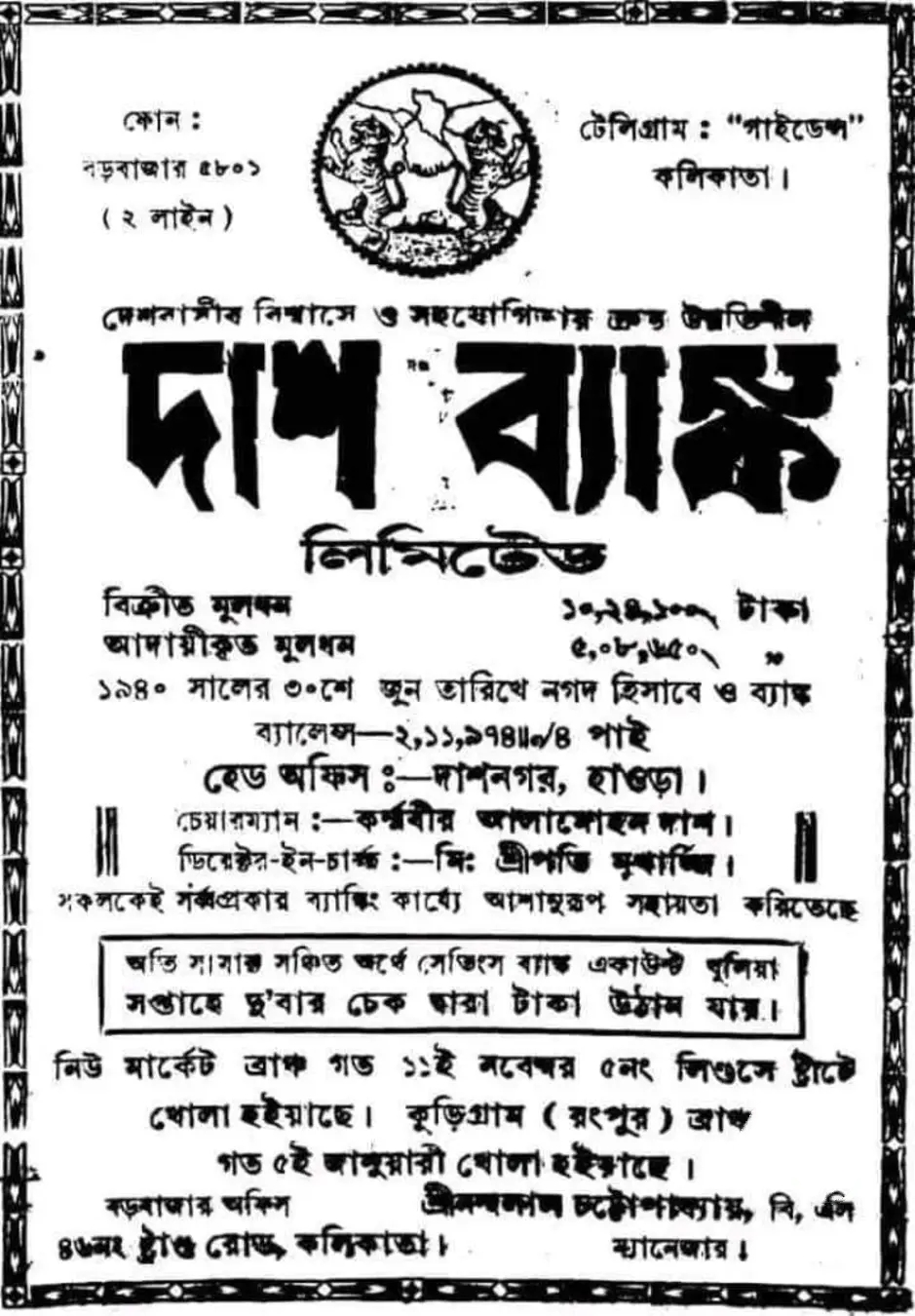
Alamohan Dass founded Dass founded Dass Bank Ltd. Despite initial success he was forced to close it due to unfavourable political condition before Partition of India

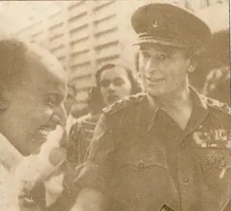
Karmavir Alamohan Dass with Lady and Lord Mountbatten, last Viceroy of India

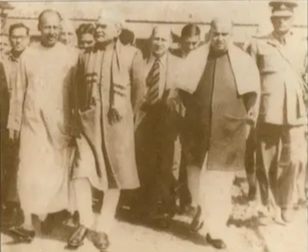
Alamohan Dass with then West Bengal Governor Kailash Nath Katju and Dr. Syama Prasad Mukherjee, then Union Minister of Commerce and Industry. Dr. Mukherjee inaugurated Dass's Arati Cotton Mills in 1948

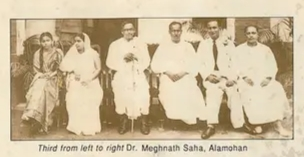
Alamohan Dass with Dr. Meghnad Saha, when he visited Dass in Dassnagar

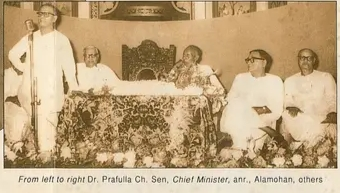
Alamohan Dass sharing stage with then Chief Minister Prafulla Chandra Sen

== See also ==
- Dasnagar railway station
- Khila Gopimohan Siksha Sadan
