= Krishnabhabini Das =

Bengali author and social activist

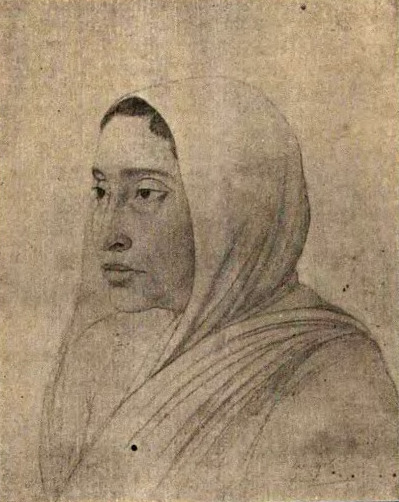
- Born: 1862; Murshidabad district, British India (Present day in West Bengal, India)
- Died: 1919 (aged 56–57)
- Occupation: Writer

Krishnabhabini Das (1862–1919) was a Bengali writer and a feminist.

== Early life ==
Krishnabhabini was born circa 1862 in Murshidabad, Bengal Presidency, British Raj. She was educated at home. She married Devendranath Das when she was nine. Her husband moved to England in 1876 to attempt the Indian Civil Service examinations. He was not successful. After that he went to the University of Cambridge to study mathematics. In 1882 he returned to Kolkata to his wife. They left for England together after six months when she was 18.

== Career ==
Krishnabhabini liked British Culture and its people and was greatly influenced by it. She was really impressed by the status enjoyed by Women in Britain. In 1885 she published a book about her experience in England, Ingland Banga Mahila (a Bengali woman in England). She was worried about the social views of a woman writing a book so she published it anonymously. In the book she criticised the status of women in Bengali society and praised their status in British Society. She wrote about the freedom enjoyed by British women, their education and employment opportunities. She criticised the treatment of lower classes in Britain and what she viewed was the British society's obsession with money and self-interest. She also introduced the concept of women's rights and feminism to the Bengali readers. She returned to Kolkata in 1889. She continued to write about women's rights and the need for female education. She wrote in magazines Bharati, Prabasi, and the Sadhana. She built a women's shelter for widows.

== Death ==
Krishnabhabini died in 1919.
