= Rolf Schoembs Vidyashram =

Coordinates: 23.712°N 87.655°E

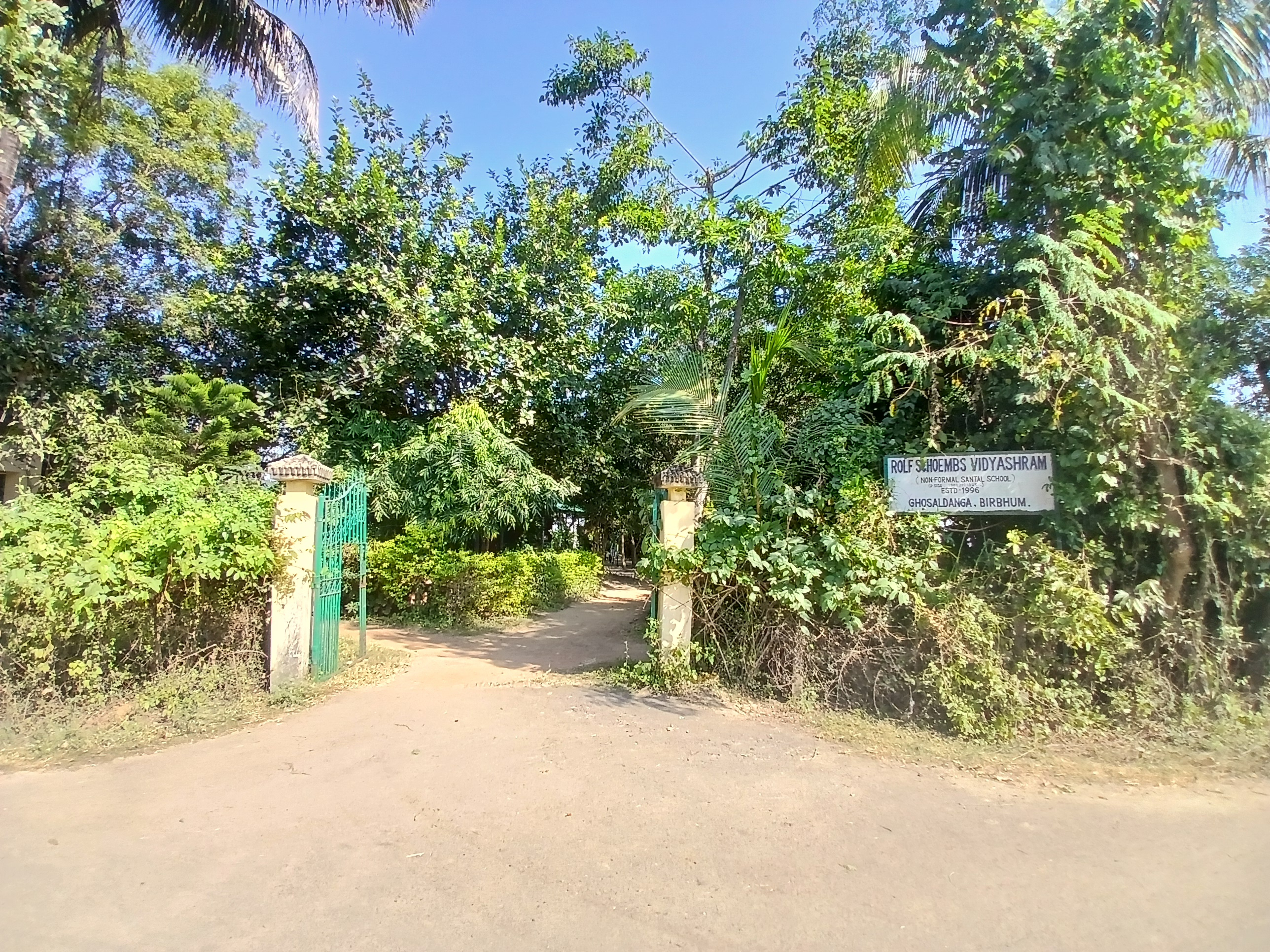
- Rolf Schoembs Vidyashram (RSV)
- Ghosaldanga, Bolpur-Sriniketan, Birbhum district, West Bengal, India; India

Information
- Type: Primary / non-formal school
- Established: 1996
- Founder: Ghosaldanga Bishnubati Adibasi Seva Sangha
- Grades: Primary level
- Gender: Coeducational
- Language: Santali, Bengali, English

Rolf Schoembs Vidyashram (commonly known as RSV) is a non-formal primary school located in Ghosaldanga, near Bishnubati village in the Bolpur-Sriniketan area of Birbhum district, West Bengal, India. It was founded in 1996 by the Ghosaldanga Bishnubati Adibasi Seva Sangha with financial support from Rolf Schoembs, a German friend of the Santal community. The school was established to provide culturally relevant education for Santal children and to promote learning through their mother tongue, Santali.

== History ==
Before RSV was founded, local volunteers had started informal education programs for Santal children who often struggled in Bengali-medium government schools. In 1996, with help from German donors and local teachers, these initiatives grew into a full primary school named after Rolf Schoembs, who supported the project financially and morally.

== Education and campus ==
The educational philosophy of Rolf Schoembs Vidyashram emphasizes mother-tongue instruction, community involvement, and respect for Santal culture. Classes are taught primarily in Santali, while Bengali and English are introduced gradually to build multilingual competence. The curriculum integrates traditional Santal songs, folk stories, and local history alongside basic subjects such as mathematics, science, and environmental studies.

The school’s campus is set in a rural landscape surrounded by trees and open fields, encouraging outdoor learning and close connection to nature. The classrooms are simple, built with local materials such as clay, bamboo, and tiles, and designed to create a warm, familiar atmosphere for children. Besides regular lessons, students participate in gardening, art, and cultural festivals that strengthen their sense of identity and belonging. Teachers are recruited mostly from nearby villages, ensuring that students are guided by educators who understand their language and social background.

== Community involvement ==
Rolf Schoembs Vidyashram is closely linked to local social development initiatives like the Ghosaldanga Bishnubati Adibasi Trust, which runs health and livelihood projects in the same villages. Together, they aim to strengthen indigenous education, reduce dropout rates, and empower the Santal community. The school has also been cited in development reports and educational journals as a successful model for integrating traditional knowledge with modern education in India.

== Legacy ==
Over the years, RSV has become a model for tribal education in West Bengal. Its success has inspired similar projects in nearby villages and has attracted visitors from India and abroad who are interested in community-based education and preservation of indigenous languages. The school continues to receive support from local and international partners committed to promoting sustainable education for tribal children.

== See also ==
- Santali language
- Education in West Bengal
- Adivasi
