= Islampur, Uttar Dinajpur =

Islampur
- City
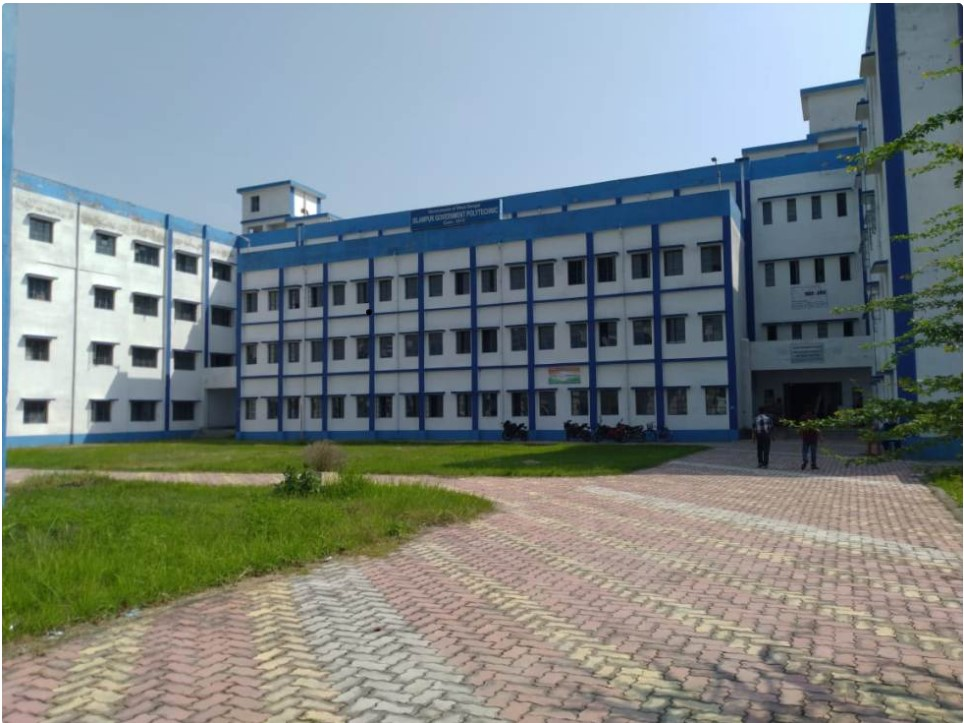
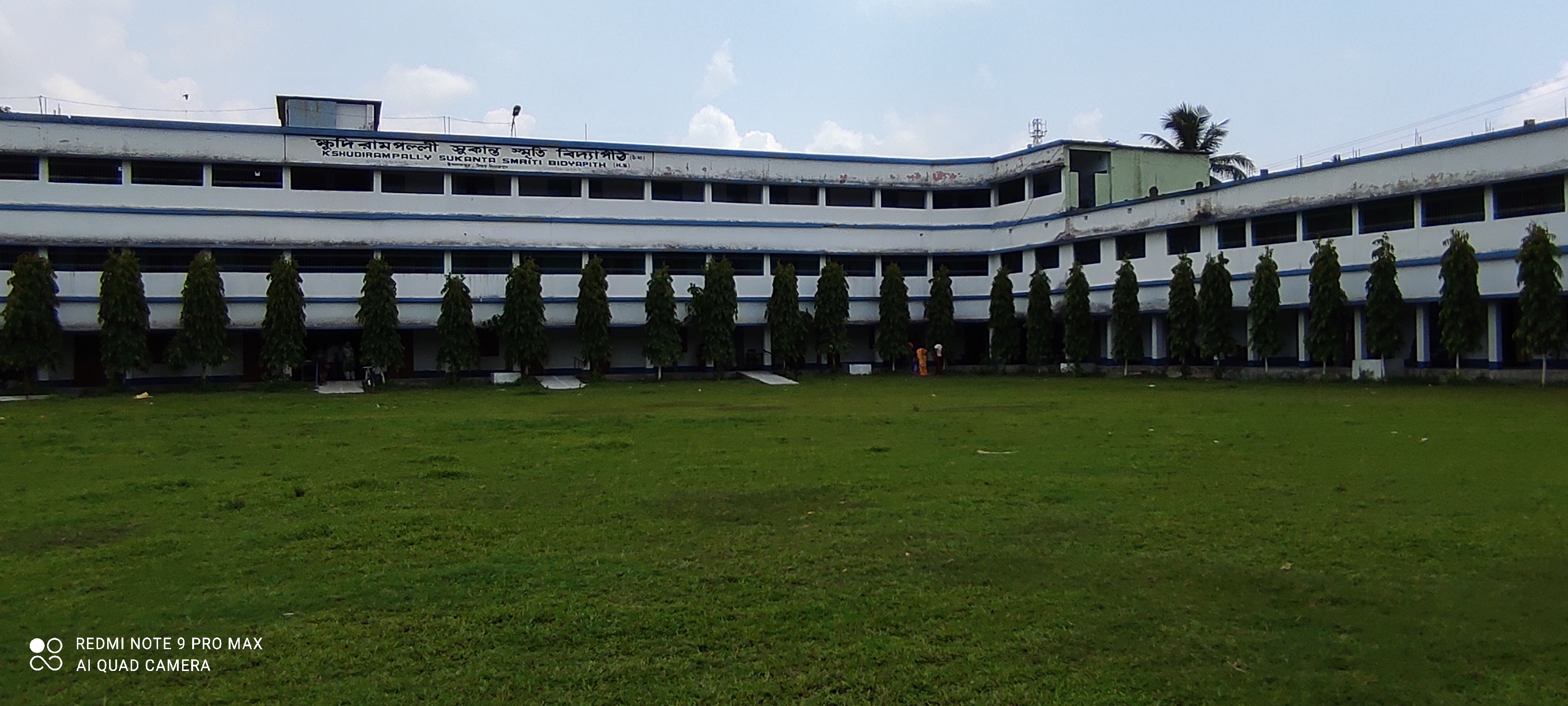
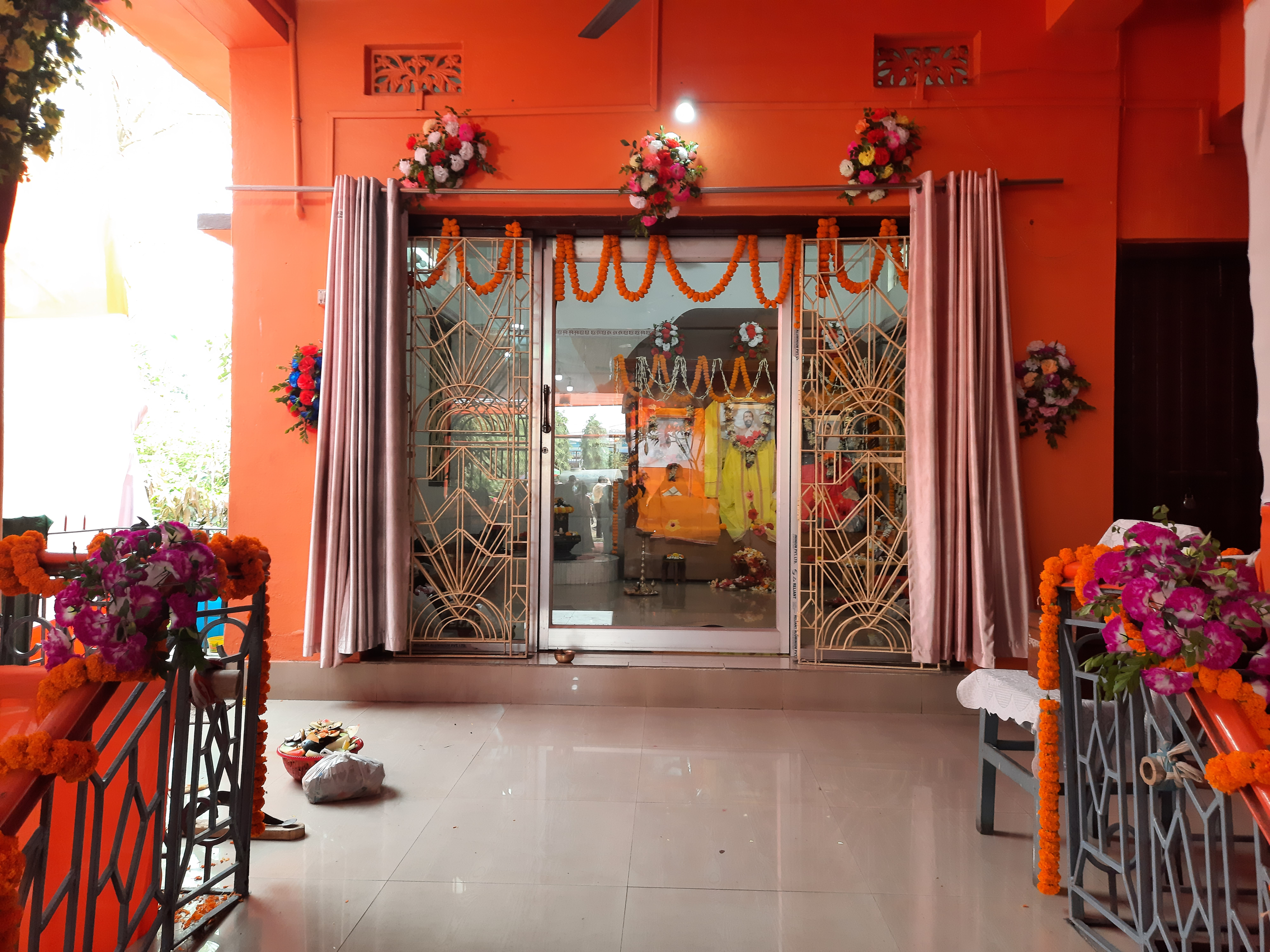
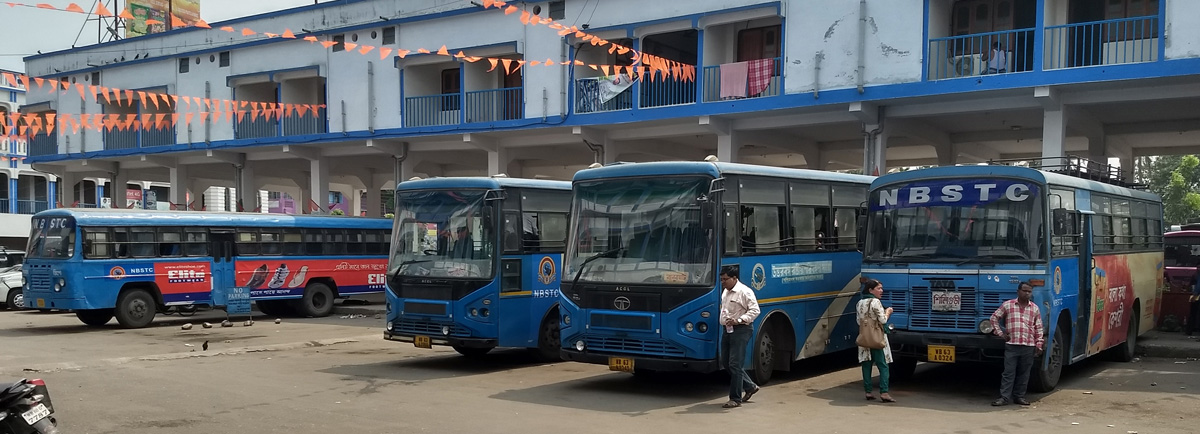
- From top, left to right: the polytechnic, a school, Hindu temple, bus terminus

- Location in West Bengal, Indian Islampur (India)
- Coordinates: 26.26°N 88.18°E
- Country: India
- State: West Bengal
- District: Uttar Dinajpur

Government
  - Type: Municipality

Area
  - Total: 11.40 km^{2} (4.40 sq mi)
- Elevation: 53 m (174 ft)

Population (2011)
  - Total: 54,340
  - Density: 4,767/km^{2} (12,350/sq mi)
  - Male: 28,227 (52%)
  - Female: 26,113 (48%)

Languages
  - Official: Bengali, English, Hindi
- Time zone: UTC+5:30 (IST)
- PIN: 733202
- Telephone code: 03526
- Vehicle registration: WB-91/WB-92
- Lok Sabha constituency: Raiganj
- Vidhan Sabha constituency: Islampur
- Website: uttardinajpur.nic.in www.islampurmunicipality.org

Islampur is a town and a municipality in Uttar Dinajpur district in the Indian state of West Bengal. It is the headquarters of the Islampur subdivision.

== History ==
A portion of the erstwhile Kishanganj subdivision comprising Goalpokhar, Islampur and Chopra thanas (police stations) and parts of Thakurganj thana, along with the adjacent parts of the erstwhile Gopalpur thana in Katihar subdivision were transferred from Purnea district in Bihar to West Bengal in 1956, and were formally incorporated into Raiganj subdivision in West Dinajpur district. On 21 March 1959, Islampur subdivision was inaugurated by Dr. Bidhan Chandra Roy, Chief Minister of West Bengal, at the newly constructed administrative building of the S.D.O., Islampur.

== Geography ==
Cities and towns in the Uttar Dinajpur district
M: municipal city/ town, CT: census town, R: rural/ urban centre, T: tourist centre
Owing to space constraints in the small map, the actual locations in a larger map may vary slightly

=== Police station ===
Islampur police station under West Bengal police has jurisdiction over Islampur municipal area and Islampur community development (CD) block. It is 110 km from the district headquarters and covers an area of 331.20 km^{2}. Islampur Town Out Post and Ramganj Out Post are functioning under this PS.

=== CD block HQ ===
The headquarters of Islampur CD block is at Islampur town.

In the map alongside, all places marked on the map are linked in the full screen version.

== Official language ==
As per the West Bengal Official Language (Amendment) Act, 2012, which came into force from December 2012, Urdu was given the status of official language in areas, such as subdivisions and blocks, having more than 10% Urdu speaking population. In Uttar Dinajpur district, Goalpokhar I and II blocks, Islampur block and Islampur municipality were identified as fulfilling the norms set In 2014, Calcutta High Court, in an order, included Dalkhola municipality in the list.

== Demographics ==
As per the 2011 Census of India, Islampur had a total population of 54,340, of which 28,227 (52%) were males and 26,113 (48%) were females. Population below 6 years was 6,852. The total number of literates in Islampur was 38,540 (80.70% of the population over 6 years).

As of 2001 India census, Islampur had a population of 52,766. Males constitute 54% of the population and females 46%. Islampur has an average literacy rate of 63% (less than the national average of 74.04%): male literacy is 68%, and female literacy is 57%. In Islampur, 15% of the population is under 6 years of age.

=== Religion ===
Religious Demographic in Islampur Town (2011)
1. Hinduism (67.6%)
2. Islam (31.3%)
3. Jainism (0.44%)
4. Christianity (0.40%)
5. Others (0.23%)

=== Languages ===
Languages spoken in Islampur Town (2011)
1. Bengali (65.5%)
2. Hindi (18.4%)
3. Urdu (8.91%)
4. Surjapuri (5.34%)
5. Santali (0.72%)
6. Others (0.72%)

== Transport ==
Aluabari Road Junction railway station on the Howrah–New Jalpaiguri line and Barauni-Guwahati line serves Islampur.

National Highway 27 passes through Islampur town.

== Education ==
Islampur College was established in 1973. Affiliated to the University of North Bengal, it offers honours courses in Bengali, English, Urdu, political science, history, philosophy, geography, mathematics and accountancy, and general courses in arts, science and commerce. It has separate hostel facilities for boys and girls. Islampur Government Polytechnic is a polytechnic affiliated to the West Bengal State Council of Technical Education.

Islampur High School is a boys only Bengali-medium higher secondary school. Established in 1958, it has facilities for teaching from class VI to XII. Housed in a government building, it has 25 computers, a library and a playground.

Islampur Girls High School is a girls only Bengali-medium higher secondary school. Established in 1964, it has facilities for teaching from class VI to XII. Housed in a government building, it has 22 computers, a library and a playground.

== Healthcare ==
Islampur subdivisional hospital (with 136 beds) is a major medical facility at Islampur.
