= West Bengal Council of Higher Secondary Education =

Government education examination organization

- Abbreviation: WBCHSE
- Established: 3 April 1975; 51 years ago
- Type: Government School Education Board
- Headquarters: Vidyasagar Bhavan, Salt Lake, Kolkata – 700 091
- President: Dr Asit Kumar Mandal
- Secretary: Dr Subhajit Dhar
- Parent organization: Government of West Bengal
- Affiliations: Department of School Education, Gov. of West Bengal
- Website: wbchse.wb.gov.in

The West Bengal Council of Higher Secondary Education (WBCHSE) is an Indian examining authority (School Educational Board), which is responsible for conducting examinations for standard XII for both government and private schools affiliated to this board. The exam is commonly known as Uccha Madhyamik Pariksha or Higher Secondary Exam (HS). It came into existence in 1975. It is responsible for improvement and promotion of education in the state. WBCHSE conducts the West Bengal Higher Secondary Examinations (Class 12) each year, for which more than 8 Lakh students appear across the state.

First Higher Secondary examination was conducted by WBCHSE in 1978. Till then, its equivalent exam (known as 'Intermediate' degree) was conducted by University of Calcutta.

== Examination system ==
In the initial years, students had to write answers to essay type questions and long answer type questions. Later, this was considered as 'stressful', 'unscientific' and 'injustice' to students as some single questions used to carry 16 marks and five such questions had to be answered in some subjects. There remained chances of non-uniform evaluation of different students' answer by different examiners. Short answer type questions were introduced eventually.

Exams of each subject consisted of two papers. Paper 1 focussed on topics of class XI and Paper 2 of class XII mainly. The then existant system of holding the HS exam on the basis of a combined syllabi of both the classes was decided to be replaced by evaluation based on only class 12 from the 2007 HS exam. Thereafter, the two-paper system had been done away with. Since then, WBCHSE had been preparing question paper for Annual Exam at the end of class XI and the HS exam at the end of class XII. Schools were directed to conduct a 'Test Examination' mandatorily at the end of class 12 for qualifying to write in the HS exam. Many schools used to conduct half-yearly exams internally for class XI and XII in the middle of each session.

In 2024, as per Council's direction, schools individually conducted the Annual Exam of class XI strictly following the question structure of the council. The HS exam of 2025 was the last regular one conducted by WBCHSE in Annual system.

Replacing the age-old Annual system, WBCHSE introduced a four phase semester system from the academic year 2024–25, first in India in Higher secondary level. It consists of two semesters for class XI (Sem-1 and Sem-2) and next two semesters for class XII (Sem-3 and Sem-4). Sem-1 and 3 are MCQ based and Sem-2 and 4 exams have descriptive questions. Semesters 1 and 2 make up the class XI curriculum whereas 3 and 4 for class XII.

In accordance with the State Education Policy of Government of West Bengal, the erstwhile 'HS exam' or 12th board exam is now effectively split into Semester 3 and Semester 4 exams. Students will appear in the HS exam under this system in 2026 for the first time.

== Major changes ==
Since its inception in 1975, the syllabi, course structure, curricula and subjects offered were changed several times. The first major syllabus change was done in 2005 and later in 2013. The latest change in subject combination, syllabi and exam structure was done in 2024–25.

== See also ==
- West Bengal Board of Secondary Education
- School Education Department, West Bengal
- West Bengal Board of Madrasah Education
- West Bengal Council of Rabindra Open Schooling
