= Ramakrishna Mission Shikshanamandira =

Post-graduate college and research institute in West Bengal, India

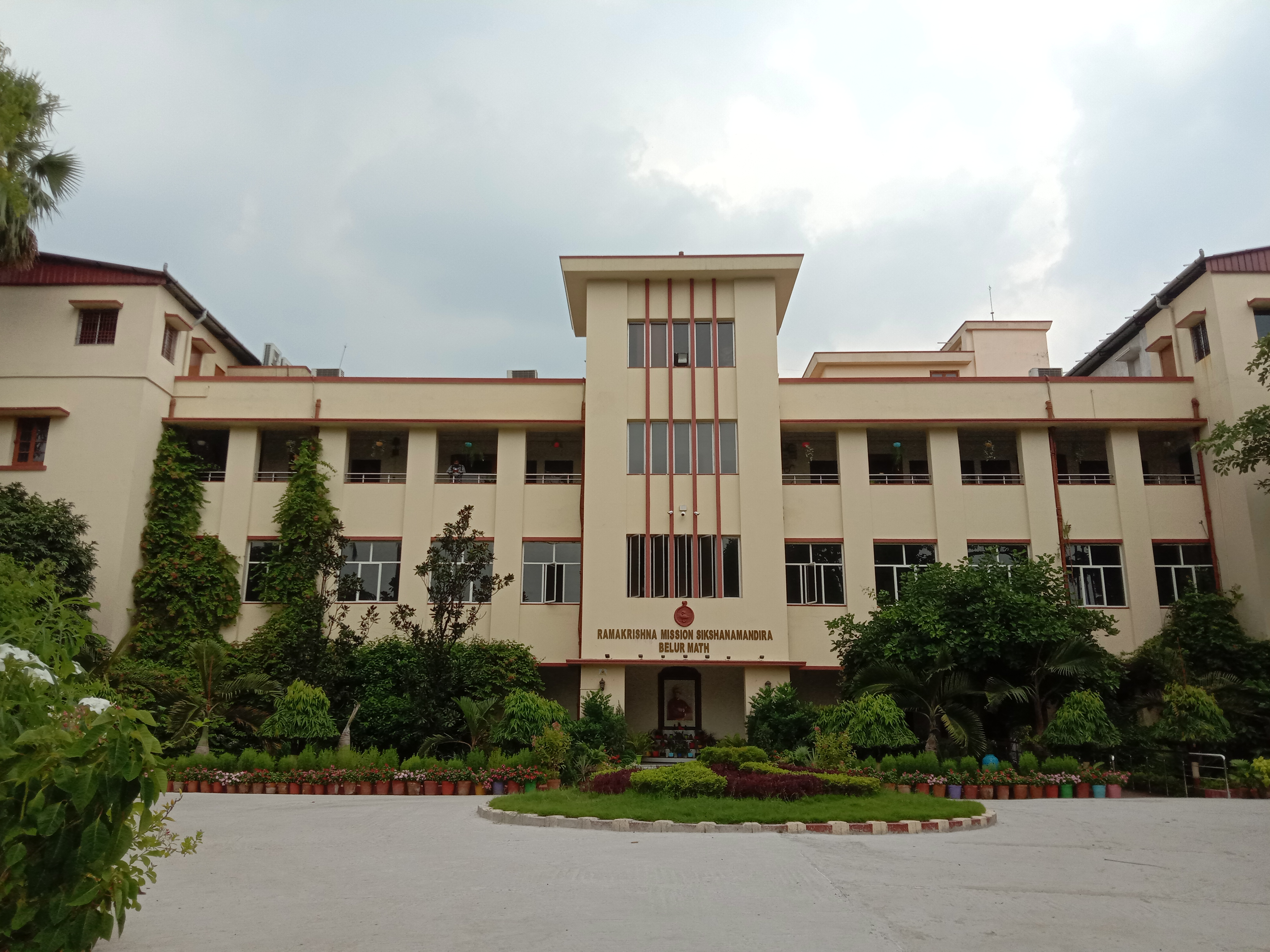
- Front view of the RKMSM building
- Other name: RKMSM
- Motto: Service to the man is service to the God
- Type: Teacher-training college; Government aided degree college; Research institute
- Established: 12 January 1958; 68 years ago
- Founder: Swami Visuddhanandaji
- Accreditation: National Assessment and Accreditation Council; University Grants Commission
- Religious affiliation: Ramakrishna Mission
- Academic affiliations: University of Calcutta
- Principal: Swami Vidyamritananda
- Location: Belur, West Bengal, India; 22.6317°N 88.3542°E
- Campus: Urban
- Journal: Sikshachintan
- Colors: Cyan
- Website: rkmsm.org
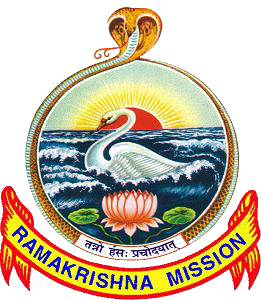

- Location in Kolkata Location in India

Ramakrishna Mission Shikshanamandira (abbreviated as RKMSM) is an autonomous post-graduate degree college and research institute located in Belur, Howrah, West Bengal, near Belur Math, in the Indian state of West Bengal. Established in 1958 by Swami Vimuktanandaji Maharaj (one of the architects for actualising the educational vision envisaged by Swami Vivekananda) as a residential teachers' training college for male students aided by the Government of West Bengal and affiliated to the University of Calcutta (CU), it is recognised by the National Council for Teacher Education (NCTE) and accredited by the National Assessment and Accreditation Council (NAAC).

As part of the Ramakrishna Mission Saradapitha (Belur), Sikshanamandira came into existence in 1958 as the third Teachers' Training College of the state.

== History ==
Ramakrishna Mission Shikshanamandira was established on 12 January 1958, by Swami Vimuktanandaji Maharaj. On that day, the birth anniversary of Swami Vivekananda, Vishuddhananda, the then vice-president of the Ramakrishna Order, laid the foundation stone of the proposed college. Swami Madhavananda, the then general secretary, with many other monks and dignitaries studded the ceremony. Notable Bengali personalities such as Kalidas Nag, Saila Kumar Mukhopadhyay attended the ceremony and discussed over the Nation's need for the trained teachers in translating into concrete the educational-objectives as propounded by Swami Vivekananda. Swami Madhavananda wanted to have similarity with names of the other institutions under "Saradapitha", and at length 'Sikshanamandira' (শিক্ষণমন্দির) was his proposal. The journey of Shikshanamandira started from 4 August 1958, when the classes began. In 1967, the complete infrastructure provided accommodation for 200 students.

It was later recognized by the National Council for Teacher Education (NCTE), and upgraded to a College of Teacher Education (CTE) by the Ministry of Human Resource Development (now known as Ministry of Education), Government of India, in the year 2001. It is currently one of the five CTEs in West Bengal (others are Institute for Education for Women, Hastings House, Govt College of Education, Banipur, Siliguri B.Ed. College and Govt. Training College, Hooghly). Later in 2008, it was upgraded into a post graduate College by the NCTE. In the session 2009–10, M.Ed. course was started.

On the recommendations of the University Grants Commission (UGC), the University of Calcutta conferred the status of an Autonomous College in favour of this institution in 2008, the golden jubilee year of the institution. From this session 2009–10, by the right of the 'Autonomy', Sikshanamandira has successfully furnished a new advanced syllabus for attaining the desired end, the propelling power behind the emergence of this institution in the year 1958 and which is recorded in its first prospectus. It started conducting examinations and publishing results and certificates of the trainees, introducing new department, faculties and training facilities. M.Phil in Education was initiated in the year 2012–13, Post-graduation Diploma in Guidance and Counseling started in 2013. It was recognised as a Study Centre of Netaji Subhas Open University for conducting ODL B.Ed. (with 200 students) in 2013, and Study Centre of West Bengal Board of Primary Education for conducting ODL D. EL.Ed. (with 100 students) in 2013. It obtained approval from the University of Calcutta to have a Research Centre so that it may conduct Programmes like Ph.D. and other research courses starting from academic session 2014–15. The Post-graduation Diploma in Yoga education was started in the year 2016. One of the notable Hindu monks of the Ramakrishna Order, Swami Sarvapriyananda, served as the principal of Shikshanamandira.

== Accreditation ==
In 2007, Ramakrishna Mission Shikshanamandira was accredited by the National Assessment and Accreditation Council (NAAC) with an 'A' grade.

== Hostel life ==
The institution predominantly allow its post-graduate degree programmes for residential male candidates only. On 13 January 1996, a separate hostel building was established; Swami Santanandaji laid the stone. The hostel building is situated at Sharat Chandra Atta Lane, Belur Math, within the college campus. For residential students, the Prayer hall is situated within the main hostel building, where daily prayer, Bhajan, Patha, are performed in a normal procedure. According to the institution, "Discipline in day-to-day life helps to bring forth one's latent potential in a systematic manner".

== Philanthropy ==
Ramakrishna Mission Shikshanamandira has, one of the institutions of the Ramakrishna Mission, stood by the side of the poor during the heyday of COVID-19 pandemic in West Bengal in May 2021. Low cost covid tests including RT-PCR tests were arranged by the mission alongside opening the safe homes within college campus.

== Notable people ==
- Abdul Mannan — former Leader of Opposition in the West Bengal Legislative Assembly

== See also ==
- List of Ramakrishna Mission institutions
- Government degree colleges in India
- Universities and colleges of West Bengal
- List of institutions of higher education in West Bengal
- List of colleges affiliated to the University of Calcutta

== Gallery ==
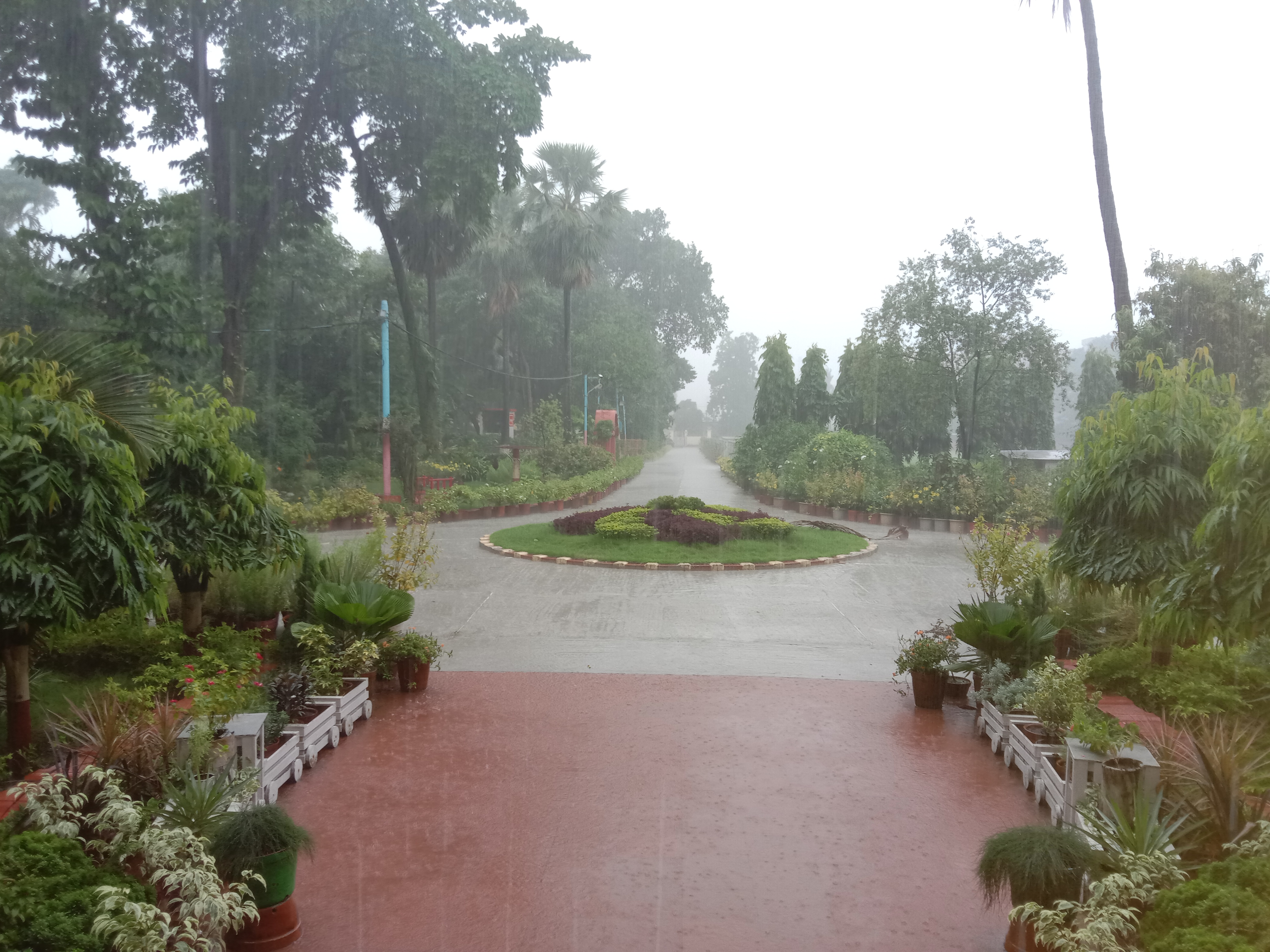
RKMSM college campus

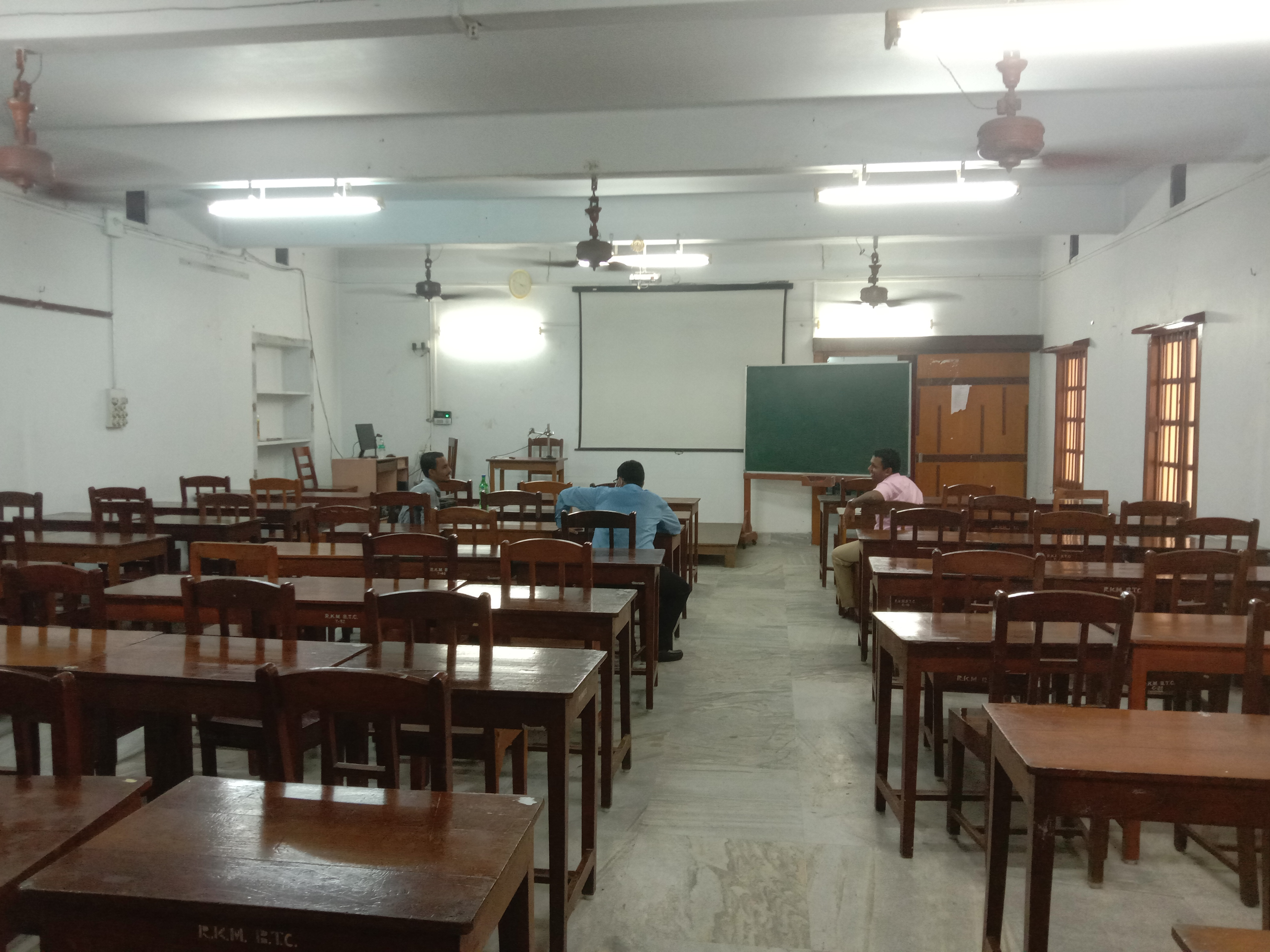
Ramakrishna Hall (examination hall) of RKMSM

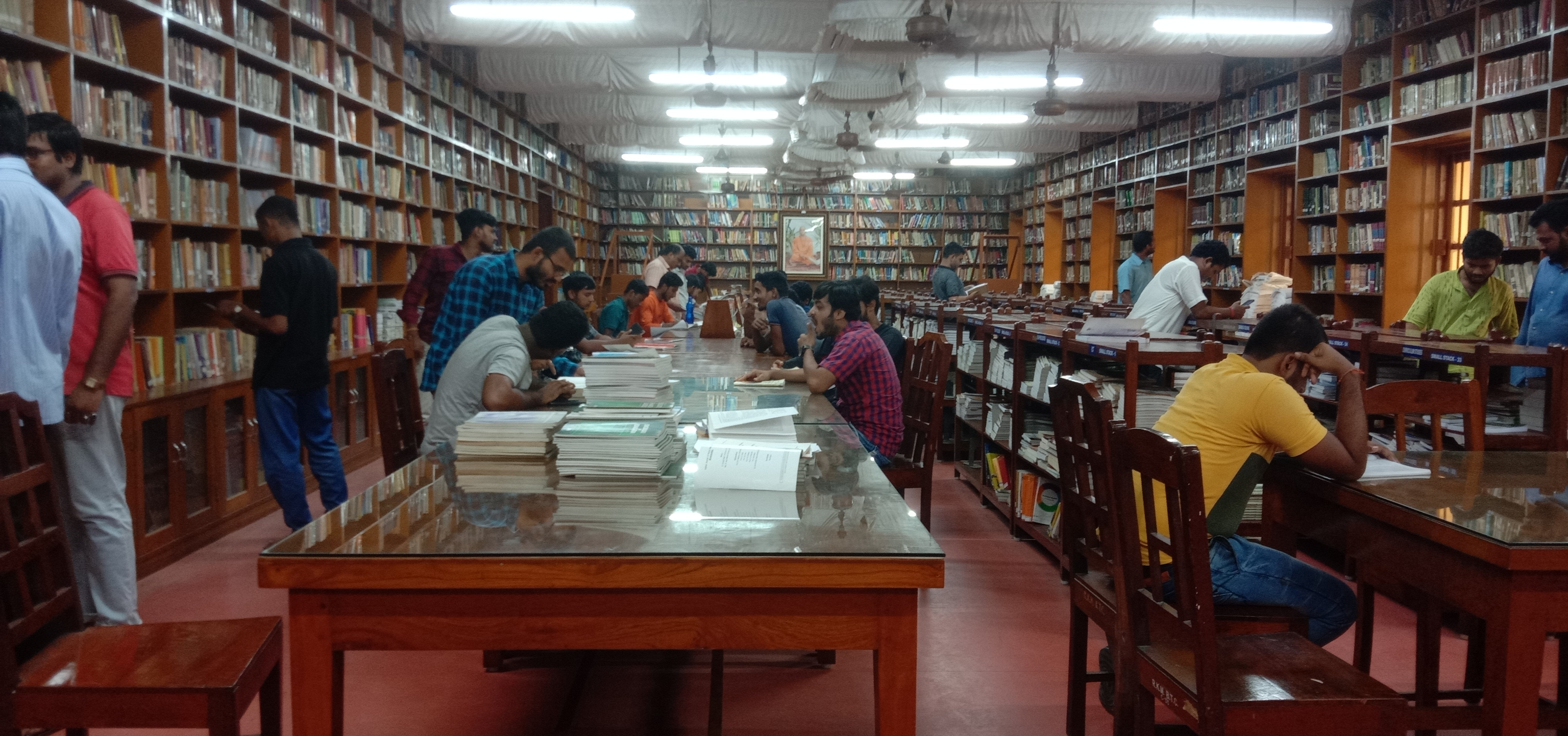
RKMSM library

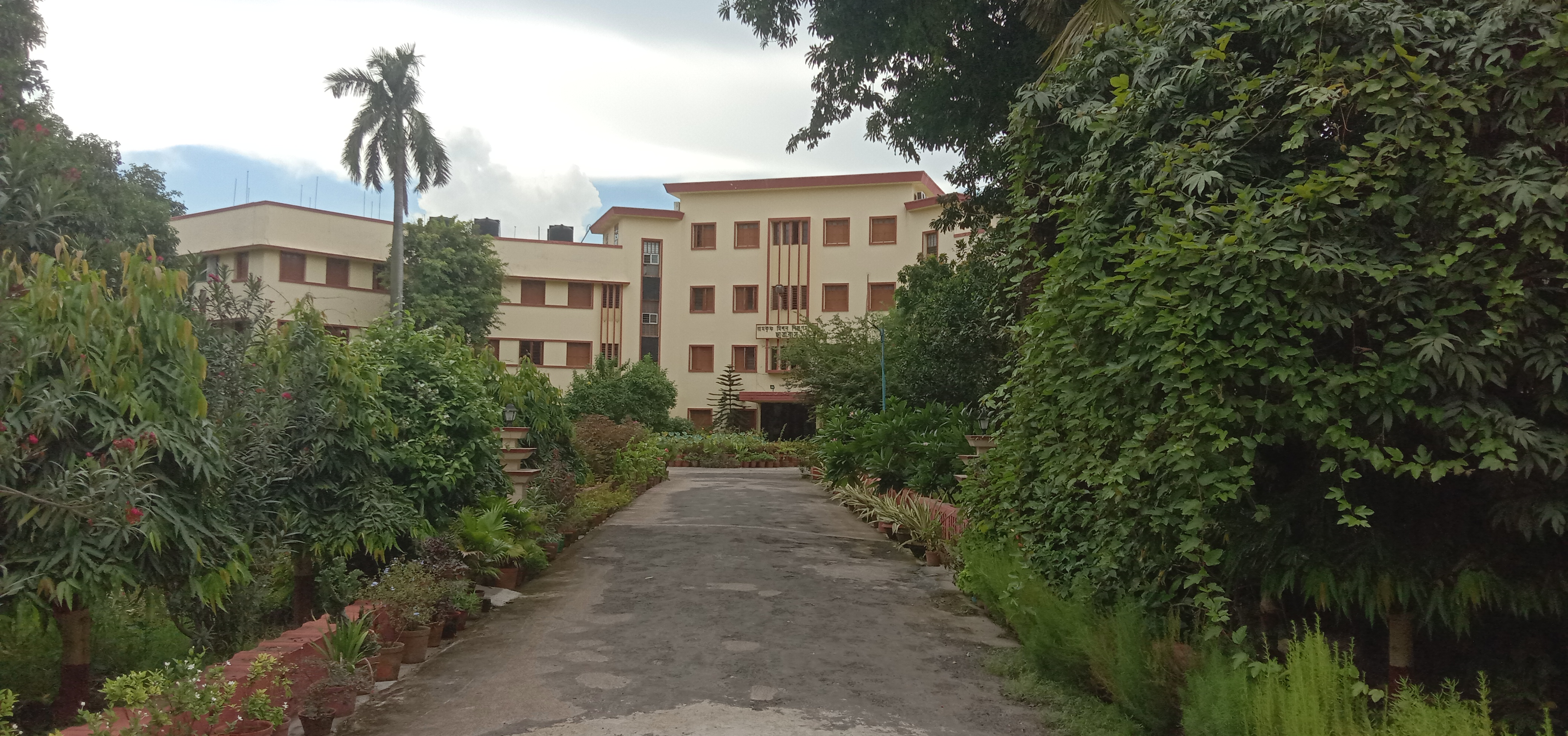
Hostel building of the Ramakrishna Mission Shikshanamandira

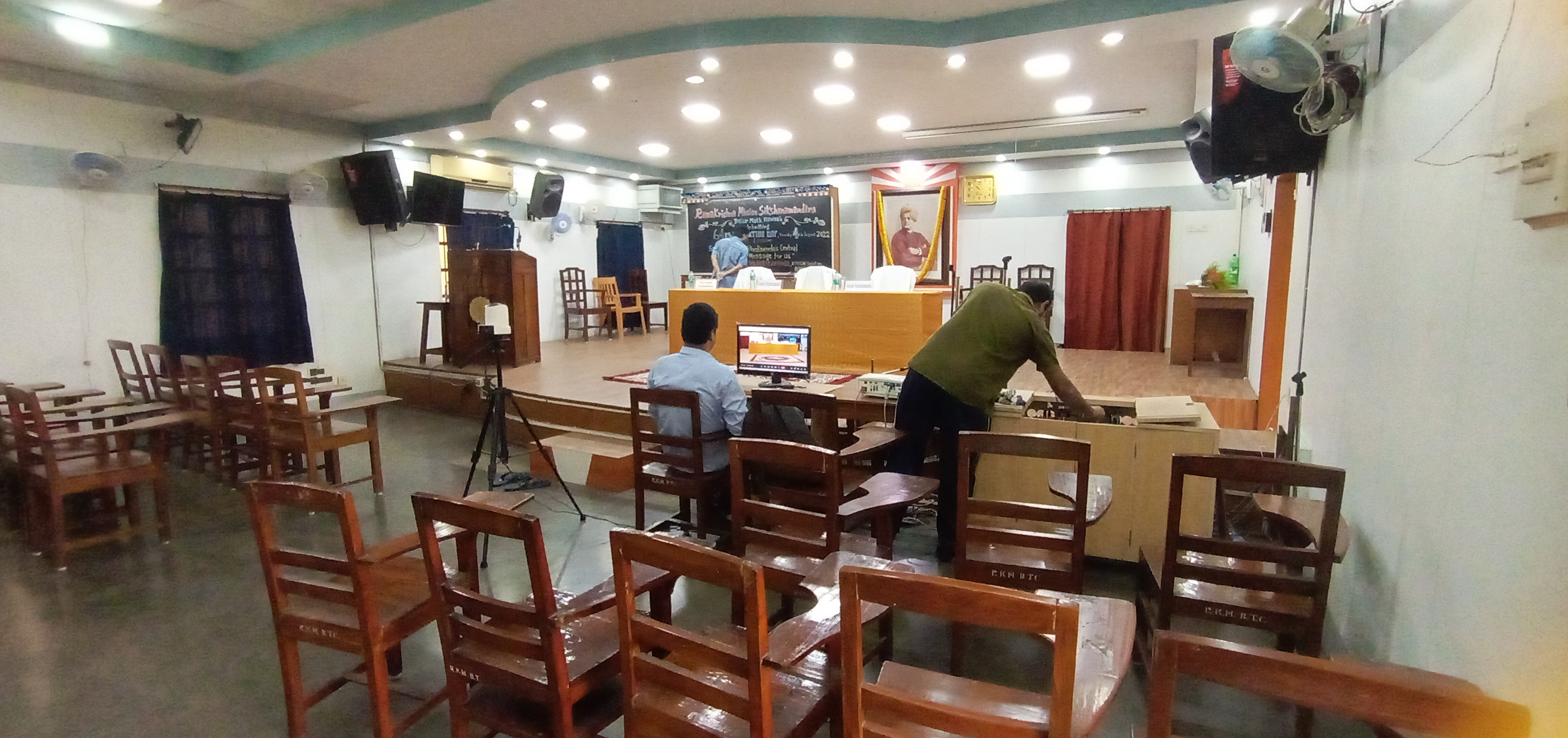
Preparation of a seminar on the foundation day of RKMSM, on August 4, 2022

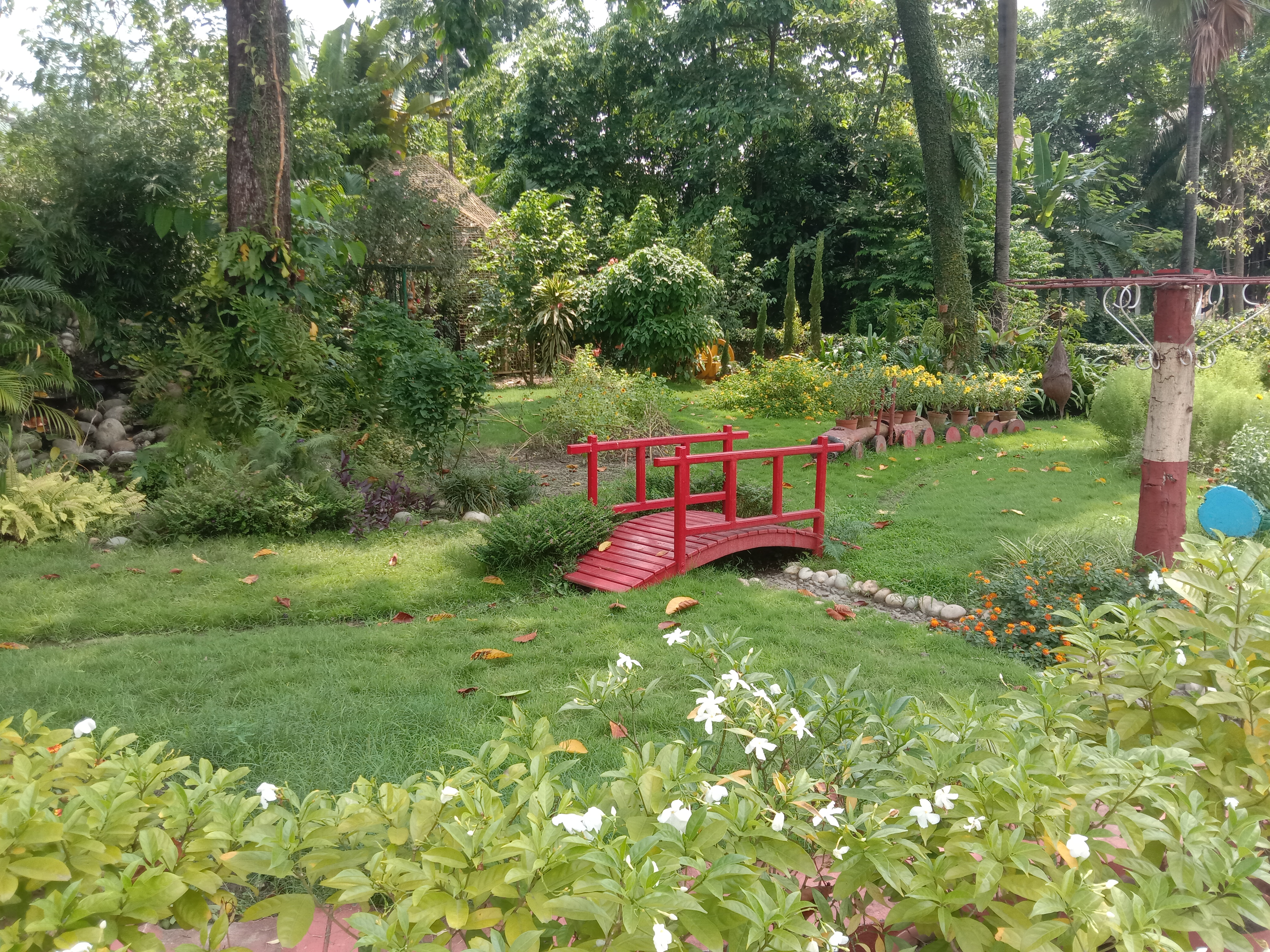
Planned garden within the campus of RKMSM, July 2022

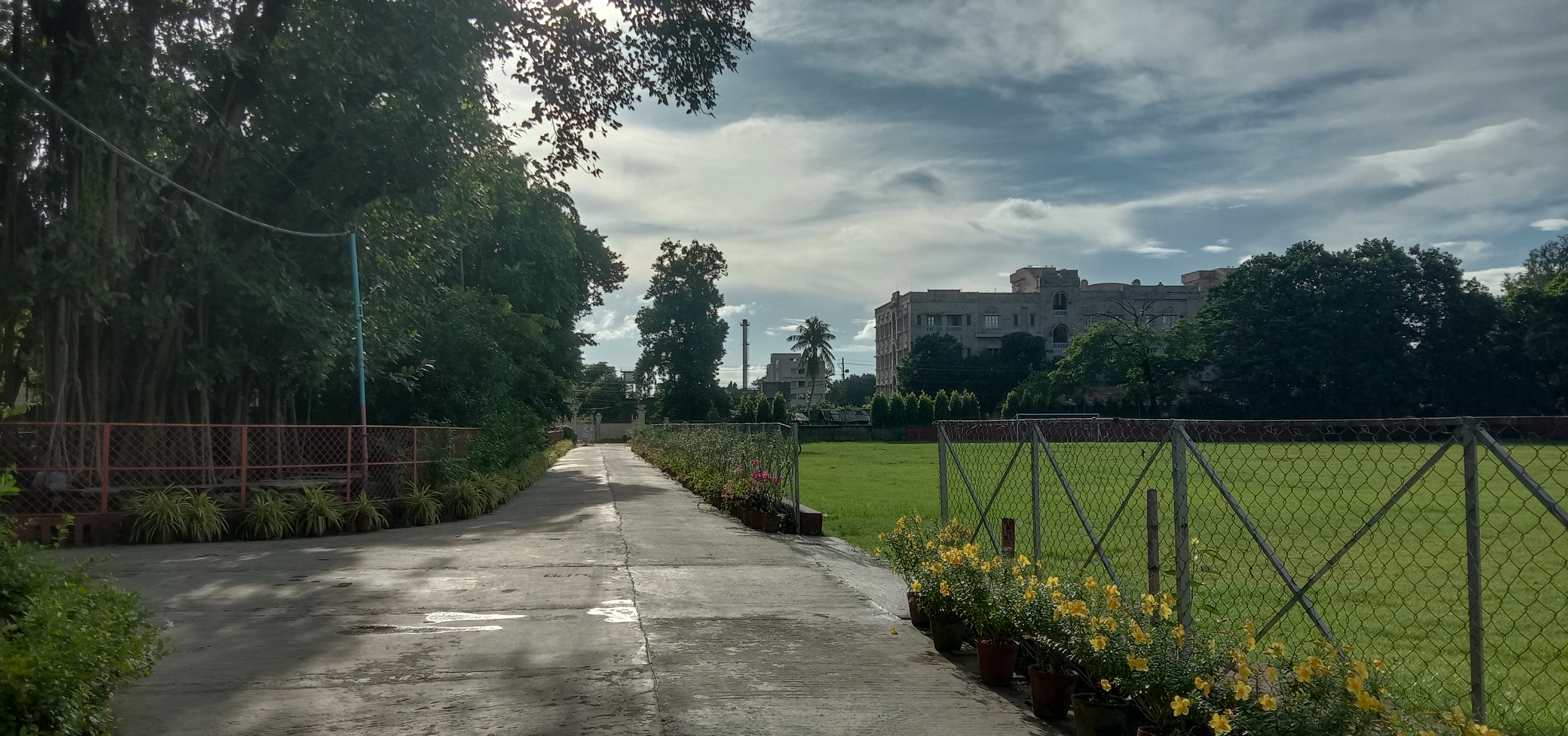
Shikshanamandira campus and its sports ground
