= Swami Harshananda =

Indian spiritual leader and writer (1930–2021)

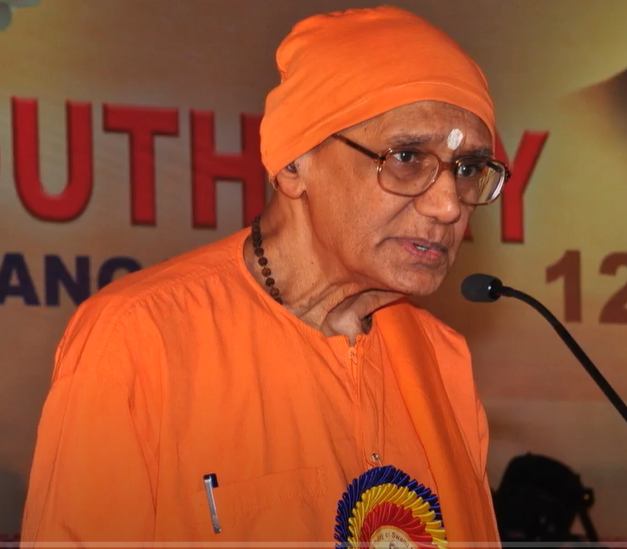

Swami Harshananda (1930–2021) pre monastic name Sundar Krishna, was a monk of the Ramakrishna Order who wrote over 200 works on spirituality, Hinduism, and Vedanta philosophy in Kannada, Sanskrit and English. He promoted daily spiritual practice and meditation, impacting spiritual seekers globally through retreats and courses. The Swami was a polyglot and an expert in Sanskrit, Kannada, Telugu, Hindi, Bengali and English. Throughout his days as the head of the Bangalore Math, the Swami delivered regular spiritual discourses at the Ashrama in Kannada and English. Additionally, he was skilled in singing bhajans.

== Life ==
Swami Harshananda was a gold medalist in mechanical engineering from the University Visvesvaraya College of Engineering, Bengaluru, Karnataka. Attracted by Swami Vivekananda's teachings, he joined the Ramakrishna Mission in 1954.

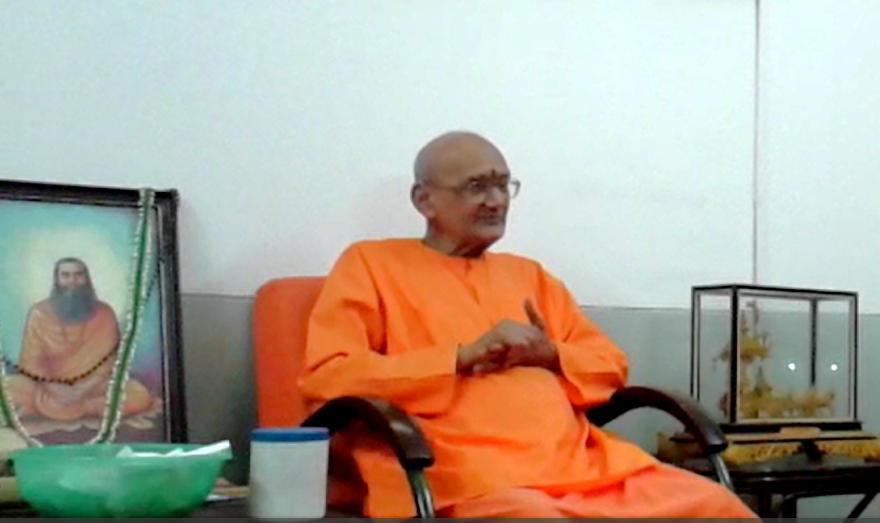

The Swami was an initiated disciple of Swami Virajananda, the sixth President of the Ramakrishna Order. He joined Ramakrisha Math at Bangalore in early 1954 and was ordained as a monk in 1962 by Swami Vishuddhananda, the eighth President of the Order. He has served in various Ramakrishna Math centers including those in Mangalore, Mysore, Belur Math, and Prayagraj. Additionally, he briefly worked at the Ramakrishna Mission's relief center at Andhra Pradesh.

From May 1989 until January 2021, the Swami served as the head of Ramakrishna Math, Bengaluru.

Due to cardiac arrest, the Swami died in his room on 12 January 2021 at 1.05 pm. He was then 91 years old. Upon his death, Narendra Modi, the Prime Minister of India, took to Twitter and wrote, "Swami Harshanandaji Maharaj of the Ramakrishna Math at Basavanagudi, Bengaluru, worked tirelessly for the betterment of society. His compassionate nature and insightful knowledge on a wide range of issues will never be forgotten. Condolences to his devotees. Om Shanti." The Chief Minister of Karnataka, Yediyurappa said, "Swami Harshananda was a scholar who upheld the philosophies of Ramakrishna Paramahamsa and Swami Vivekananda. He was an orator par excellence."

== Works ==
Swami Harshananda authored over 200 works on spirituality, Hinduism, and Vedanta philosophy in Sanskrit, Kannada, and English, including "Spiritual Import of Religious Festivals", "Hinduism: The Eternal Heritage", and "Reflections on the Bhagavad Gita". The Swami also authored the 3 volumes of A Concise Encyclopaedia of Hinduism.

== Principal works ==
- Harshananda, Swami (2008) A Concise Encyclopaedia of Hinduism (in 3 volumes), Bengaluru, Ramakrishna Math Bengaluru
- Nama Ramayana Mahima (in 3 volumes), Kolkata, Advaita Ashrama Publication
- Devapuja or Worship of God, Sri Ramakrishna Math Chennai, 9788178235042
- The Dharmasastras - A Brief Study, Ramakrishna Math Bangalore
- All About Hindu Temples, Sri Ramakrishna Math Chennai, 9788171200856
- Hindu Scriptures - A Brief Anthology, (2000) Ramakrishna Math Bengaluru, BK 0001403
- The Six Systems of Hindu Philosophy, Ramakrishna Math, Chennai. 9788178235141
