= Ramakrishna Mission Ashrama Narainpur =

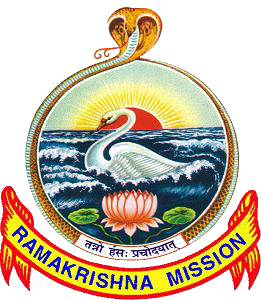
- Emblem
- Abbreviation: RKMN
- Founder: Swami Atmananda
- Type: Spiritual organisation
- Legal status: Foundation
- Purpose: Educational, Philanthropic, Religious Studies, Spirituality
- Headquarters: Belur Math, West Bengal, India
- Region served: Narayanpur
- Secretary: Swami Vyaptananda
- Website: www.rkmnarainpur.org//

Ramakrishna Mission Ashrama, Narainpur (RKMN) is a branch centre of Ramakrishna Math and Mission in state of Chhattisgarh. It was founded on 2 August 1985 by Swami Atmananda to serve the tribals of the remote abujhmarh jungle. These tribals were mute victims of oppression and utter neglect for several centuries. The tribals, popularly known as 'Abujhmarias' have been categorised as particularly vulnerable tribal group by the government of India.

RKMN serves 211 villages with the aim of uplifting the tribals in terms of education, agriculture and employment.

The ashrama has a residential high secondary school, an agricultural training cum demonstration unit, a worker's training centre, a central library, two residential junior schools, three primary schools, thirty ekal vidyalayas, free residential industrial training institute, free computer training centre, a thirty bedded hospital, a mobile medical unit, three nutritional rehabilitation centres, bal grihas for orphans and six fair price shops under its jurisdiction. The nutritional rehabilitation are joint ventures of the ashrama and UNICEF.

VISHWAS is a sister voluntary organisation of RKMN working for the upliftment of tribal girls. It also runs a free residential girls high school at Orcha.

The Ashrama also contains one stadium that has already hosted two national championships and is currently hosting 2024–25 Senior Women's National Football Championship.

== History ==
In the mid-sixties, the Madhya Pradesh government was conducting rehabilitation and relief initiative for the uprooted immigrants from East Pakistan in a place called Mana near Raipur. Swami Atmananda, wrote to Swami Vireswarananda, the then General Secretary of the mission, about his eagerness to serve the displaced people in the camp. Swami Vireswarananda sent Swami Gambhirananda, to tour, plan and execute the relief work. During that period, Swami Atmananda travelled with Swami Gambhirananda in many interior tribal districts like Bastar. Swami Nikhilatmananda and Swami Tyagatmananda teamed up to build the ashrama at Narayanpur. Starting from 1986 to 1993, five sub centres were built in the interior most villages of the region at Akabeda, Kutul, Kachchapal, Irakbhatti and Kundla.

== Government Initiatives and Corporate Social Responsibilities ==
In 2009, this ashrama was chosen for the 25th Indira Gandhi Award for National Integration. Pranab Mukherjee visited the students of the Ashrama to boost their confidence in 2012. He also asked the students to pursue their dreams and ambitions. In 2013, the ashrama commenced 7 trades in the industrial training institute to uplift the tribal youth. In 2019 SAIL-BSP signed MOU with the Ashrama for the growth and development of tribal youths.
