= Gahanananda =

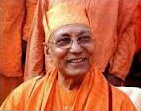
- Swami Gahanananda

Personal life
- Born: Nareshranjan Roychowdhury; October 1916 Paharpur, Ajmiriganj, Bengal Presidency, British India
- Died: 4 November 2007 (aged 91) Ramakrishna Mission Seva Pratishthan, Kolkata, West Bengal, India

Religious life
- Religion: Hinduism
- Philosophy: Vedanta

Senior posting
- Teacher: Swami Virajananda
- Predecessor: Swami Ranganathananda
- Successor: Swami Atmasthananda

Quotation

"Today my life is full with joy".

Swami Gahanananda (October 1916 – 4 November 2007), the 14th President of the Ramakrishna Order, was born in the village of Paharpur in Sylhet District (now in Bangladesh) in October 1916. Known as Naresh Ranjan Roy Choudhury in his pre-monastic days, he joined the Ramakrishna Order at its centre in Bhubaneswar in January 1939 at the age of 22. He received initiation (mantra diksha) in 1939, brahmacharya in 1944 with the name 'Amrita-chaitanya' and Sannyasa from Swami Virajananda Maharaj, the then-President of the Order. He was greatly influenced by the dedicated lives of some of the monks of Ramakrishna Order, especially Swami Prabhananda (Ketaki Maharaj), who was his cousin in his pre-monastic life. He had also once met Swami Abhedananda, a direct disciple of Ramakrishna. He served at the Advaita Ashrama, Kolkata, from 1942 to 1952 and at Shillong centre from 1953 to 1958.

== Biography ==
=== At Seva Pratisthan ===
From 1953 to 1958, he was in Shillong centre, where he worked under the guidance of Swami Saumyanandaji Maharaj. During this period he also organized flood relief operations in Assam a couple of times. Keenly interested in service to sick and suffering people, he was posted to the Mission's hospital centre, Ramakrishna Mission Seva Pratishthan, Kolkata, in 1958. There he worked during the first 5 years as its Assistant Secretary under Swami Dayanandaji and then as its head for 22 years. He worked to develop the services of Seva Pratishthan to cater to the medical needs of more and more people belonging to poor and low-income sections of the society and converted the original small maternity hospital into a 550-bed, modern, well-equipped hospital.

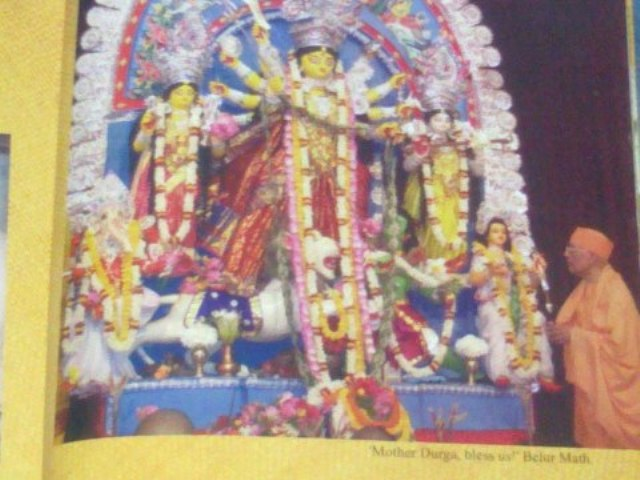
Swami Gahananandaji at Belur Math Durga Puja

=== At Belur Math ===
He was elected a trustee of the Ramakrishna Math and member of the governing body of the Ramakrishna Mission in 1965. In 1979, he was appointed an assistant secretary of the twin organizations. He became the general secretary of the math and mission in 1989 and continued in that post for three years till 1992 when he became a vice-president of the order. In 1993, he represented the Ramakrishna Order at the commemorative function organized by the Council for a Parliament of the World's Religions in Chicago (and attended by 6500 people from all parts of the world) to celebrate the centenary of Swami Vivekananda's historic appearance at the World Parliament of Religions. From 1992, he was also simultaneously the head of Ramakrishna Math (Yogodyan) at Kankurgachhi, Kolkata.

=== As president ===
As a vice-president of the math and mission, Swami Gahananandaji travelled extensively in various parts of the country and visited many branches of the Order. He also visited at different times various places in the US, Canada, England, France, Switzerland, the Netherlands, Russia, Australia, Japan, Myanmar, Sri Lanka, Bangladesh, Singapore, Malaysia and Mauritius. In all these places, he spread the message of Vedanta and Ramakrishna, Sarada Devi and Vivekananda.

Gahanananda was elected the president of the Ramakrishna Math and Ramakrishna Mission in May 2005.

He died on Sunday, 4 November 2007 at 5.35 pm after a prolonged illness. He had been admitted to the Ramakrishna Mission Seva Pratisthan hospital in Kolkata on 4 September.

Thousands of devotees queued up to pay their last respects at Sanskriti Bhavan at Belur Math, where his body was kept after his death. The gates of the Math were kept open throughout the night and following day, until the completion of the last rites. The President of India condoled his death.

== Development of Sevapratisthan Hospital ==
In the year 1932, with the aim of providing adequate health care to pregnant women and infants, a hospital known as "Shishu Mangal Pratishthan" came to be established in a small tin shed, by the efforts of Swami Dayanandaji. In this institution, holding fast to the ideals placed by Dayananda and placing himself under his guidance, Gahanananda shaped himself between 1958 and 1963. Keeping the lofty ideal of "service to humanity in the spirit of worship of God" bright before him, he set on a new spiritual journey. From 1958 to 1985, for 27 years, he was involved in the activities of the institution. It was owing to his efforts that "Shishu Mangal Pratishthan" developed into a full-fledged general hospital known as "Seva Pratishthan".
