= Swami Smaranananda =

Indian monk (1929–2024)

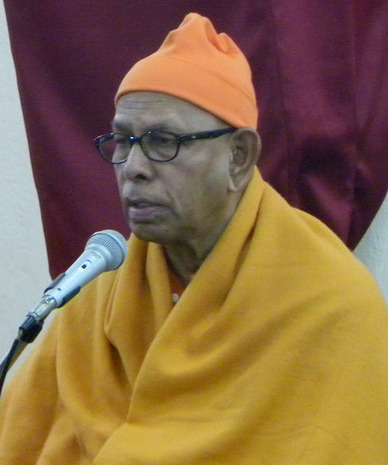
- Smaranananda in 2014

Personal life
- Born: 25 December 1929 Andami, Madras Presidency, British India
- Died: 26 March 2024 (aged 94) Ramakrishna Mission Seva Pratishthan, Kolkata, West Bengal, India

Religious life
- Religion: Hinduism
- Order: Ramakrishna Mission
- Philosophy: Vedanta

Religious career
- Teacher: Swami Shankarananda
- Predecessor: Swami Atmasthananda
- Successor: Swami Gautamananda

Swami Smaranananda (25 December 1929 – 26 March 2024) was an Indian senior Hindu monk of the Ramakrishna Math and Ramakrishna Mission, and its 16th president. He joined the organization in 1952, and was elected president on 17 July 2017.

== Early life and education ==
Smaranananda was born in 1929 in the village of Andami, in the Tanjavur district of Tamil Nadu, India, to a Tamil Hindu family with joint identity. Real name Jayram Venkatraman. He was raised by his aunt, and finished secondary school in Chennai in 1946.

== Religious career ==
Smaranananda received initiation from Swami Shankarananda in 1952, and joined the Ramakrishna Order that same year at its Mumbai centre. He was granted vows of Brahmacharya in 1956 and Sannyasa in 1960, both by Swami Shankarananda.

In 1958, he was posted to Advaita Ashrama in Kolkata, and served there for 18 years in various capacities, including some years as assistant editor of Prabuddha Bharata, the English-language journal founded by Swami Vivekananda. In 1976, he became the secretary of the Ramakrishna Mission Saradapitha, a large educational institution located next to Belur Math, where he served for nearly 15 years. In 1991, he became the head of Sri Ramakrishna Math, Chennai.

In 1983, he was appointed a trustee of the Ramakrishna Math and a member of the governing body of the Ramakrishna Mission. In 1997, he became the general secretary of the organization, and was made a vice-president in 2007.

The 15th president, Swami Atmasthananda, took samadhi on 18 June 2017. Swami Smaranananda, who had been the most senior vice president, was elected to the post of president on 17 July 2017.

Being the president, he played the role of the spiritual head of the organization and relating to that, he granted spiritual initiation to those who sought spiritual association.

== Later life and death ==
In April 2017, Swami Smaranananda inaugurated a toy train at an event at Belur Math. The toy train will pick up and take people around the Math campus. However, the service was discontinued. As of 2024, the service has not resumed, and there have been no official announcements regarding its revival.

In December 2017, he opened the newly renamed headquarters building of the Ramakrishna Mission at Belur Math, now named for its first general secretary, Swami Saradananda.

Srimat Swami Smarananandaji Maharaj attained Mahasamadhi (died) on Tuesday, March 26, 2024, at 8:14 pm at the Ramakrishna Mission Sevapratishthan, Kolkata at the age of 94.

== Works ==
- Musings of a Monk (ISBN 9789381325902): This book is a collection of 68 articles on a variety of subjects, from spiritual writings to a travelog of his many trips around India and to the west.
  - Smriti Smaran Anudhyan (ISBN 9788180405990): Bengali version of the book Musings of a Monk.
