= Atmasthananda =

Indian Hindu monk (1919–2017)

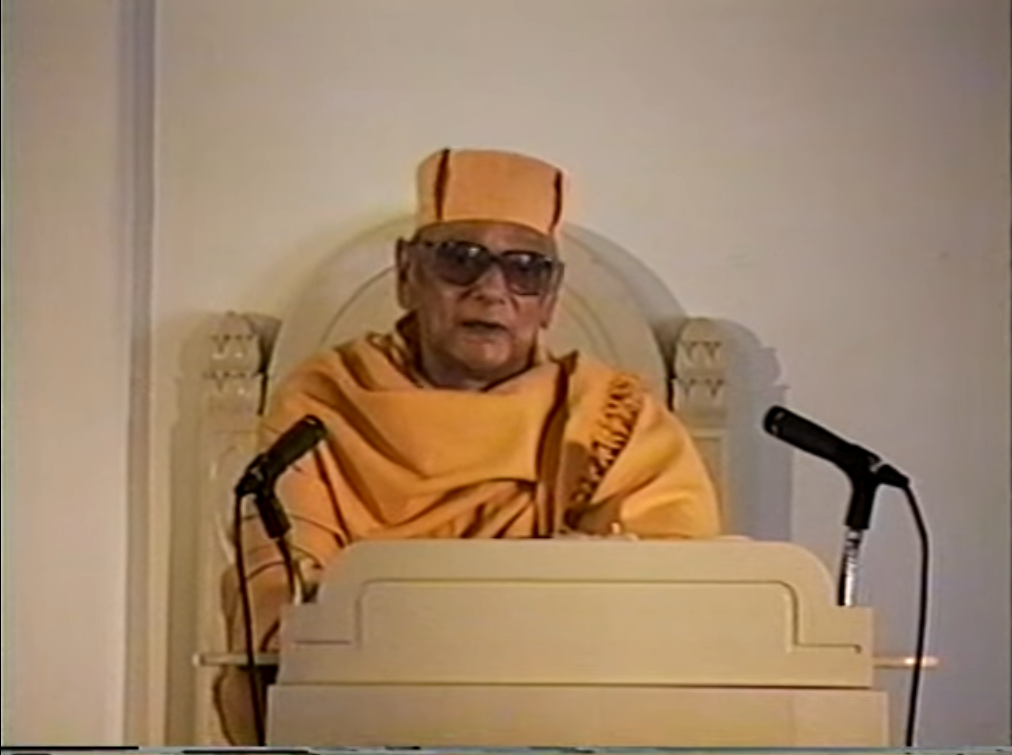
- Swami Atmasthananda

Personal life
- Born: Satyakrishna Bhattacharjee; 21 May 1919 Dinajpur, Bengal Presidency, British India
- Died: 18 June 2017 (aged 98) Ramakrishna Mission Seva Pratishthan, Kolkata, West Bengal, India
- Known for: 15th President, Ramakrishna Math and Mission

Religious life
- Religion: Hinduism
- Philosophy: Advaita Vedanta

Religious career
- Teacher: Swami Vijnanananda
- Predecessor: Swami Gahanananda
- Successor: Swami Smaranananda

Swami Atmasthananda (21 May 1919 – 18 June 2017) was an Indian Hindu monk, who was the 15th president of the Ramakrishna Math and the Ramakrishna Mission.

== Early life ==
He was born on the auspicious Buddha Purnima Tithi on 21 May 1919 at Dinajpur, Bangladesh. He received spiritual initiation (mantra diksha) from Most Revered the then 4th President of the Ramakrishna Order, Swami Vijnanananda (a direct monastic disciple of Ramakrishna) in January 1938. He joined the Ramakrishna Order at Belur Math on 3 January 1941 at the age of 22 years. In 1945, the then-6th President of the order, Swami Virajananda (an initiated disciple of Sarada Devi) gave him brahmacharya vows, and in 1949 sannyasa vows with the swami name of Swami Atmasthananda.

== Career ==
After serving the Order at Belur Math and the branches at Deoghar Vidyapith in 1941 for few months and Mayavati Advaita Ashrama for nearly 3 years, he was offered the opportunity to serve the then Sixth President Swami Virajananda from 1944. He spent several years in his company in the solitude of Shyamla Tal in the Himalayas and also in Belurmath up to 30 May 1951. In 1952, he was posted to Ranchi TB Sanatorium branch as an Assistant Secretary. He worked hard to expand its services in many ways for more than 6 years (1952–1958). He was then sent to Rangoon (Yangon) Sevashrama as its Secretary in 1958. He developed the Sevashrama hospital, and it soon became the best hospital of Burma (Myanmar) at that time. When military rulers took over Rangoon Sevashrama, he returned to India in 1965. He was posted to Rajkot branch as its head in March 1966. The temple of Ramakrishna at Rajkot Ashrama was built on his initiative.

He was elected a trustee of the Ramakrishna Math and member of the governing body of the Ramakrishna Mission in 1973. In 1975, he was appointed an Assistant Secretary of the twin organisations. He was also appointed Secretary of the relief operations of the Math and Mission. Under his stewardship, the Math and Mission conducted massive relief and rehabilitation operations in various parts of India, Nepal and Bangladesh. He became the General Secretary of the Math and Mission in 1992 and continued in that post until 1997, when he became a vice-president of the Order on 22 May 1997.

As a vice-president of the Math and Mission, he travelled extensively in various parts of the country and visited many branches of the Order and some unaffiliated centres. In 1998, he visited various places in the US, Canada, Japan and Singapore. He also went to Malaysia, Fiji, Sri Lanka and Bangladesh at different times. In all those places, he spread the message of Ramakrishna, Sarada Devi, Vivekananda and Vedanta and also gave spiritual initiation (mantra diksha) to many seekers.

Atmasthananda was elected as the 15th President of the Ramakrishna Math and the Ramakrishna Mission on 3 December 2007.

Inspired by the Teachings of Swami Vivekananda since his young days, Indian Prime Minister Narendra Modi wanted to join the mission to become a monk. He spent some time in the Rajkot ashram, where he closely interacted with Swami Atmasthananda. He told Modi that "sanyas was not for him and his work was among people and not in seclusion."

== Personal life ==
Born Satyakrishna Bhattacharya, he was the eldest of seven brothers and three sisters. His second brother Jyotikrishna also joined the Ramakrishna Order as Swami Yuktananda. A sister, Arati, also became a sanyaasini named as Achyutaprana. Two other brothers who took sanyaas are Manindra krishna as Kalikrishnananda and Sourendrakrishna as Swami Gopeshananda.

== Death ==
Atmasthananda died on 18 June 2017. Indian Prime Minister Narendra Modi expressed his condolence in a tweet saying: "The demise of Swami Atmasthananda ji is a personal loss for me. I lived with him during a very important period of my life."
