= Belur Math railway station =

Railway station in West Bengal

Belur Math
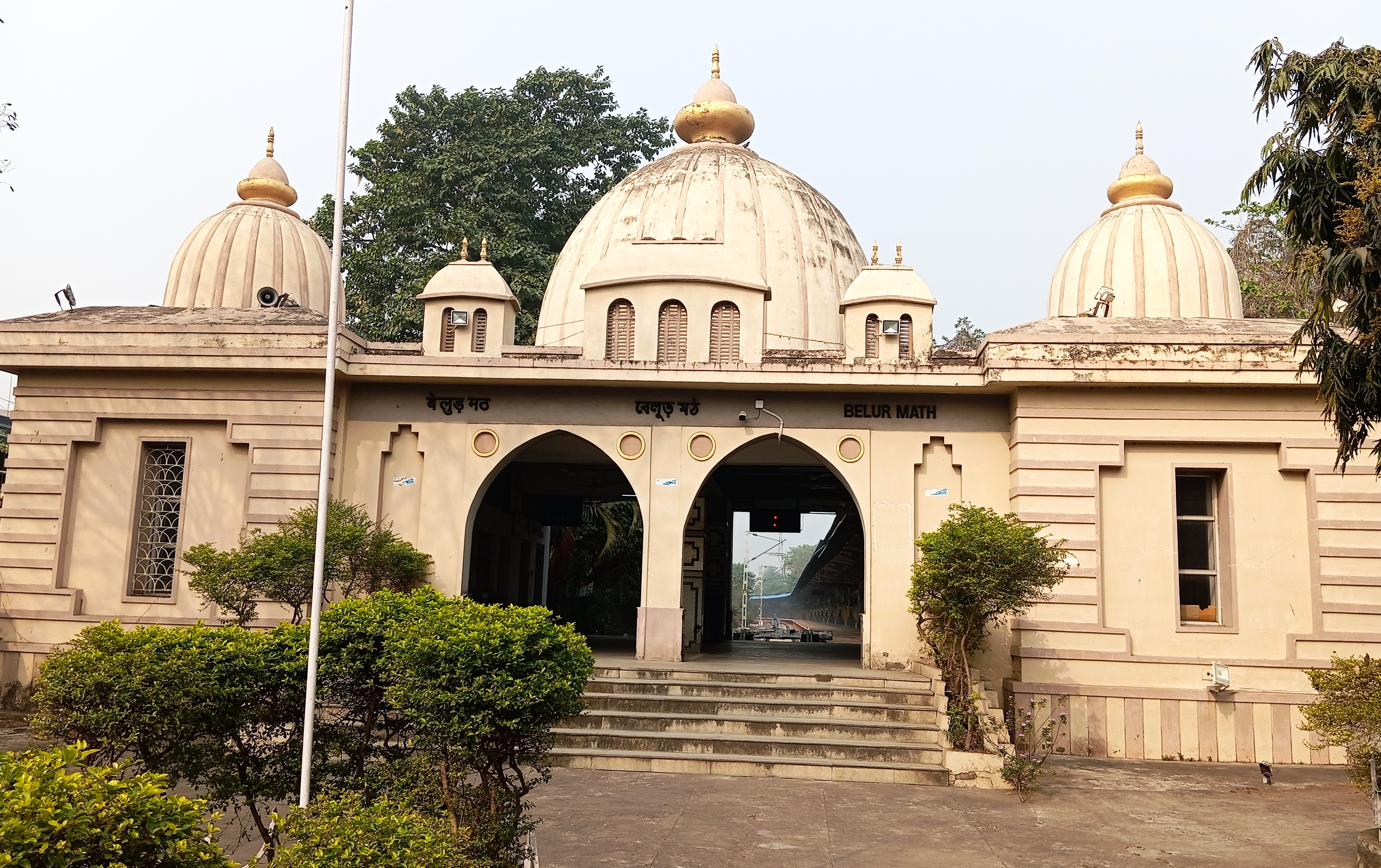
- Belur Math railway station

General information
- Location: Grand Trunk Rd, Belur, West Bengal; India
- Coordinates: 22°37′52″N 88°21′05″E
- System: Kolkata Suburban Railway
- Owner: Indian Railways
- Operator: Eastern Railway
- Line: Kolkata Suburban Railway
- Platforms: 1
- Tracks: 1

Construction
- Structure type: Standard (on ground station)
- Parking: No
- Cycle facilities: No

Other information
- Status: Operational
- Station code: BRMH
- Zone(s): Eastern Railway
- Division(s): Howrah

History
- Opened: 2003

Services
Preceding station	Kolkata Suburban Railway	Following station
Liluah towards Howrah Junction	Eastern Line Belur Math branch line	Terminus
Route map
Location
- Location within Kolkata Location within West Bengal Location within India

Belur Math railway station is a terminal railway station of the Kolkata Suburban Railway network, which connects Belur Math, temple and the headquarters of the Ramakrishna Math and Mission, with Howrah via the Eastern main line of Eastern Railway.

== Nearby places of interest ==
The Belur Math which is the headquarters of the Ramkrishna Mission and a leading tourist and pilgrimage destination for people across the world, is located on the banks of river Ganga, at a distance of about 1.5 km from the station. It was established by Swami Vivekananda in the year 1898 and also contains the Samadhi of the great Saint and youth icon along with that of Sarada Devi and Ramakrishna Paramahamsa.

== See also ==
- Kolkata Suburban Railway
