= Vireshwarananda =

Personal life
- Born: Pandurang Prabhu; 31 October 1892 Gurupura, Near Mangalore, British India
- Died: 13 March 1985 (aged 92) Belur Math, West Bengal, India

Religious life
- Religion: Hinduism
- Philosophy: Advaita Vedanta

Senior posting
- Teacher: Sarada Devi
- Predecessor: Swami Madhavananda
- Successor: Swami Gambhirananda

Swami Vireshwarananda, the tenth President of the Ramakrishna Math and Ramakrishna Mission, was born on 31 October 1892 at Gurupura, Near Mangalore, South India. His pre-monastic name was Pandurang Prabhu; he was later known as Prabhu Maharaj. After his father's death at an early age, his mother moved with them to his maternal uncle's house at Mangalore.

Pandurang Prabhu studied at Madras (Chennai) Law College, where he had a chance to read the Complete Works of Swami Vivekananda. He joined at the Belur Math in the first half of 1916 and was initiated by the Holy Mother, in June 1916. He received his monastic vows from Swami Brahmananda on 12 January 1920.

After his initiation into sannyasa, Swami Vireshwarananda stayed at Varanasi. In 1921, he was sent to the Advaita Ashrama at Mayavati as a monastic worker. Later, he became its manager at Kolkata Office and was made its head in 1927. He became a trustee of the Ramakrishna Math and a member of the governing body of the Ramakrishna Mission in 1929. He was made one of the Joint Secretaries of the Order on 7 April 1938.

Vireshwarananda was sent to Varanasi, Orissa, Madras Presidency, Ceylon and other places to organize the workings of ashramas. In 1942 he finally returned to the Belur Math. When the Indian subcontinent and Asia were passing through a critical period during 1942 to 1947, he had successfully conducted several relief operations. When Swami Madhavananda took leave from his office of the General Secretary on health grounds, Vireshwarananda officiated on his behalf from 1949 to 1951. In May 1961 he was made the General Secretary of the Order, and he became the President of the Ramakrishna Math and Ramakrishna Mission, on 22 February 1966 after the death of Madhavananda.

As the President of the Order, Vireshwarananda travelled extensively throughout India to spread the message of the Ramakrishna-Vivekananda Movement. During his tenure, the Order grew and became consolidated. He introduced many philanthropic activities including rural development, 'Pallimangal' and training of youth in self-employment, 'Janashiksha', which encouraged the Order to venture into newer fields and thus expand its scope of service.

Though Vireshwarananda was busy with administrative work, he could find time for reading extensively. He translated into English many Sanskrit scriptures, including the gloss of Sridhara on the Bhagavadgita, the commentaries of Sankara and Ramanuja on Brahmasutra. He served the order as its president until he died on 13 March 1985.
