= Belur, West Bengal =

Belur
- Neighbourhood
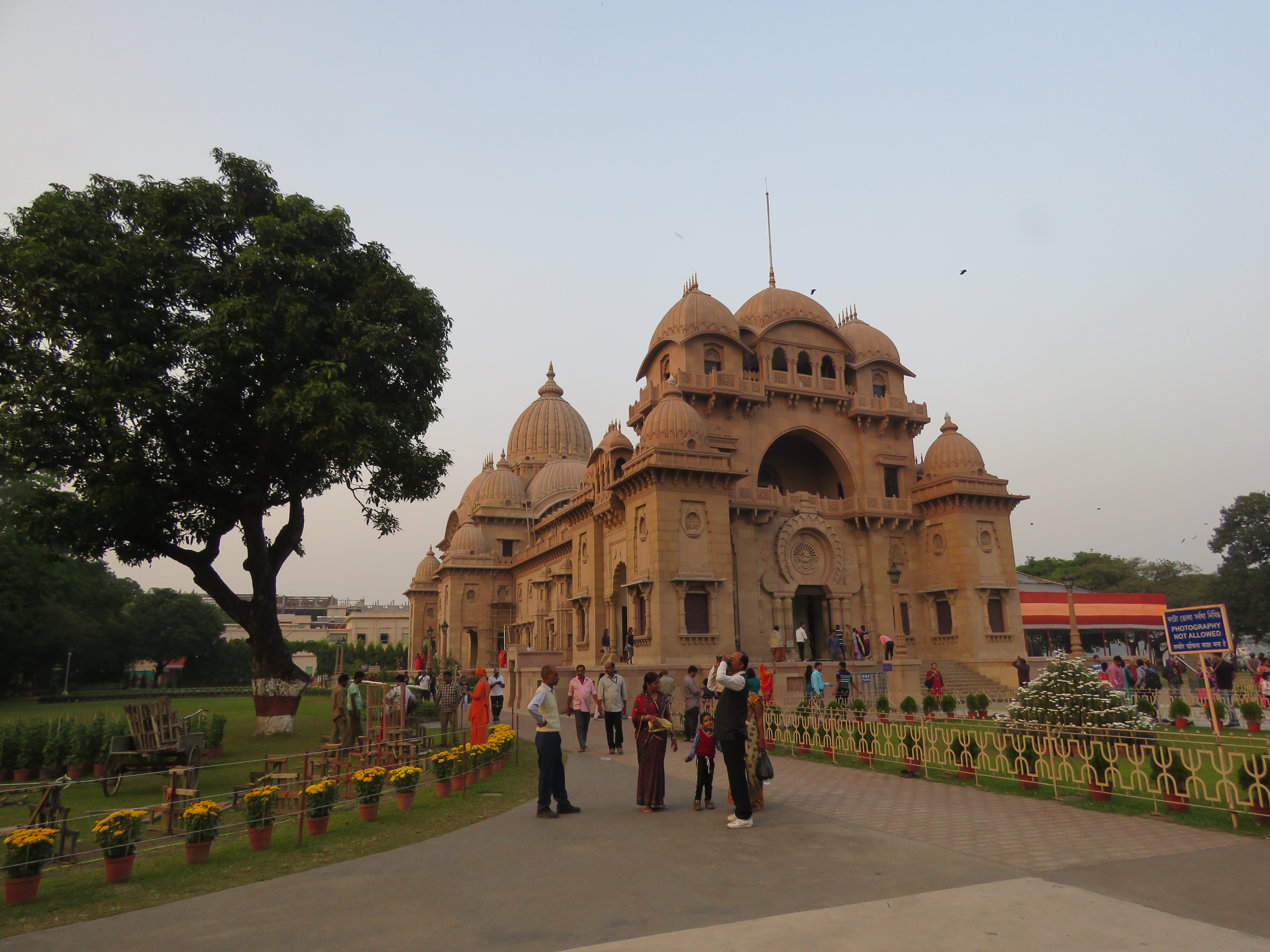
- Belur Math, Belur

- Location within Kolkata Location within West Bengal Location within India
- Coordinates: 22.6357°N 88.3398°E
- Country: India
- State: West Bengal
- Division: Presidency
- District: Howrah
- City: Howrah
- Metro Station: Dakshineswar and Howrah

Government
  - Type: Municipal Corporation
  - Body: Howrah Municipal Corporation
- Elevation: 13 m (43 ft)

languages
  - official: Bengali, English
- Time zone: UTC5:30 (IST)
- PIN: 711201, 711202
- Telephone code: +91 33
- Vehicle registration: WB
- HMC wards: 55, 56, 57, 58, 60, 61, 62
- Lok Sabha constituency: Howrah
- Vidhan Sabha constituency: Bally
- Climate: humid (Köppen)
- Avg. summer temperature: 42 °C (108 °F)
- Avg. winter temperature: 09 °C (48 °F)

Belur is a neighbourhood in Howrah of Howrah district in the Indian state of West Bengal. It is a part of the area covered by Kolkata Metropolitan Development Authority (KMDA). Belur is under the jurisdiction of Belur Police Station and Bally Police Station of Howrah City Police. The area is best known for Belur Math, a religious monastery containing a complex of temples. Belur Math is famous for being the headquarters of the Ramakrishna Math, a monastic order, as well as that of the related Ramakrishna Mission, both founded by Swami Vivekananda. On the opposite side of the Hooghly River, opposite to Belur Math is the Dakshineswar Kali Temple.

== Location ==
Belur is situated on the west bank of Hooghly River. It is located between Liluah and Bally.

== Recreation ==
Rangoli Mall in Belur (on Girish Ghosh Road) has a gross leasable area of 3.5 lakh square feet. It was opened in 2015 and houses stores of premium brands, including Max Lifestyle, Domino's Pizza, Archies and Spencer's retail among others. There is INOX multiplex also in the mall.

== Transport ==
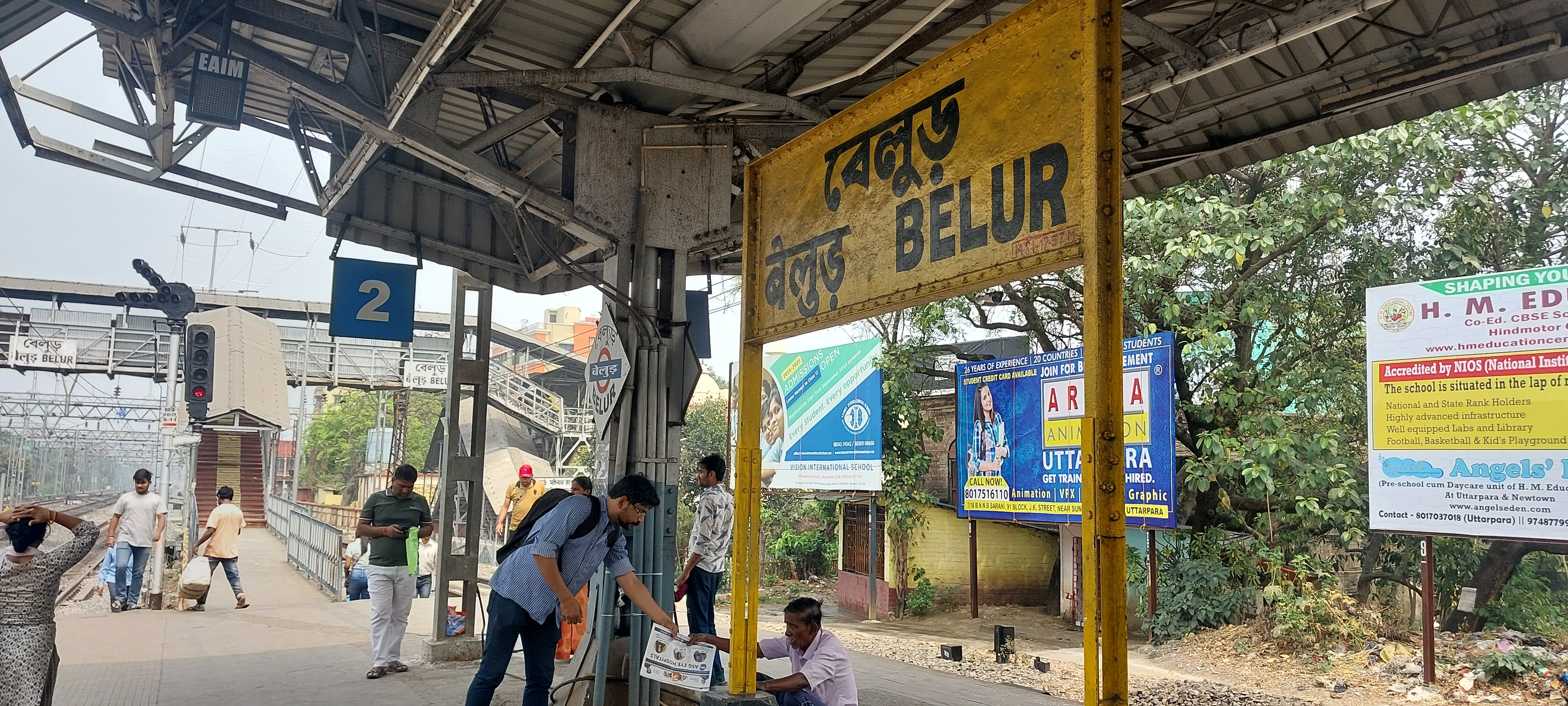
Belur railway station at Belur

State Highway 6/Grand Trunk Road passes through the west side of Belur. Girish Ghosh Road runs along the eastern part of Belur. Some Private Buses (51, 54 and 56), Minibuses (Bally Khal-Khidirpur and Belur Math-Esplanade) and CSTC Buses (S32A on Belgharia-Howrah Station and AC50 on Belur Math-Garia) serve the neighbourhood.

Belur is linked to Howrah Station via Belur railway station and Belur Math railway station.

Netaji Subhas Chandra Bose International Airport (CCU) is the closest major airport to Belur Railway Station, located about 15–18 km away.

== See also ==
- Swami Vivekananda
- Ramakrishna Paramhansa
- Hooghly River
- Liluah
