= Belur Math =

Headquarters of the Ramakrishna Mission in West Bengal, India

Belur Math বেলুড় মঠ
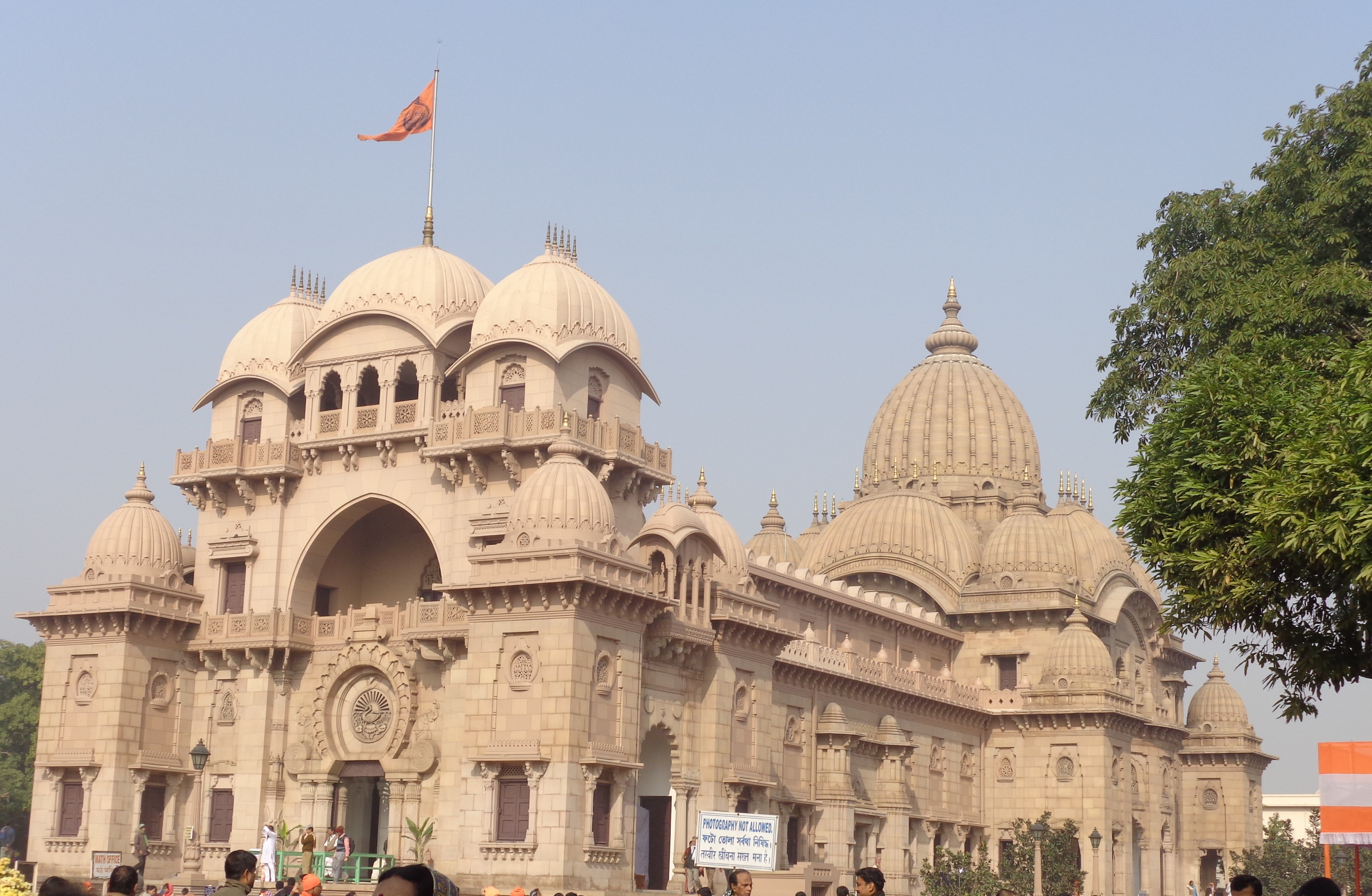
- Sri Ramakrishna Temple, at Ramakrishna Belur Math

- Location in West Bengal

Religion
- Affiliation: Hinduism
- District: Howrah
- Festivals: Celebration of Sri Ramakrishna; Swami Vivekananda and Sarada Devi's birthdays; Durga Puja, Janmasthami; Christmas; Kali Puja; Shiva Ratri

Location
- Location: Belur
- State: West Bengal
- Country: India
- Coordinates: 22°37′57″N 88°21′23″E

Architecture
- Type: Fusion of Hindu, Christian motifs
- Creator: Ramakrishna Mission
- Established: January 1897; 129 years ago
- Temple: 4
- Inscriptions: none

Website
- belurmath.org

Belur Math (pronounced [ˈbeluɽ ˈmɔʈʰ]) is the headquarters of the Ramakrishna Math and Ramakrishna Mission, founded by Swami Vivekananda, the chief disciple of Ramakrishna Paramahamsa. It is located in Belur, West Bengal, India on the west bank of Hooghly River. The land for the Math was purchased on 4 March 1897. Swami Vivekananda established Belur Math by placing holy relics of Shri Ramakrishna at Belur Math premises on 9 December 1898. Swami Vivekananda returned from America via Colombo and with a small group of disciples started working on the construction of two temples, one at Belur and the other one at Mayavati, Almora, which was called the Advaita Ashrama. The temple is the heart of the Ramakrishna Movement. It is notable for its architecture that fuses Hindu, Buddhist, and Christian art and motifs as a symbol of unity of all religions. In 2003, Belur Math railway station was also inaugurated which is dedicated to Belur Math Temple.

== History ==
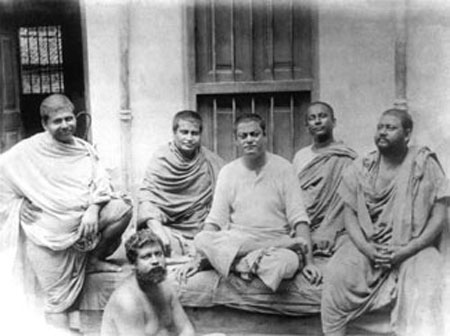
Monastic disciples, Trigunatitananda, Shivananda, Swami Vivekananda, Turiyananda, Brahmananda. Below Sadananda, at Belur Math, 20 June 1899.

In the beginning of 1897, Swami Vivekananda arrived at Baranagar, Calcutta with his small group of Western disciples. Two monasteries were founded by him, one at Belur, which became the headquarters of Ramakrishna Mission and the other at Mayavati on the Himalayas, in Champawat District, Uttrakhand, called the Advaita Ashrama. These monasteries were meant to receive and train young men who would eventually become sannyasis (religious ascetic) of the Ramakrishna Mission, and to give them a training for their work. The same year the philanthropic activity was started and relief of the famine was carried out.

Swami Vivekananda's days as a parivrajaka (wandering monk) before his visit to Parliament of Religions, took him through many parts of India, and he visited several architectural monuments like the Taj Mahal, Fatehpur Sikri palaces, Diwan–I–Khas, palaces of Rajasthan, ancient temples of Maharashtra, Gujarat, Karnataka, Tamil Nadu and other places. During his tour in America and Europe, he came across buildings of architectural importance of Modern, Medieval, Gothic and Renaissance styles. It is reported that Vivekananda incorporated these ideas in the design of the Belur Math temple.

Swami Vijnanananda, a brother-monk of Swami Vivekananda and one of the monastic disciples of Ramakrishna, who was, in his pre-monastic life, a civil engineer, designed the temple according to the ideas of Vivekananda and Swami Shivananda, the then President of Belur Math laid the foundation stone on 13 March 1929. The massive construction was handled by Martin Burn & Co. The mission proclaims the Belur Math as, "A Symphony in Architecture". The Math can be reached by direct EMU train services from Howrah, ferry and by road.

== Campus ==
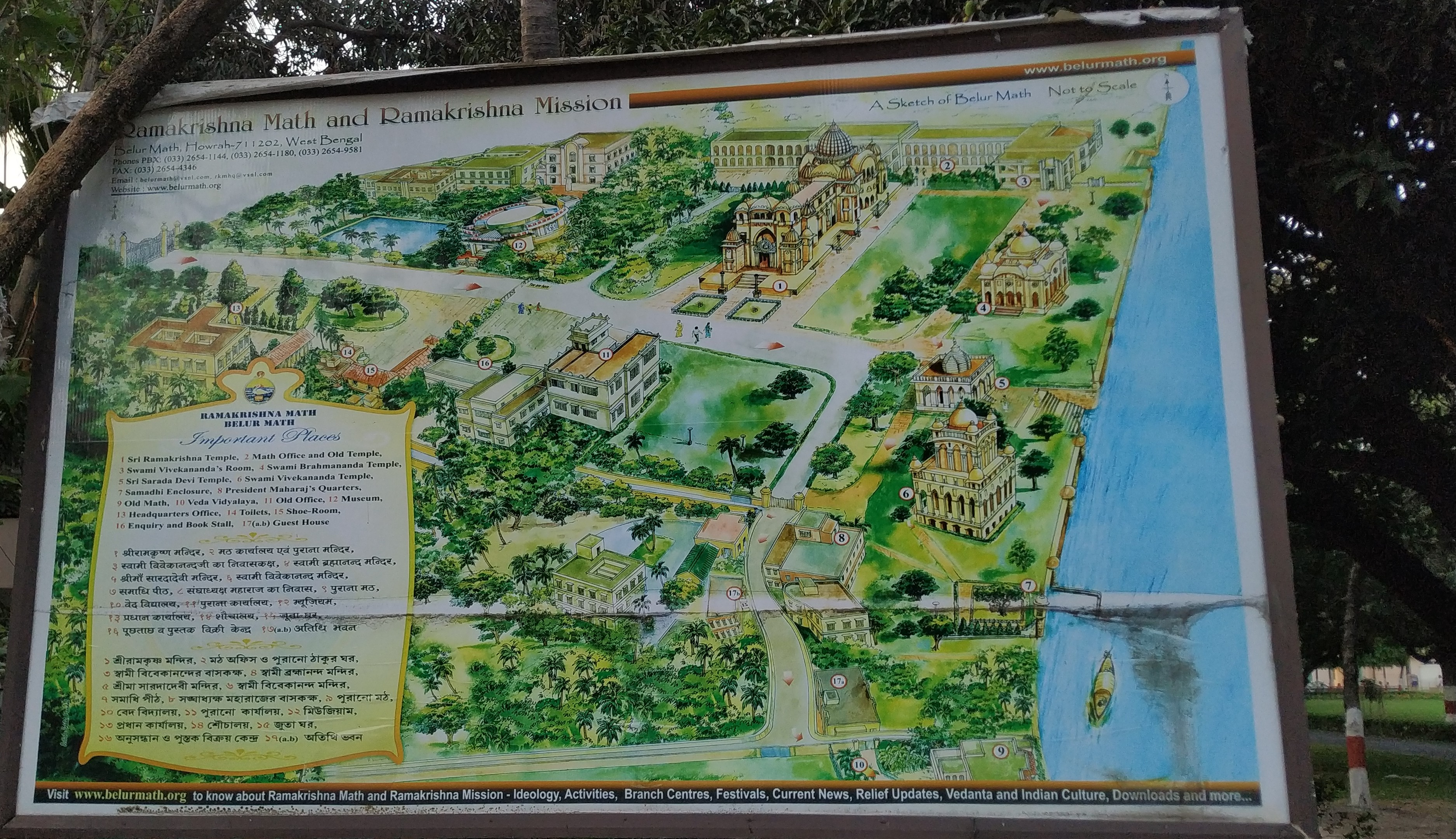
A sketch of Belur Math campus

The 16-hectare (40-acre) campus of the Belur Math on the banks of the Hooghly includes temples dedicated to Ramakrishna, Sarada Devi and Swami Vivekananda, in which their relics are enshrined, and the main monastery of the Ramakrishna Order. The campus also houses a Museum containing articles connected with the history of Ramakrishna Math and Mission. Several educational institutions affiliated with the Ramakrishna Mission are situated in the vast campus adjacent to Belur Math, including Ramakrishna Mission Shilpamandira. The Belur Math is considered one of the prime tourist spots near Kolkata and place of pilgrimage by devotees. The ex-president APJ Abdul Kalam regarded Belur Math as a "place of heritage and national importance."

=== Sri Ramakrishna Temple ===
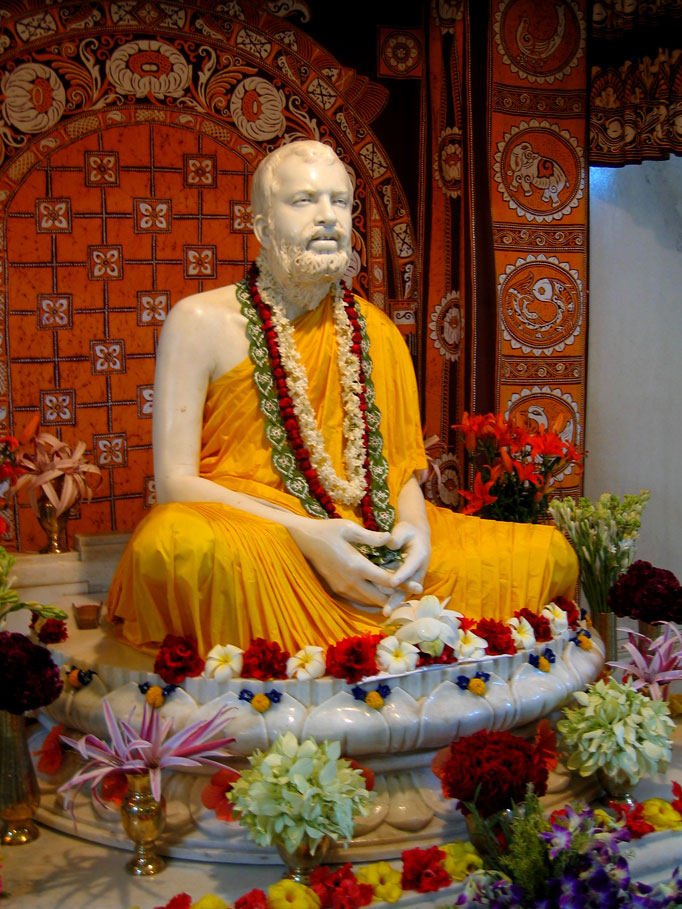
The marble statue of Ramakrishna at Belur Math Khandana Bhava Bandhana (Arati Song)

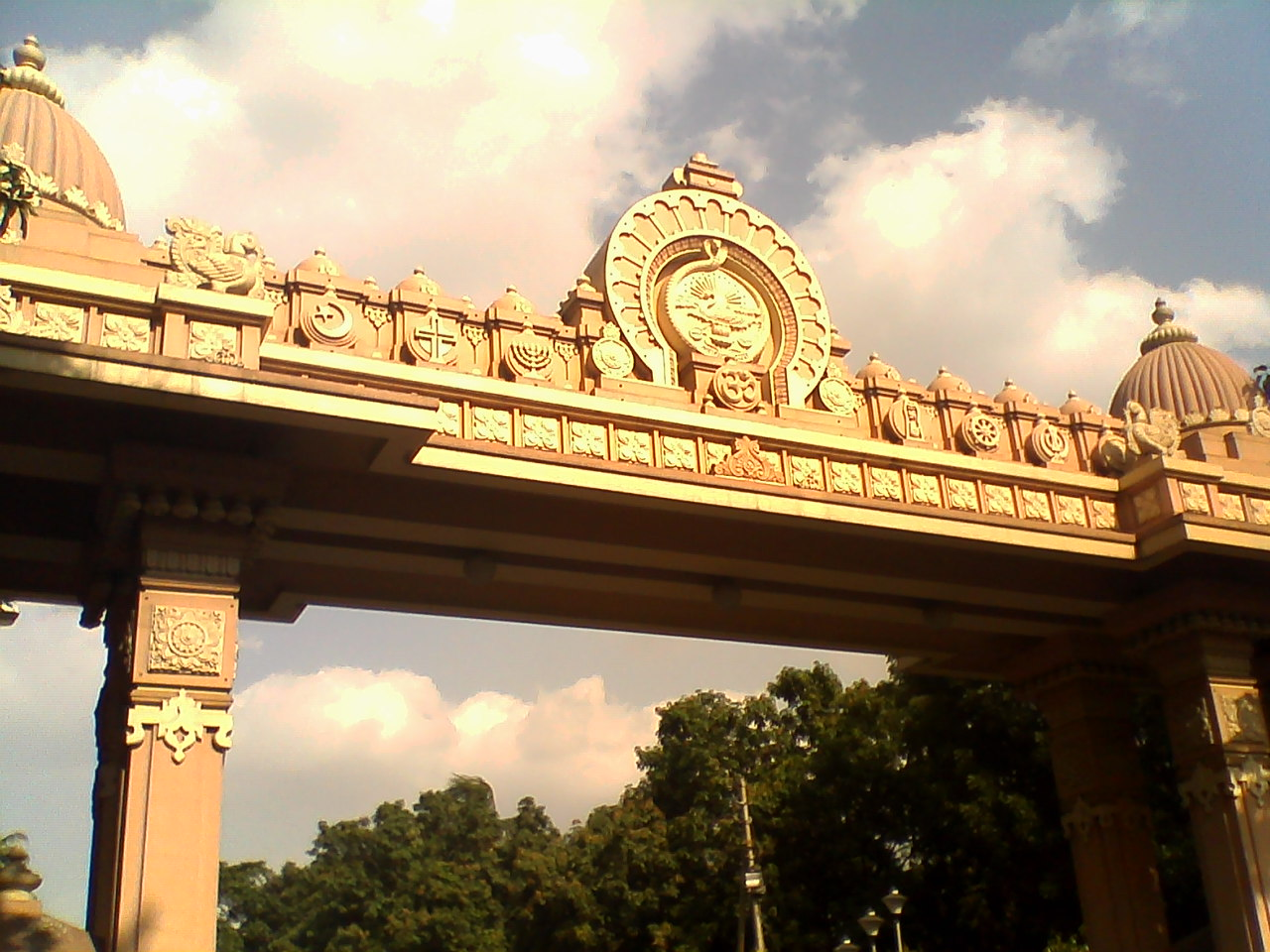
The entrance gate of Belur Math has symbols of all religions

The design of the temple was envisioned by Swami Vivekananda and the architect was Swami Vijnanananda, a direct monastic disciple of Ramakrishna. Sri Ramakrishna Temple was consecrated on 14 January, the Makar Sankranti Day in 1938.

The Ramakrishna temple at the Belur Math is designed to "celebrate the diversity of Indian Religions" and resembles a temple, a mosque, a church if seen from different positions. The architectural style and symbolism from a number of religions have been incorporated into the design of the temple at Belur Math, to convey the "universal faith" in which the movement believes. The temple is considered a prime example of the importance of "material dimension" of religion.

The main entrance of the temple, has a facade influenced by Buddhist styles in the Buddhist stupa at Sanchi & the main entrance of the Ajanta Caves. The structure which rises over the entrance is modelled on the Hindu temples of South India with their lofty towers. The windows and balconies inside the temple draw upon the Rajput (Hindu) style of north India. The central dome is derived from the Renaissance architecture of the Duomo of the Florence Cathedral. The ground plan is in the shape of Christian cross.

The height of the temple is 34.3 metres (112.5 ft) and covers a total area of 3,060 m^{2} (32,900 sq ft). The temple mainly is built of chunar stone and some portion in the front is of cement. The high entrance of the temple is like a South Indian Gopuram and the pillars on both sides represent Buddhistic architectural style. The three umbrella-like domes on the top built in Rajput-Moghul styles give an idea of thatched roofs of the village Kamarpukur.

The circular portion of the entrance is an intermingling of Ajanta style with Hindu architecture and within it, placing the emblem of the Order, is a representation of beauty and solemnity. Just above seen is a replica of a Shiva lingam. The natmandira, the spacious congregational hall attached to the sanctum, resembles a church, especially of St Peter's Church in Rome. The pillars in a line on its both sides are according to Doric or Greek style. The beam above is held by decorative brackets similar to the Meenakshi Temple at Madurai in Tamil Nadu. The elaborate designs on the pillars resemble the Orissa style.

The hanging balconies above the natmandir and the windows show the effect of Moghul architecture used in the Fatehpur Sikri. The broad parikrama path for doing circumambulatory rounds on all sides of the garbhamandira (sanctum sanctorum) are built like Buddhist chaityas and Christian Churches. The lattice work statues of Navagraha figures are etched on semi-circular top of outside the temple. The golden kalasha is placed on the top of the temple and has a full-bloomed lotus below. The architecture of the big dome and of the other domes show a shade of Rajput, Bengal terracotta and Lingaraja Temple styles. The entrance doors on both east and west of the temple having pillars on both sides are like the elegant gateways of the Manmandir in Gwalior Fort. Ganesha and Hanuman images, representing success and power, are carved above them.

==== The statue ====
A full size statue of Sri Ramakrishna is seated on a hundred petalled lotus over a damaru shaped marble pedestal wherein the Sacred relics of Sri Ramakrishna are preserved. The swans on the front represents Paramatman. The statue of Sri Ramakrishna was made by the famous sculptor late Gopeswar Pal of Kolkata and the decorations of the temple were conceived by artist late Sri Nandalal Bose. The canopy above the deity and all the doors and windows are made of selected teakwood imported from Myanmar.

=== Swami Vivekananda Temple ===
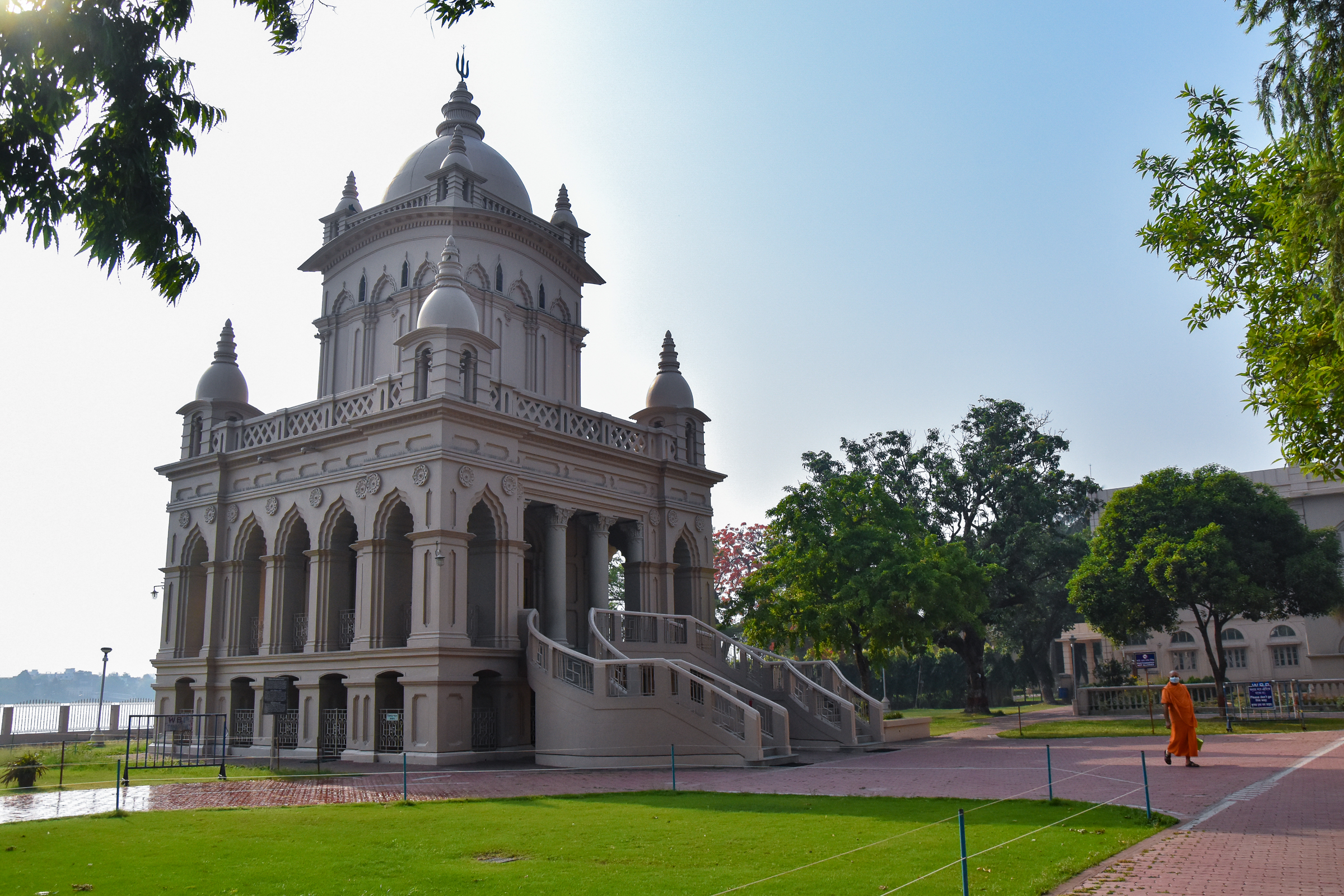
Swami Vivekananda temple Belur Math.

The Swami Vivekananda Temple stands on the spot where Swami Vivekananda's mortal remains were cremated in 1902. Consecrated on 28 January 1924, the temple has in its upper storey an alabaster OM (in Bengali characters). Beside the temple stands a bel (bilva) tree in the place of the original bel tree under which Swami Vivekananda used to sit and near which, according to his wish, his body was cremated. On 4 July 1902 at Belur Math, he taught Vedanta philosophy to some pupils in the morning. He had a walk with Swami Premananda, a brother-disciple, and gave him instructions concerning the future of the Ramakrishna Math. He left his body (died) in the evening after a session of prayer at Belur Math. He was 39. Vivekananda had fulfilled his own prophecy of not living to be forty-years old.

=== Holy Mother's temple ===
The Holy Mother's temple is dedicated to Sarada Devi, the spiritual consort of Ramakrishna. The holy mother's temple is right at the entrance of Belur Math. The temple is over the area where her mortal remains were consigned to flames. The temple of the Holy Mother was consecrated on 21 July 1920.

=== Swami Brahmananda's temple ===
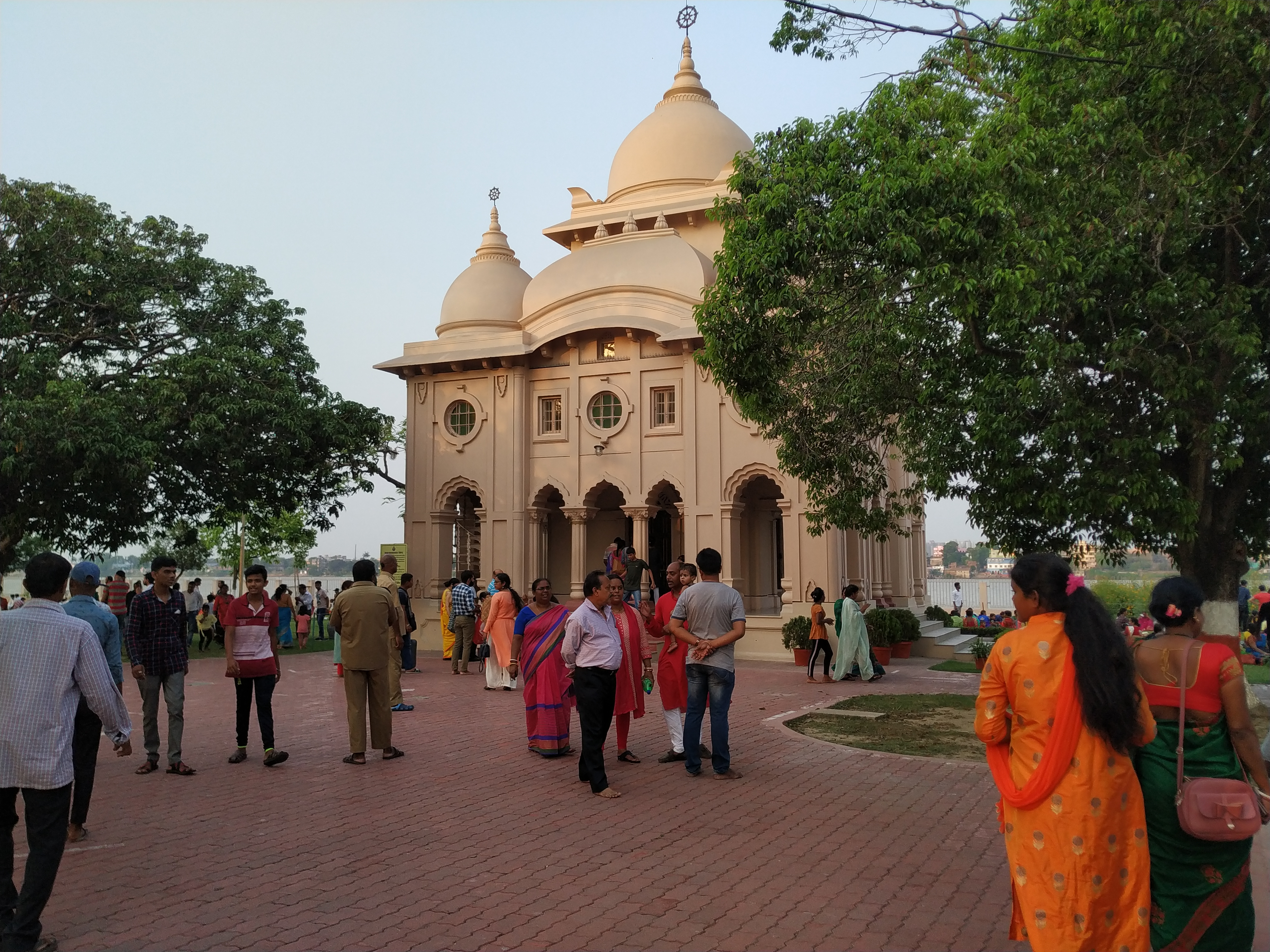
Swami Brahmananda temple, Belur Math.

Another temple dedicated to Swami Brahmananda—a direct disciple of Ramakrishna and the first president of the Ramakrishna Math and Ramakrishna Mission—is situated near Holy Mother's temple.

The temple was built on the place where Swami Brahmananda was cremated in a period of two years. It a marble image of Swami Brahmananda. Shyam Ghosh, a disciple of Swami Brahmananda, bore the expenses of Rs 40,000. Shyam Ghosh was the son of Navagopal Ghosh, a disciple of Sri Ramakrishna. Swami Shivananda dedicated this temple on 7 February 1924.

=== Ramakrishna Sangraha Mandir ===
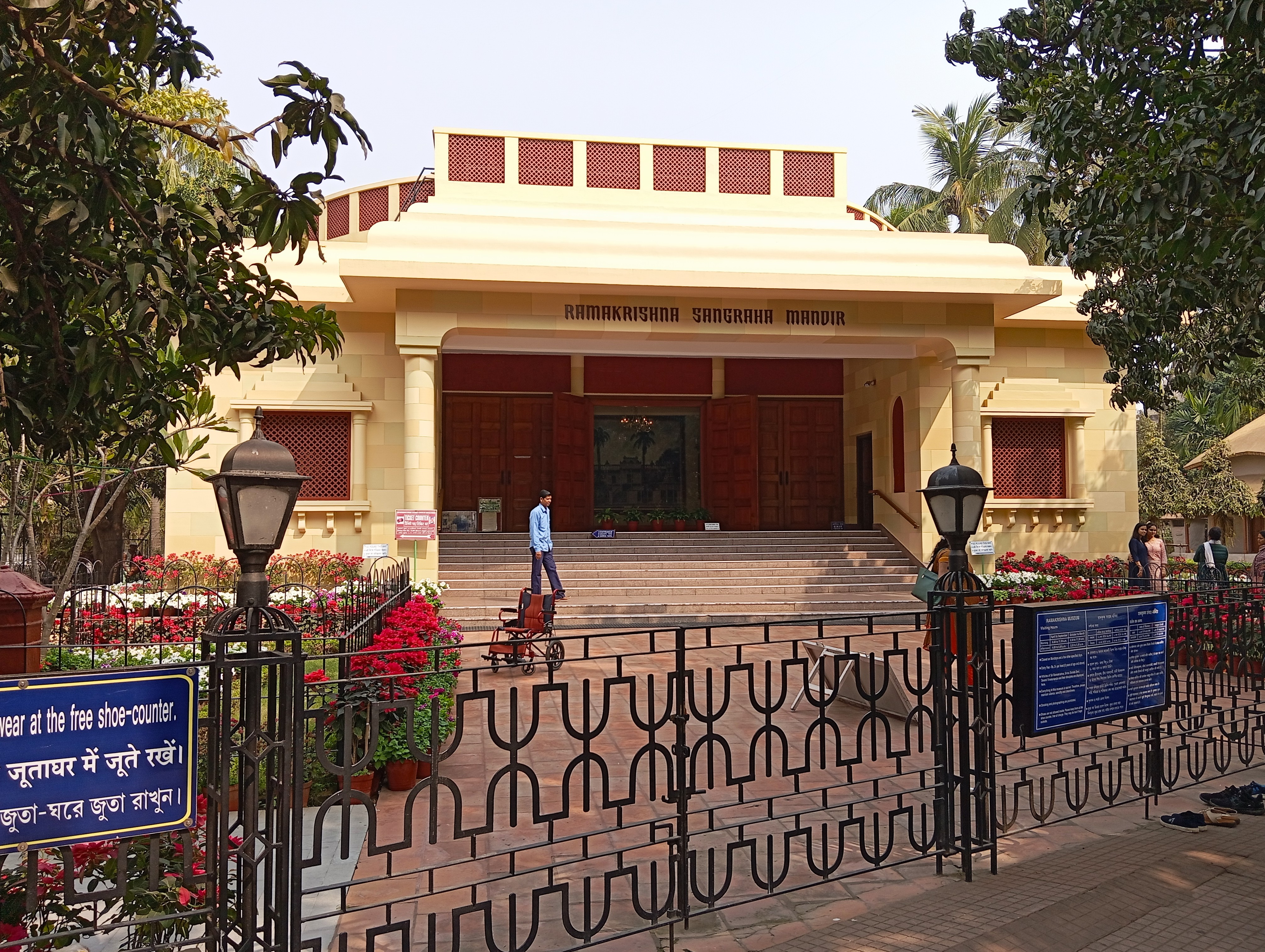
Ramakrishna Sangraha Mandir, Belur Math, West Bengal, India

The famed, two-storey Ramakrishna Sangraha Mandir hosts artifacts used by Ramakrishna, Sarada Devi, Swami Vivekananda, and some of his disciples. These include the long coat worn by Vivekananda in the West, Sister Nivedita's table, and an organ of Mrs Sevier's. The museum chronicles the contemporary growth of the movement, and the Bengalese.

The museum has a realistic recreation of the Panchavati – the clutch of five sacred trees of the Dakshineswar Kali Temple where Ramakrishna practised sadhana (spiritual disciplines). The black stone bowl from which Ramakrishna took payasam (a sweet Indian dish) during his final days, while suffering from throat cancer, and the pillow he had used, in the house in Calcutta where he spent his last few months, are on display. Ramakrishna's room in the house, where he distributed ochre clothes to 12 disciples anointing Vivekananda (then Narendranath) as their leader, has also been shown with a model of Ramakrishna bestowing grace on his disciples, and the footwear used by Ramakrishna has been put on the model. The room at Dakshineswar where Ramakrishna lived has been recreated with display of clothes and other objects used by him, the tanpura used by Vivekananda to sing to his master, and the copies of two charcoal drawings sketched by Ramakrishna are on display.

Sarada Devi's pilgrimage to Chennai, Madurai and Bangalore has also been exhibited, along with items used by her then, in 1911. The museum showcases a huge replica of Swami Vivekananda in the front of the Chicago Art Institute, where the famous Parliament of the World's Religions was held in September 1893. Alongside the same display, is a letter by Jamsetji Tata, Swami Vivekananda's co-passenger on the trip, that reveals an important and well-known work of Tata's, which was inspired by Swamiji: the founding of the Indian Institute of Science at Bangalore.

The wooden staircase and the lotus woodwork of Victoria Public Hall in Chennai, where Vivekananda gave inspiring speeches to a large congregation, have been brought over. A few displays away from this is a show on Miss Josephine MacLeod, who met Swamji in the U.S. in 1895 and served India for 40 years thereafter. She played an important role in the Ramakrishna movement. At this enclosure is a crystal image of Swamiji that was done by Paris jeweler René Lalique.

== Activities ==
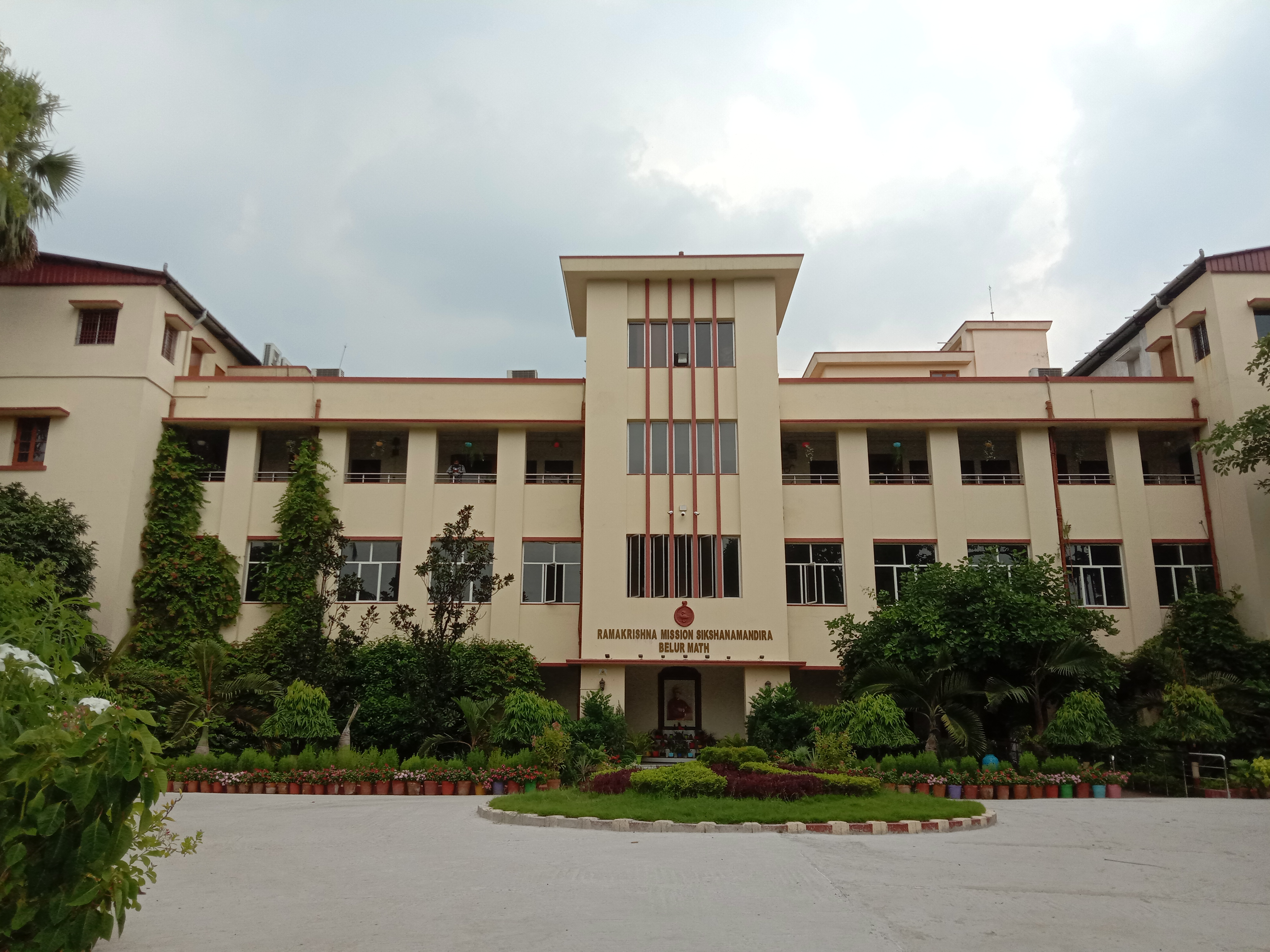
Ramakrishna Mission Shikshanamandira, Belur Math campus.

The Belur Math conducts medical service, education, work for women, rural uplift and work among the labouring and backward classes, relief, spiritual and cultural activities. The center also celebrates annual birthdays of Ramakrishna, Vivekananda, Sarada Devi and other monastic disciples of Ramakrishna. The annual celebrations of Kumari Puja and Durga Puja are one of the main attractions. The tradition of Kumari puja was started by Vivekananda in 1901.

== Visiting ==
Belur Math has been re-opened for visitors and devotees from 18 August 2021.

It was temporarily closed due to the COVID-19 pandemic, from 22 April to 17 August 2021, and earlier from 24 March 2020 to 9 February 2021, with a brief opening during the phased unlock process from 15 June to 2 August 2020, and from 10 February to 21 April 2021.

It is served by the Belur Math railway station, part of the Kolkata Suburban Railway.

== Presidents ==
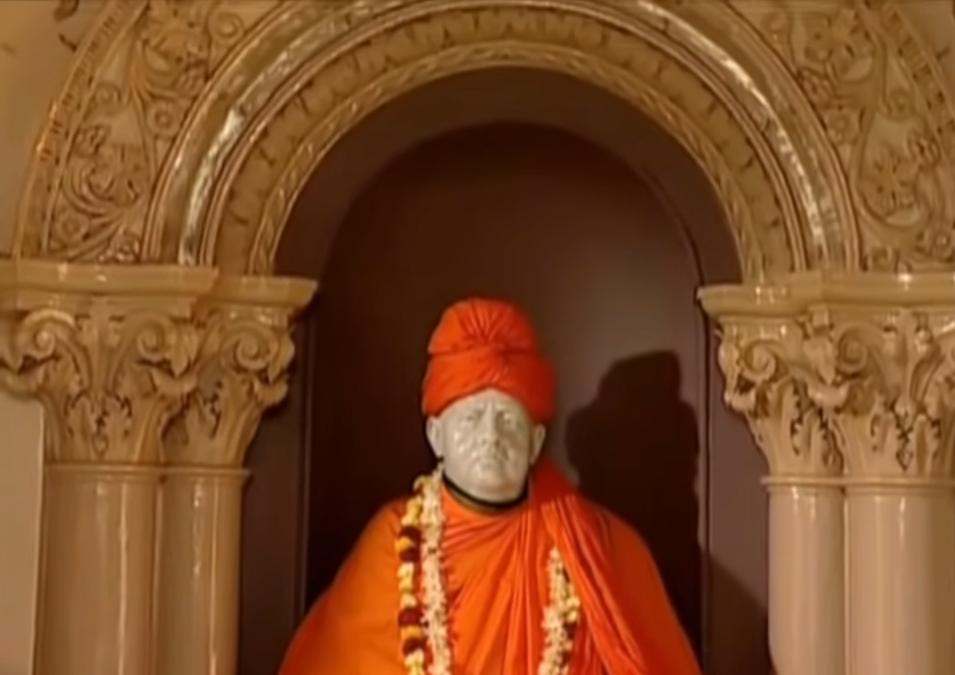
Swami Brahmananda Statue in Brahmananda Temple, Belur Math.

- Swami Brahmananda 1897–1922
- Swami Shivananda 1922–1934
- Swami Akhandananda 1934–1937
- Swami Vijnanananda 1937–1938
- Swami Shuddhananda 1938–1938
- Swami Virajananda 1938–1950
- Swami Shankarananda 1951–1962
- Swami Vishuddhananda 1962–1962
- Swami Madhavananda 1962–1965
- Swami Vireshwarananda 1965–1985
- Swami Gambhirananda 1985–1988
- Swami Bhuteshananda 1988–1998
- Swami Ranganathananda 1998–2005
- Swami Gahanananda 2005–2007
- Swami Atmasthananda 2007–2017
- Swami Smaranananda 2017–2024
- Swami Gautamananda 2024-

== Gallery ==
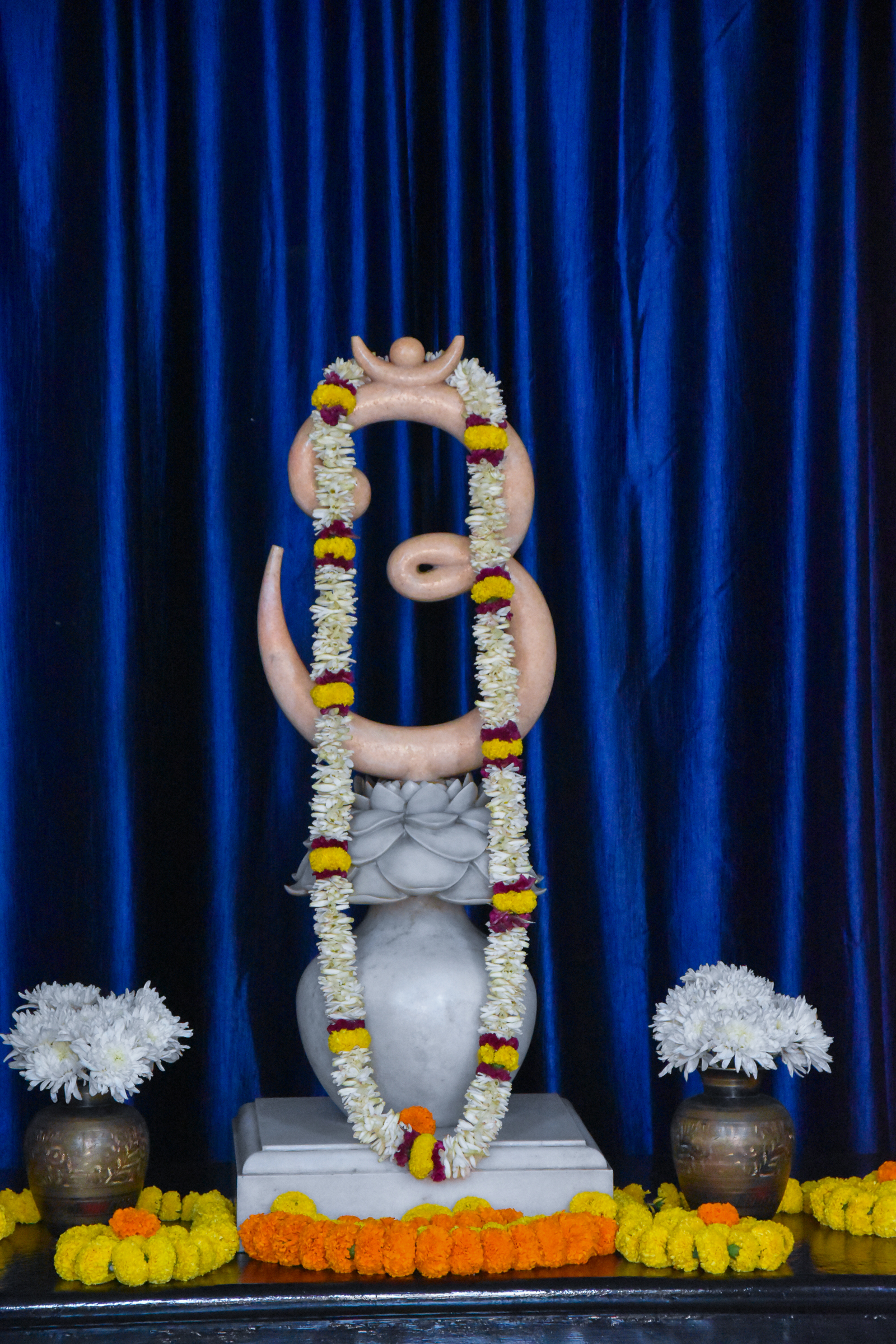
The OM (in Bengali script) in the first floor of Swami Vivekananda's temple, which was built on the place where Swamiji was cremated in 1902.

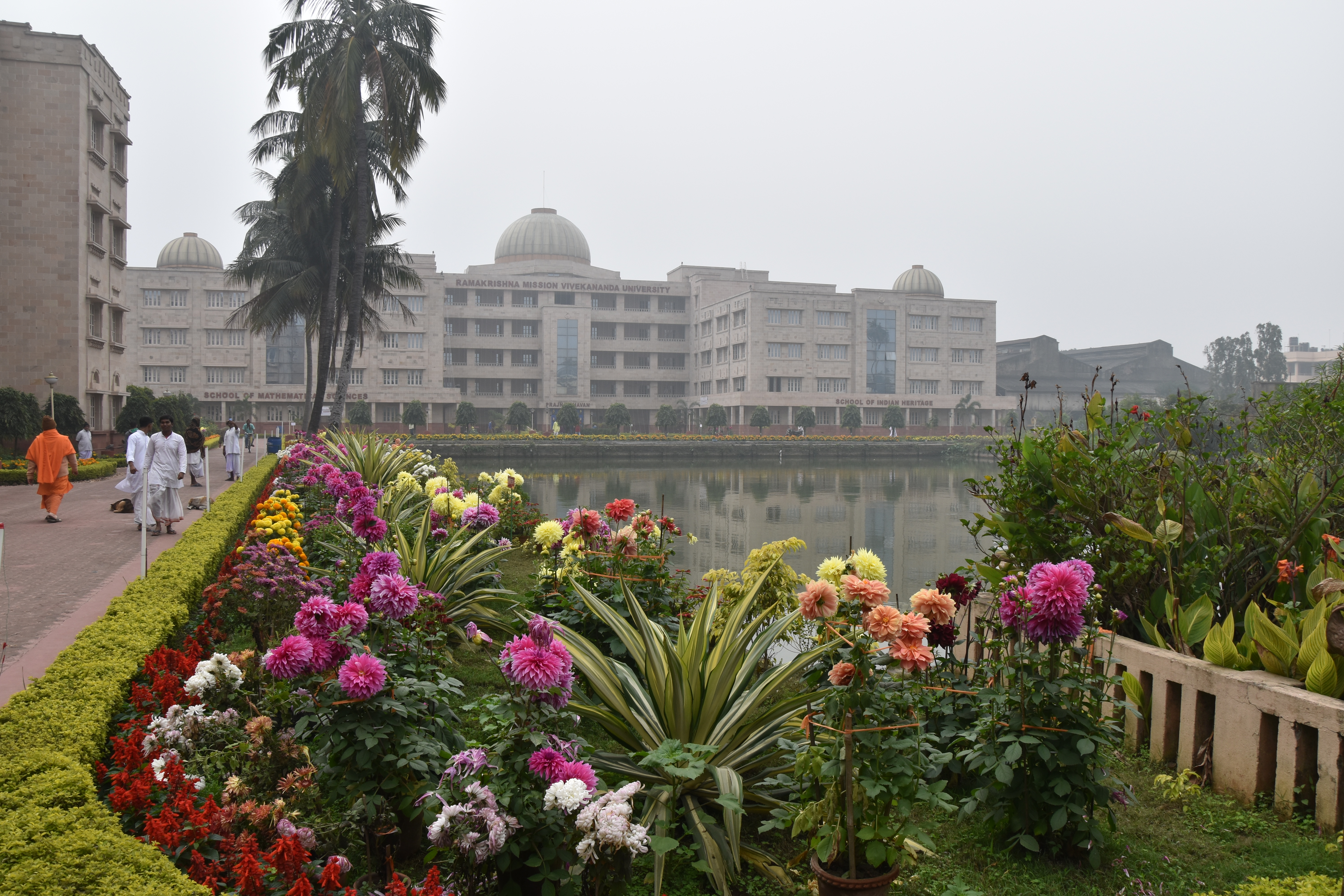
Ramakrishna Mission Vivekananda Educational and Research Institute (RKMVERI), Belur Math campus.

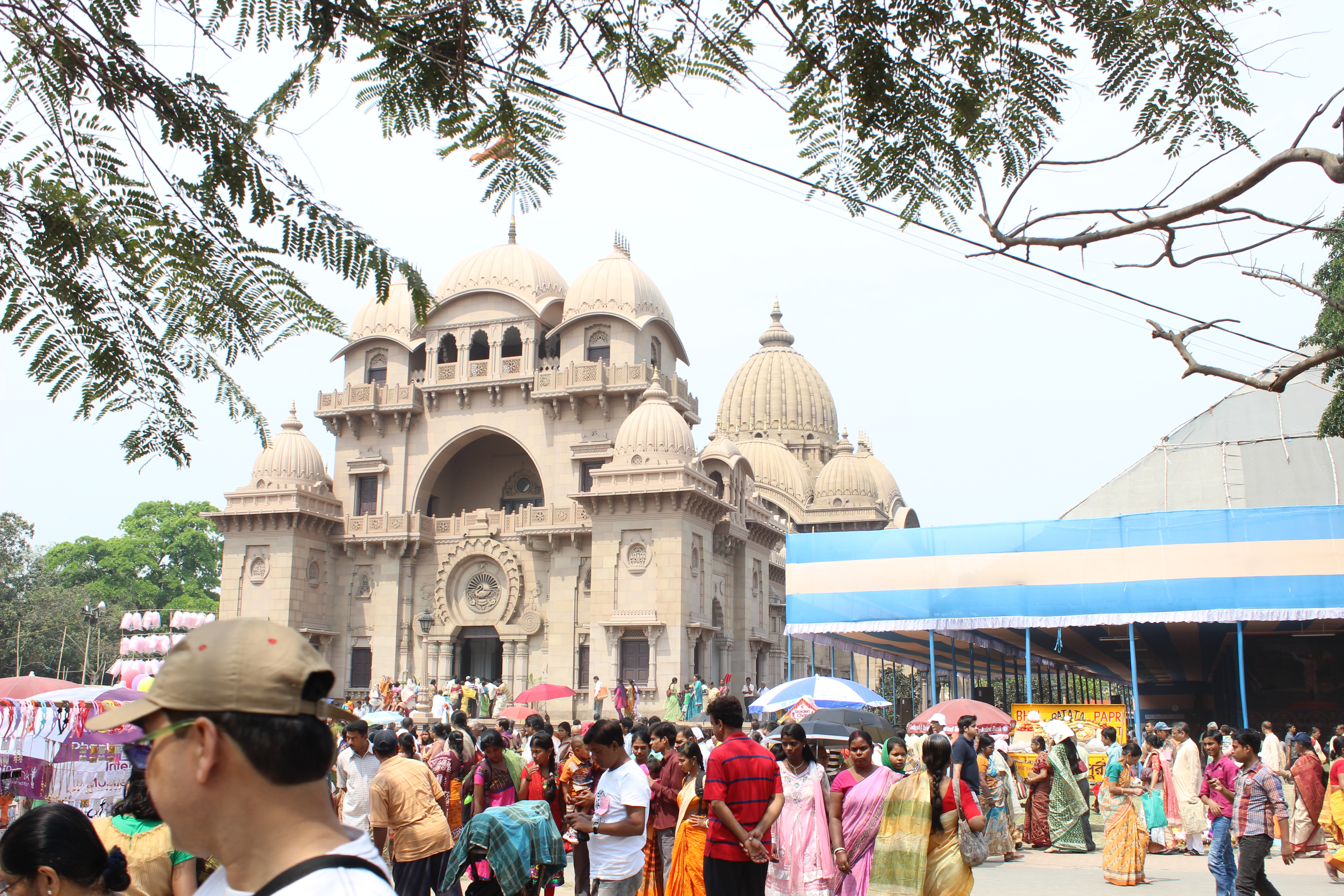
Thousands of people visit the Math for the annual day celebration.

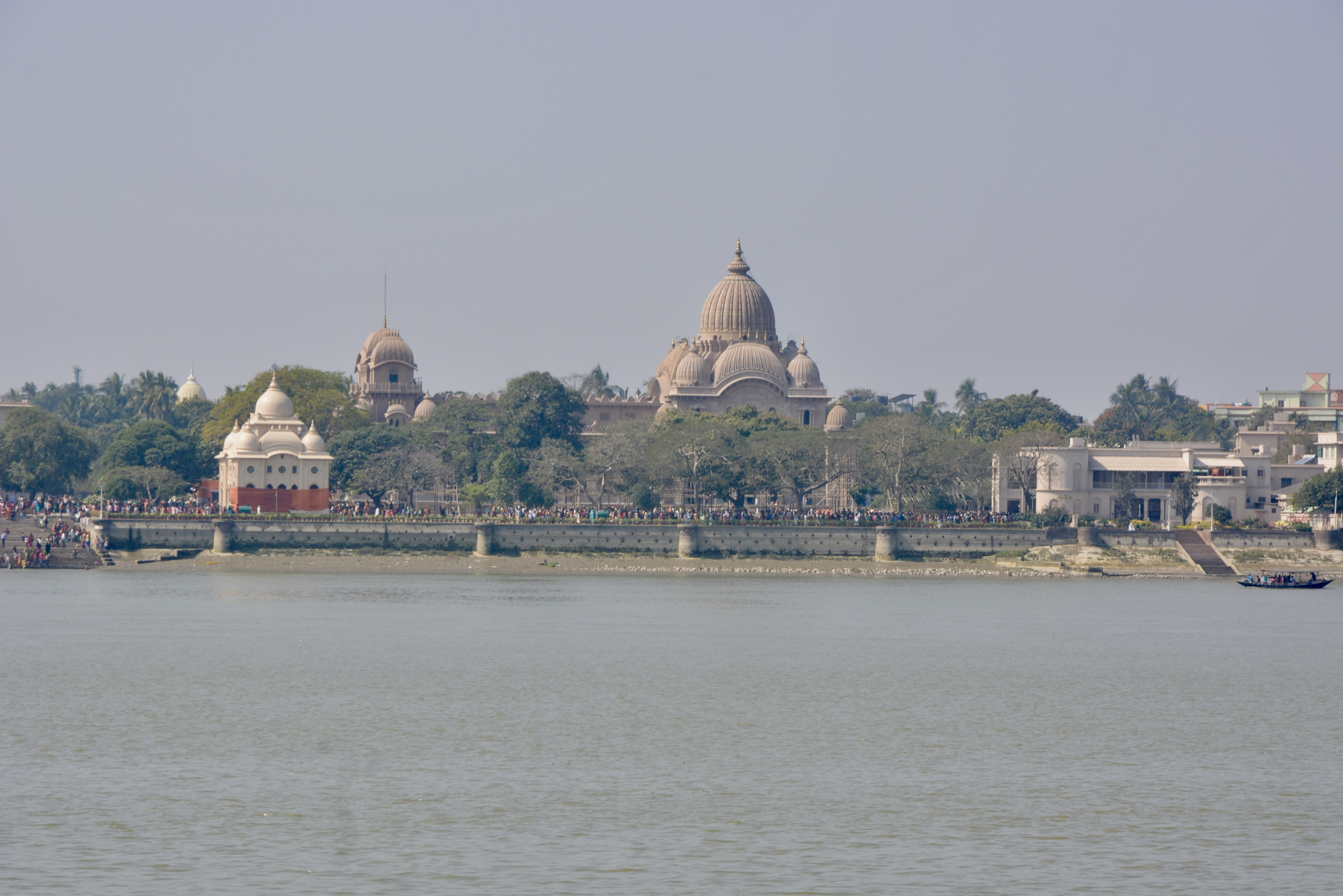
Belur Math from Ratan Babu Ghat

== See also ==
- Kalighat Kali Temple
- Dakshineswar Kali Temple
- Gazi Pir
- Baranagar Math
- Baranagar Ramakrishna Mission
