= Vishuddhananda =

Personal life
- Born: Jitendranath Rai; 1882 Gudap, Bengal Presidency, British India (now in Hooghly district, West Bengal)
- Died: 16 June 1962 (aged 79–80) Belur Math, West Bengal, India

Religious life
- Religion: Hinduism
- Order: Ramakrishna Mission
- Philosophy: Advaita Vedanta

Religious career
- Teacher: Sarada devi
- Predecessor: Swami Shankarananda
- Successor: Swami Madhavananda
- Disciples: Swami Shivamyananda Swami Suhitananda

Swami Vishuddhananda (1882–1962), born Jitendranath Rai, was the eighth president of the Ramakrishna Mission, a Hindu reformist organisation adhering to the Vedanta philosophy.

== Early life ==
From his early life, he came in contact with Sarada Devi, spiritual consort of Sri Ramakrishna and direct disciples of Ramakrishna.

== Monastic Life ==
In 1906, at the age of 24, he received his initiation from Sarada Devi and 1907 he joined the Ramakrishna Order, and he was noted for his love of solitude and contemplative life. In 1947, he became the Vice President of the Order and in 1962 he became the President of the Order for a period of three months. He died on 16 June 1962 (at the age of 80) after an operation of prostate.
