= Swami Madhavananda =

9th President of the Ramakrishna Math and Ramakrishna Mission (1888 – 1965)

Personal life
- Born: Nirmal Chandra Basu; 15 December 1888 Baganchra, Bengal Presidency, British India
- Died: 6 October 1965 (aged 76) Ramakrishna Mission Seva Pratishthan, Kolkata, West Bengal, India

Religious life
- Religion: Hinduism
- Order: Ramakrishna Mission
- Philosophy: Vedanta

Religious career
- Teacher: Sarada Devi
- Predecessor: Swami Vishuddhananda
- Successor: Swami Vireshwarananda
- Disciples: Swami Girishananda

Swami Madhavananda (born Nirmal Chandra Basu; 15 December 1888 – 6 October 1965) was the ninth President of the Ramakrishna Math and Ramakrishna Mission. He was born in the Bengal Presidency of British India.

== Biography ==
Madhavananda was born into a family of Hariprasad Basu in Baganchra, Nadia district. He was originally named Nirmal Chandra Basu.

Madhavananda graduated from the University of Calcutta with honours. During his academic years, he extensively studied the works of Vivekananda and found inspiration in the ideals and teachings of Ramakrishna and Vivekananda. He received initiation from the Holy Mother at Jayrambati in March 1909 and subsequently joined the monastery in Chennai in January 1910. In January 1916, Madhavananda was formally initiated into sannyasa by Swami Brahmananda. Later, his younger brother Vimal joined the Order, adopting the name Swami Dayananda. Swami Dayananda established the Ramakrishna Mission Seva Pratishthan in Kolkata in 1932.

Following this, Madhavananda spent several years at the Udbodhan office, where he contributed to the publication of the journal. Subsequently, he was appointed as the head of the Advaita Ashrama in Mayavati. There, he initiated the publication of a Hindi-language periodical called Samanvaya, with the assistance of the Hindi poet Suryakant Tripathi, 'Nirala'. Madhavananda played a significant role in promoting the teachings of Ramakrishna and Vivekananda in Gujarat and in establishing the Rajkot Center. Additionally, he was assigned to the United States to deliver lectures at the San Francisco monastery.

Madhavananda was appointed as a trustee of the Ramakrishna Math and became a member of the governing body of the Ramakrishna Mission in 1922. He returned to India in 1929 to serve as a Joint Secretary of the Order. In May 1938, he was appointed General Secretary, a position he held for 24 years until his appointment as Vice President in March 1962. Following the passing of Vishuddhananda, Madhavananda assumed the role of President of the Order on 4 August 1962. During his tenure as President, he presided over the Birth Centenary Celebrations of Vivekananda in 1963.

Madhavananda was known for his austere lifestyle and devoted practice of japa and meditation for extended periods. He translated various scriptures, including the Brihadaranyaka Upanishad, the Brahma Sutras, and the Bhasha Pariccheda.

Madhavananda died on 6 October 1965, at the age of 76 years and 10 months.

== Related links ==
- Ramakrishna Mission Institute of Culture, Gol Park, Presidents of the Ramakrishna Order - Swami Madhavananda
- Six Lighted Windows - Swami Yogeshananda ISBN 0-87481-410-3

== Bibliography ==
- Madhavananda, Swami (1997). Brihadaranyaka Upanishad with the Commentary of Shankaracharya. Kolkata: Advaita Ashrama. p. 696. ISBN 81-7505-102-7.
- Madhavananda, Swami (1996). Minor Upanishads. Kolkata: Advaita Ashrama. p. 96. ISBN 81-7505-104-3.
- Madhavananda, Swami (2003). Vivekacudamani of Sri Sankaracarya: Text, With English Translation, Notes & Index. Kolkata: Advaita Ashrama. p. 240. ISBN 81-7505-106-X.
- Madhavananda, Swami (1940). Bhasha Pariccheda of Vishwanath Nyayapanchanan. Kolkata: Advaita Ashrama. p. 308. ISBN 81-7505-112-4.
- Madhavananda, Swami (1972). Vedanta-Paribhasa of Dharmaraja Adhvarindra. Kolkata: Advaita Ashrama. p. 364. ISBN 81-7505-113-2.
- Madhavananda, Swami (1972). Mimamsa Paribhasha of Krishna Yajvan. Kolkata: Advaita Ashrama. p. 364. ISBN 81-7505-113-2.
- Madhavananda, Swami (1997). Uddhava Gita - The Last Message of Shri Krishna. Kolkata: Advaita Ashrama. p. 384. ISBN 81-7505-115-9.
- Madhavananda, Swami (1950). Vairagya-Satakam of Bhartrihari. Kolkata: Advaita Ashrama. pp. 60. ISBN 81-85301-94-8.
