= Vivekananda Institute of Medical Sciences, Kolkata =

Medical Institute & Hospital in Kolkata, India

Vivekananda Institute of Medical Sciences
- Ramakrishna Mission Seva Pratishthan
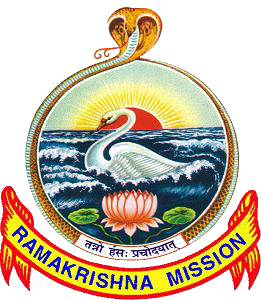
- Recognition: NMC; INC
- Type: Nonprofit Trust Medical College & Hospital
- Established: July 1932; 93 years ago (as Shishumangal Pratishthan); 1963; 63 years ago (as VIMS)
- Parent institution: Ramakrishna Mission Seva Pratishthan
- Academic affiliation: West Bengal University of Health Sciences
- Principal: Dr. Atul Kumar Gupta
- Students: Totals: MD+MS - 44; Diploma - 7
- Location: Lansdowne, Kolkata, West Bengal, India; 22°31′24″N 88°21′07″E
- Campus: Urban
- Website: www.vimsrkmsp.org

Vivekananda Institute of Medical Sciences (VIMS) is a medical institution and hospital on Sarat Bose Road, Kolkata, which functions under the Ramakrishna Math and Ramakrishna Mission. It started in July 1932 as Shishumangal Pratishthan, a maternity and child welfare clinic by Swami Dayanand, a disciple of Sarada Devi.

Swami Dayananda (born Bimal) was younger brother of Swami Madhavananda, the 9th President of the Ramakrishna Math and Ramakrishna Mission (1962–1965). In 1956, the clinic paved way for the present hospital. Today the institution runs a 600-bed general hospital, Ma Sarada School of Nursing, Vivekananda Institute of Medical Sciences, besides mobile health units and community health services for rural areas.
