= Bidhannagar =

Bidhannagar Bidhānnagar (Bengali) Salt Lake City
- Satellite city
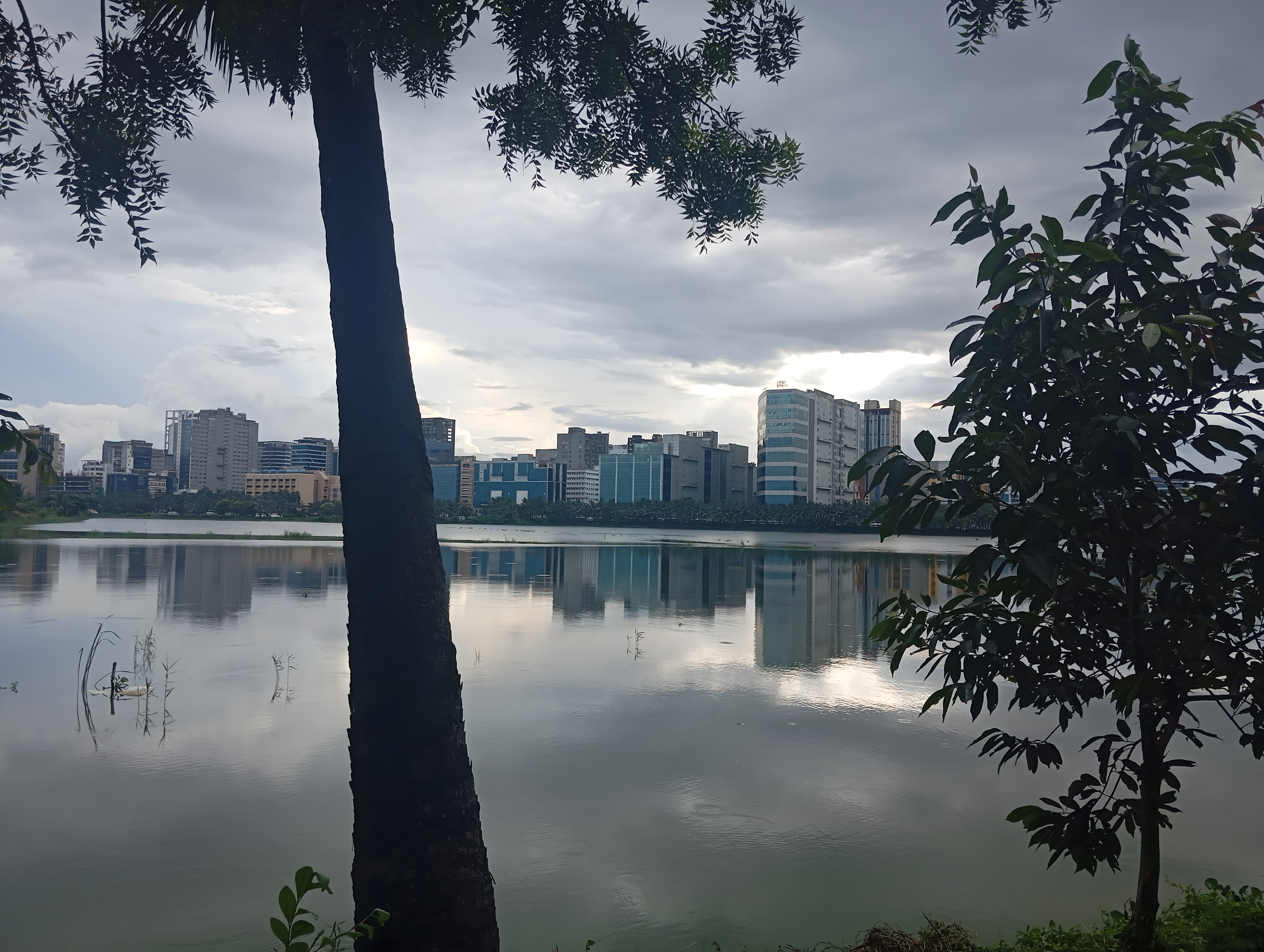
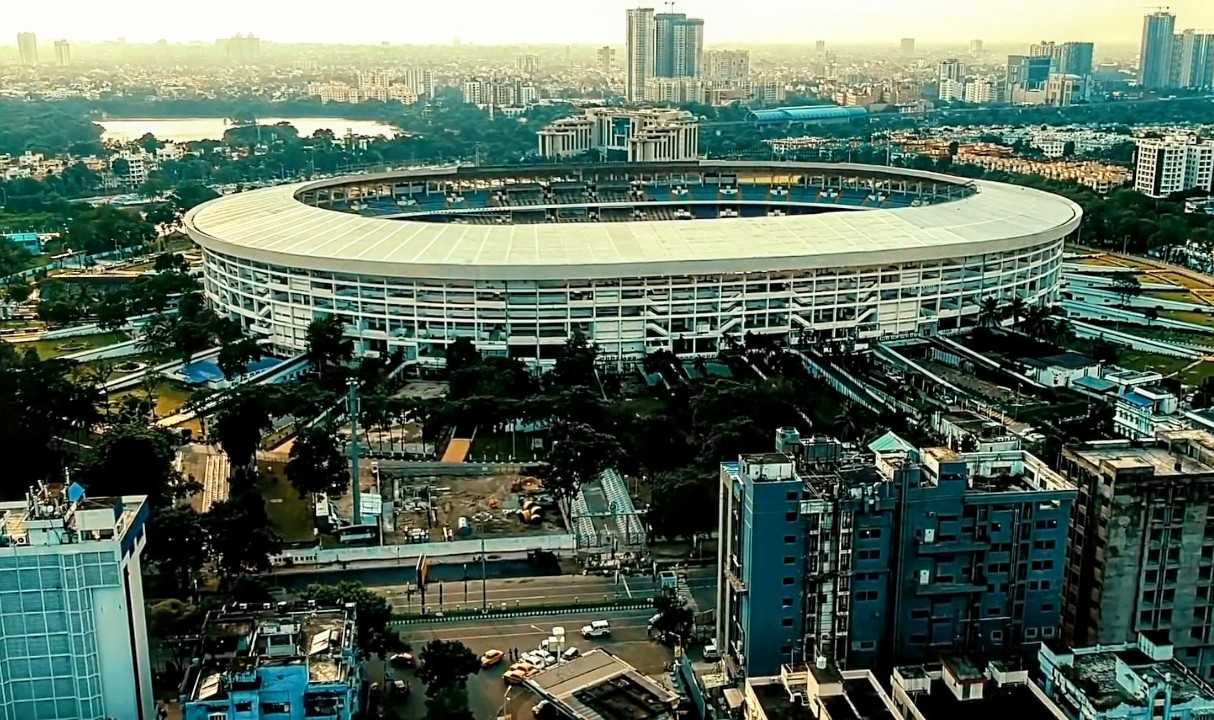
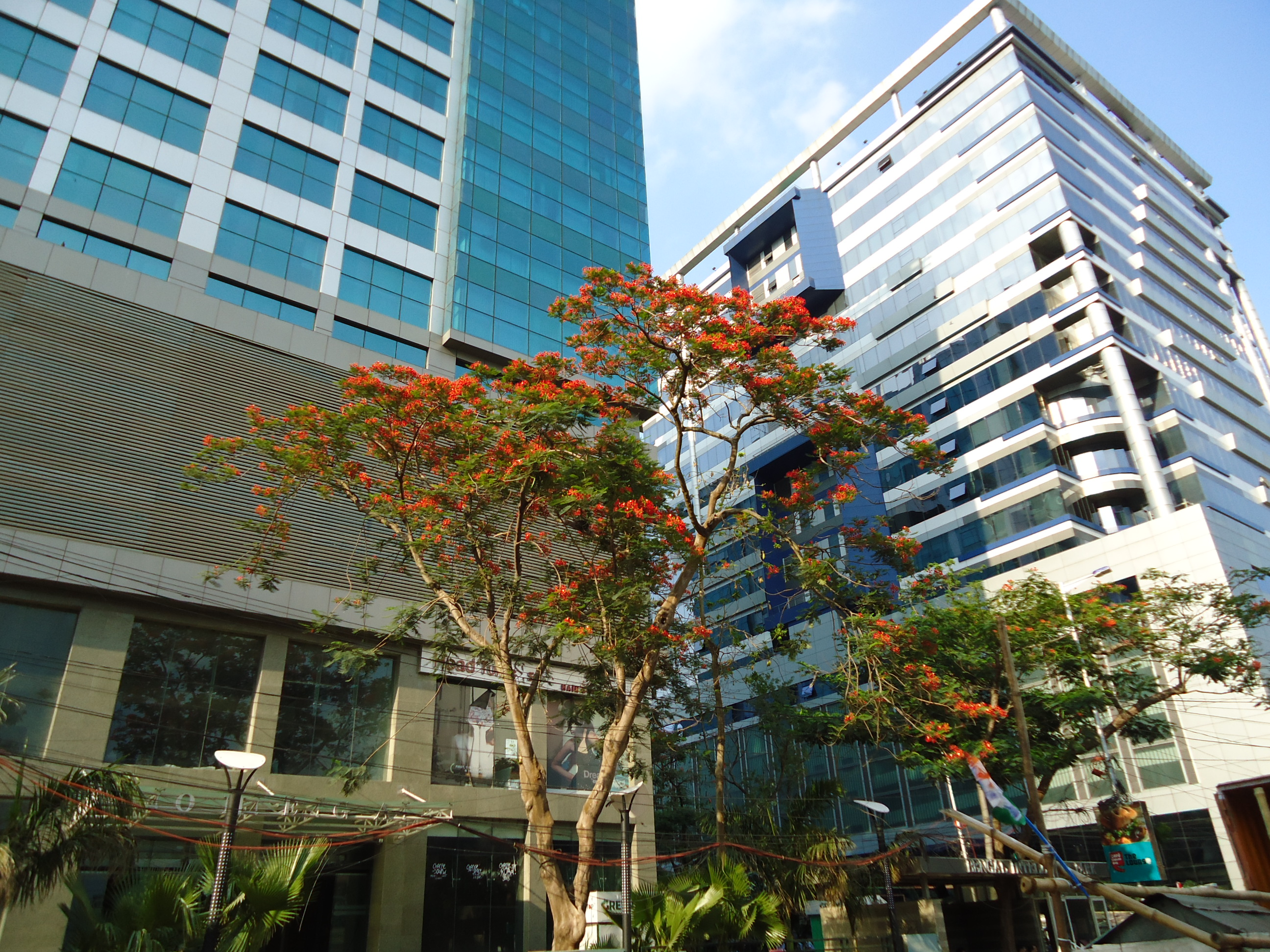
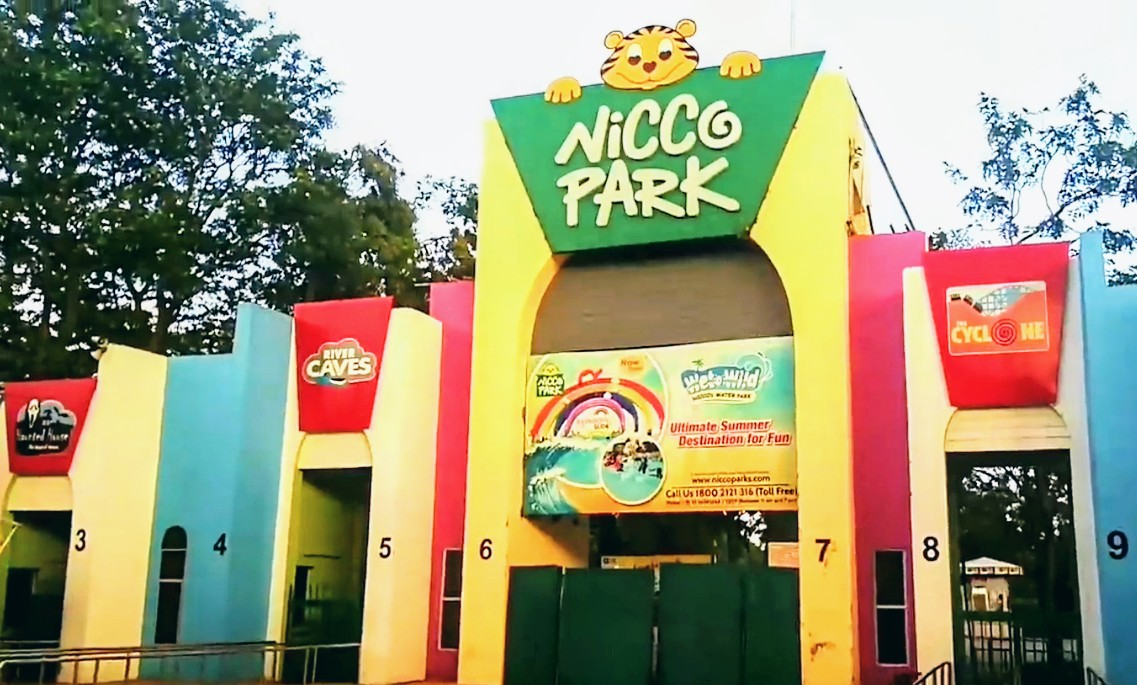
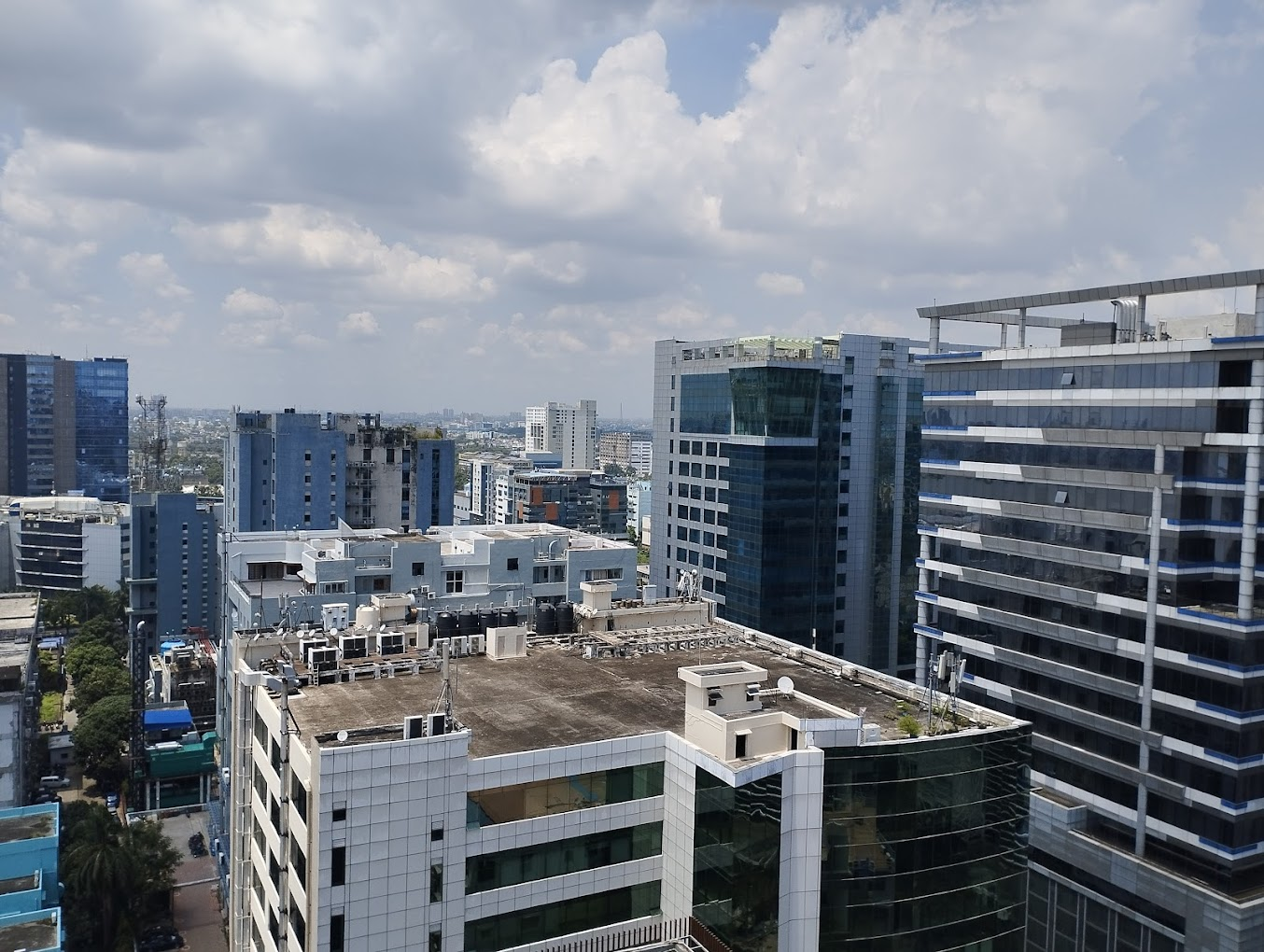
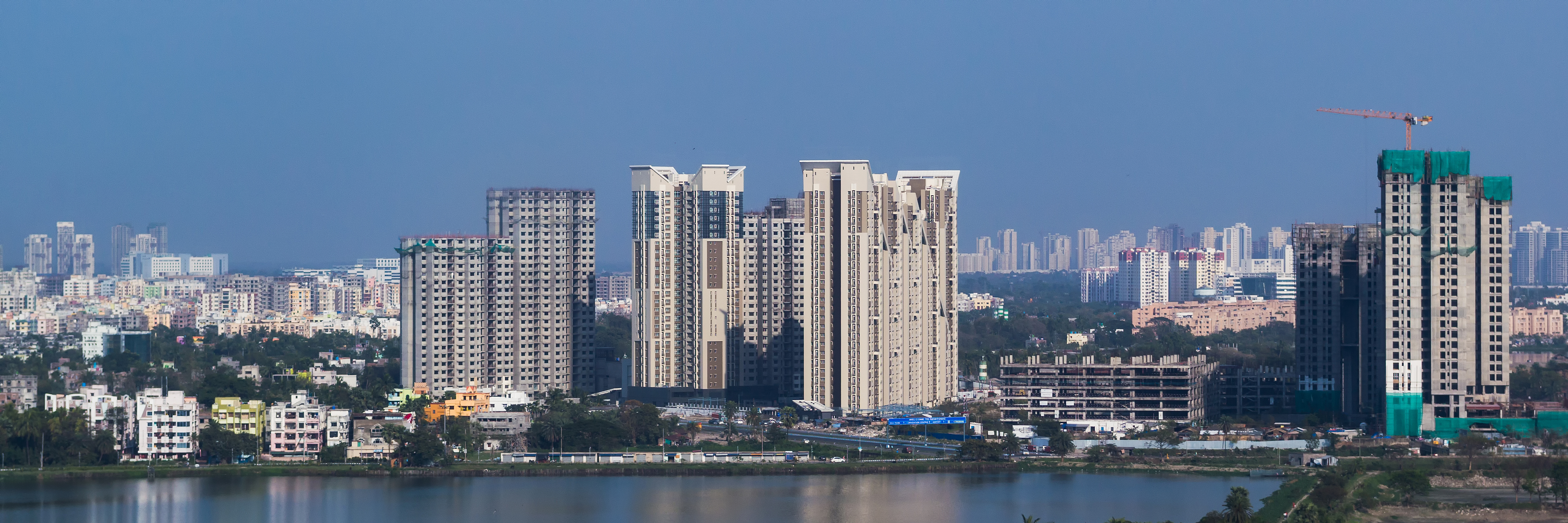
- Sector-5 skyline Salt Lake Stadium, largest football stadium in India Omega and Infinity Benchmark office buildings Nicco Park Salt Lake Sector-V View of Mahishbathan
- Interactive map of Bidhannagar
- Location in Greater Kolkata Location in West Bengal Location in India
- Coordinates: 22.58°N 88.42°E
- Country: India
- State: West Bengal
- Division: Presidency
- District: North 24 Parganas
- Founder: Bidhan Chandra Roy; Dobrivoje Toskovic (master planner and chief architect)
- Named for: Bidhan Chandra Roy

Government
  - Type: Municipal Corporation
  - Body: Bidhannagar Municipal Corporation
  - Mayor: Krishna Chakraborty
  - Deputy Mayor: Anita Mondal
  - Chairperson: Sabyasachi Dutta
  - Police Commissioner: Shri Mukesh, IPS

Area
  - Total: 55.51 km^{2} (21.43 sq mi)
  - Rank: 5th (in West Bengal)
- Elevation: 11 m (36 ft)

Population (2011)
  - Total: 634,107
  - Rank: 4th (in West Bengal)
  - Density: 11,420/km^{2} (29,590/sq mi)

Languages
  - Official: Bengali, English
- Time zone: UTC+5:30 (IST)
- PIN: 700064, 700091, 700097, 700098, 700105, 700106, 700059, 700091, 700101, 700135, 700102, 700157, 700159
- Telephone code: +91 33
- Vehicle registration: WB
- Lok Sabha constituency: Barasat, Dum Dum
- Vidhan Sabha constituency: Bidhannagar, Rajarhat Gopalpur
- Website: bmcwbgov.in

Bidhannagar, or Salt Lake City, is a planned city in North 24 Parganas district in the Indian state of West Bengal and the main IT hub of Eastern India. It is a part of the city of Kolkata and is under the municipal administration of Bidhannagar Municipal Corporation (BMC). Designed by Dobrivoje Tošković, the development of Salt Lake commenced from late 1960s onwards from reclaimed wetlands and was developed into a major IT hub for the city Kolkata by the state government through the 1990s, 2000s and 2010s. In keeping with its original name, it is commonly referred to as Salt Lake City.

It is the headquarters of the Bidhannagar subdivision and is a part of the area covered by Kolkata Metropolitan Development Authority (KMDA), located on the north-eastern side of Kolkata. The Nabadiganta Industrial Township Area and Sector V of Bidhannagar is one of the main economic hubs of the city with approximately 1,500 companies residing in Sector V as of 2021.

== Etymology ==
The city is named after Bidhan Chandra Roy, the founder of Salt Lake area of the city, the second premier of West Bengal (1948–1950) and the first chief minister of West Bengal.

== History ==
During the Salt Satyagraha, the people of Mahishbathan between present day Salt Lake and Rajarhat Newtown joined the Salt Satyagraha movement by preparing salt using indigenous methods. The main initiator of the movement was Lakshmikant Pramanik, the zamindar of Mahishbathan.

Bidhannagar's master planner and chief architect was Dobrivoje Tošković.

Bidhannagar's architecture has modern landmarks, such as the Vivekananda Yuba Bharati Krirangan or Salt Lake Stadium.

Doma Wang began working as a chef in Bidhannagar.

== Background ==
On 23 January 1948, Bidhan Chandra Roy was sworn in as the second Chief Minister of West Bengal. The most pressing problem he faced was the mass influx of refugees crossing the border from East Pakistan, which caused Calcutta's population to grow rapidly. This overcrowding led Roy to conceive a reclamation project on the marshy salt lakes to the east of the city, with the aim of relieving population pressure on Kolkata.

=== Reclamation and construction ===
The landfill project was inaugurated on 16 April 1962 by Roy, accompanied by Irrigation Minister Ajay Mukherjee and Parliamentary Affairs Minister Jagannath Kole. Roy died less than three months later, on 1 July 1962.

Reclamation of Sector I was completed in 1965, and plot distribution in that sector began the following year. Sectors II and III were reclaimed by 1969. The first residents of the township, Jitendranath Chakraborty and his family, moved into house AB 129 in Sector I on 9 March 1970. Plot distribution for Sector II began in 1979, and for Sector III in 1980.

=== Renaming ===
On 5 April 1973, a circular published in the Calcutta Gazette officially changed the name of Salt Lake City to "Bidhannagar", in honour of Bidhan Chandra Roy.

== Geography ==
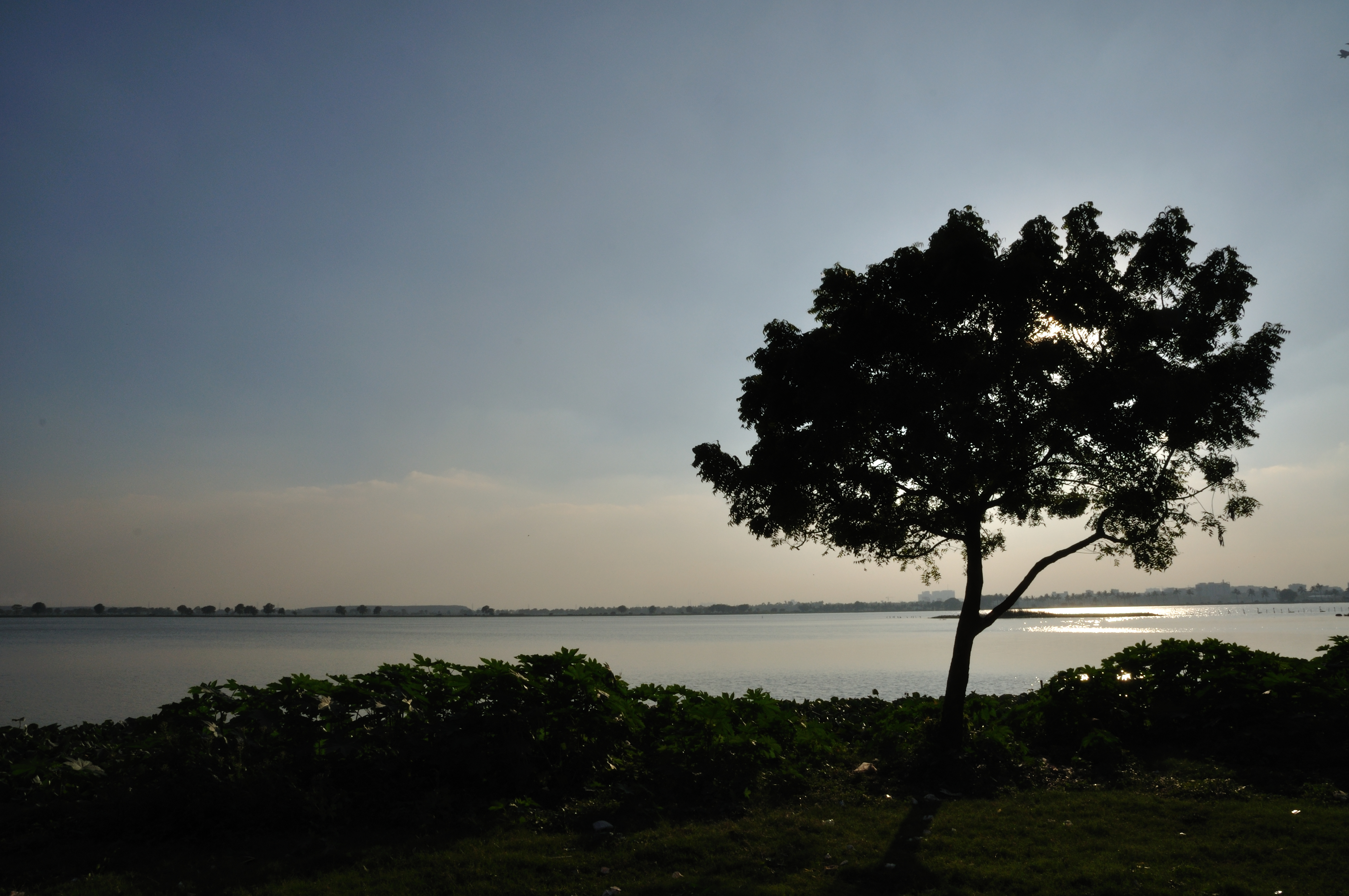
An example of the many wetlands and lakes that surround Bidhannagar

Salt Lake is located in the southeastern part of West Bengal. The city area sits within the lower Ganges Delta of eastern India. The Salt Lake area of Kolkata city was formed by land reclamation, which was done in the 1950s and 1960s to accommodate the growing population. Salt Lake is located on the north eastern area of Kolkata, the state capital; 65.2 kilometres (40.5 mi) west of Ghojadanga, a border checkpoint; and 128 kilometres (80 mi) north of Bakkhali.

According to the Bidhannagar Municipal Corporation, the city area has a total area of 55.51 square kilometres (21.43 sq mi), with approximately 30.51 square kilometres (11.78 sq mi) of it being land, and approx 25 square kilometres (9.7 sq mi), or 45.5% of the total, being covered by water. It has an average elevation of 11 metres (49 ft).

East Kolkata Wetlands, located within the city limits of Bidhannagar, lies across the southern part of the city. It is one of the two Ramsar sites in West Bengal, the other being the Sundarban Wetland.

== Education ==
=== Colleges ===
- All India Institute of Hygiene and Public Health (second campus)
- Bidhannagar Government College
- Bose Institute
- Government College of Engineering and Leather Technology
- Indian Institute of Foreign Trade, Kolkata
- Institute of Engineering and Management
- International School of Business and Media
- Maulana Abul Kalam Azad University of Technology
- National Institute of Fashion Technology
- National Institute of Homoeopathy
- National Council of Science Museums
- Institute of Health Sciences, Presidency University, Kolkata
- Rabindra Bharati University
- Saha Institute of Nuclear Physics
- S.N. Bose National Centre for Basic Sciences
- Techno India University
- Jadavpur University's Second Campus
- University of Calcutta's Technology Campus
- Unitedworld School of Business
- Variable Energy Cyclotron Centre
- West Bengal National University of Juridical Sciences

=== Schools ===
Schools in Salt Lake include:

- Pearl Rosary School, affiliated to CBSE, BK Block, near Tank 8
- Bidhannagar Government High School
- Bidhannagar Municipal School, a combined primary and high school and
- A branch of Bharatiya Vidya Bhavan, named Bhavan's Gangabux Kanoria Vidyamandir
- Salt Lake School
- Kalyani Public School near CK Market, formerly Mother International School
- Sri Aurobindo Institute of Education, near Sector V Metro Station
- Laban Hrad Vidyapith
- There are two Kendriya Vidyalayas in Salt Lake: K.V. No. 1 Salt Lake and K.V. No. 2 Salt Lake
- Apeejay School Saltlake

Catholic schools include:

- St. Joan's School
- Our Lady Queen of the Missions School
- St. Francis Xavier School

== Economy ==
Salt Lake Sector V is the largest information technology hub in Eastern India and ranks among the top ten information technology hubs in India. Colloquially referred to as the "Silicon Valley of the East", the area serves as the primary technology corridor of Kolkata, functioning as a peripheral business district governed by the Nabadiganta Industrial Township Authority (NDITA).

The sector is home to the Salt Lake Electronics Complex (SALTLEC), established in 1989 by Webel and spread across approximately 150 acres (61 ha). It became the first software technology park in the Kolkata metropolitan area. By 1999, the complex housed 160 companies across 135 acres; by 2006, this had grown to more than 170 IT/ITeS, biotechnology, and pharmaceutical companies. As of 2019, SALTLEC encompassed 63 electronic units and more than 200 IT/ITeS firms alongside numerous MSME companies.

The hub hosts the regional and national offices of several multinational corporations and Indian technology conglomerates. Tata Consultancy Services (TCS) operates major development centres managing software delivery, digital projects, and enterprise solutions. Wipro Limited maintains a dedicated Special Economic Zone campus of approximately 10 lakh sq. ft. across 20 acres in Sector V, with its Kolkata operations spanning 1.7 lakh sq. ft. and accommodating approximately 3,000 employees. Cognizant occupies approximately 2,50,000 sq. ft. at the Infospace campus, also accommodating over 3,000 employees.Other prominent occupants include Tech Mahindra, SAP SE, Ernst & Young, KPMG, PwC, Cisco, and Infosys. Collectively, IT and ITeS companies in Kolkata employ over 260,000 professionals, with Sector V serving as the primary employment centre.

Notable technology parks within the sector include Godrej Waterside (18 lakh sq. ft., established 2016), Godrej Genesis (15 lakh sq. ft., established 2014), the Wipro SEZ (10 lakh sq. ft.), Bengal Eco Intelligent Park, Infinity Think Tank, Infinity Adventz, and the Webel IT Park located at BN Block. The sector encompasses approximately 14.6 million square feet of total office space with ongoing expansions to accommodate rising demand.

Sector V benefits from strong transport connectivity, including a dedicated station on the Kolkata Metro East–West Metro line at Salt Lake Sector V metro station, direct access to the Eastern Metropolitan Bypass, and proximity to Netaji Subhas Chandra Bose International Airport. Beyond information technology, the hub supports industries including biotechnology, pharmaceuticals, and manufacturing, contributing to West Bengal's broader economic development. Adjacent to Sector V, Webel is further developing the Bengal Silicon Valley Tech Hub in New Town, aimed at attracting additional IT and telecom investments to the region.

== Demographics ==
Historical population
Year	Pop.	±%
1981	33,175	—
1991	100,048	+201.6%
2001	164,221	+64.1%
2011	215,514	+31.2%
Source: Government of India

At the 2011 census, Bidhannagar Municipality had a population of 218,323 (males 111,363; females 106,960) in an area of approximately 13.16 square km with a density of about 16,590 persons per square kilometre. However, the area of Bidhannagar Municipality was 33.50 square km (much bigger than Salt Lake City) because it includes East Kolkata Wetlands area, where very few floating people live. Bidhannagar Municipality had an average literacy rate of 90.44% (higher than the national average of 74%), with male literacy of 93.08% and female literacy of 87.69%.

== Civic administration ==
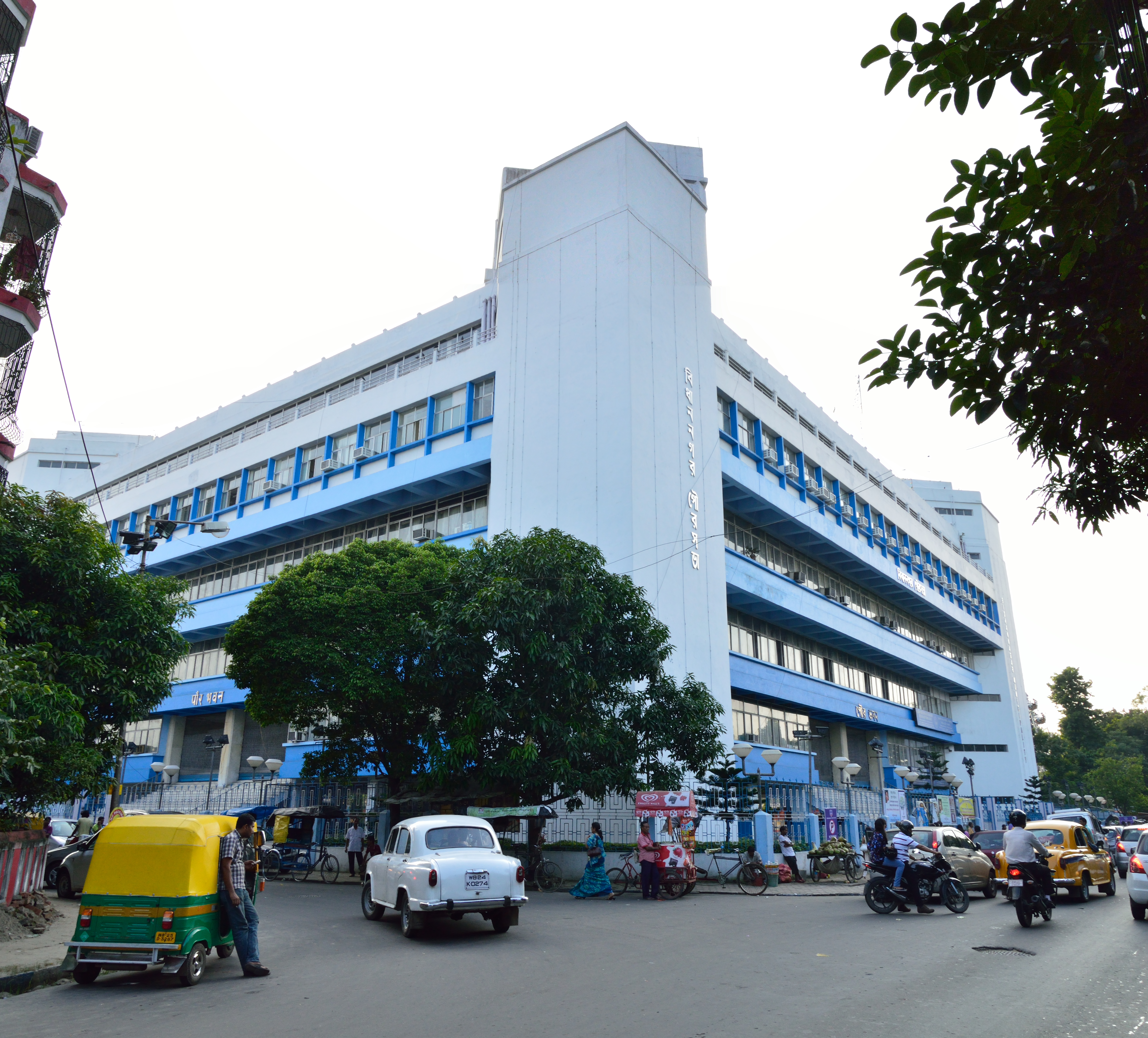
Bidhannagar Municipal Corporation

Bidhannagar is administered by several government agencies. The Bidhannagar Municipal Corporation, or BMC, oversees and manages the civic infrastructure of the city's 6 boroughs, which together encompass 41 wards. Each ward elects a councilor to the BMC. Each borough has a committee of councillors, each of whom is elected to represent a ward. By means of the borough committees, the corporation undertakes urban planning and maintains roads, government-aided schools, hospitals, and municipal markets. The functions of the KMC include water supply, drainage and sewerage, sanitation, solid waste management, street lighting, and building regulation.

Nabadiganta Industrial Township Authority (NDITA) was created in January 2006. It supplies water; maintains sewerage, roads, street signals; furnishes important buildings and collects property tax and fees in Sector - V (excluded from the jurisdiction of Bidhannagar Municipal Corporation).

=== Police ===
The Bidhannagar Police Commissionerate is responsible for law enforcement in the city area. Out of 13 police stations of Bidhannagar Police Commissionerate, nine stations are engaged in controlling law and order in the city area.

== Transport Bus Line ==
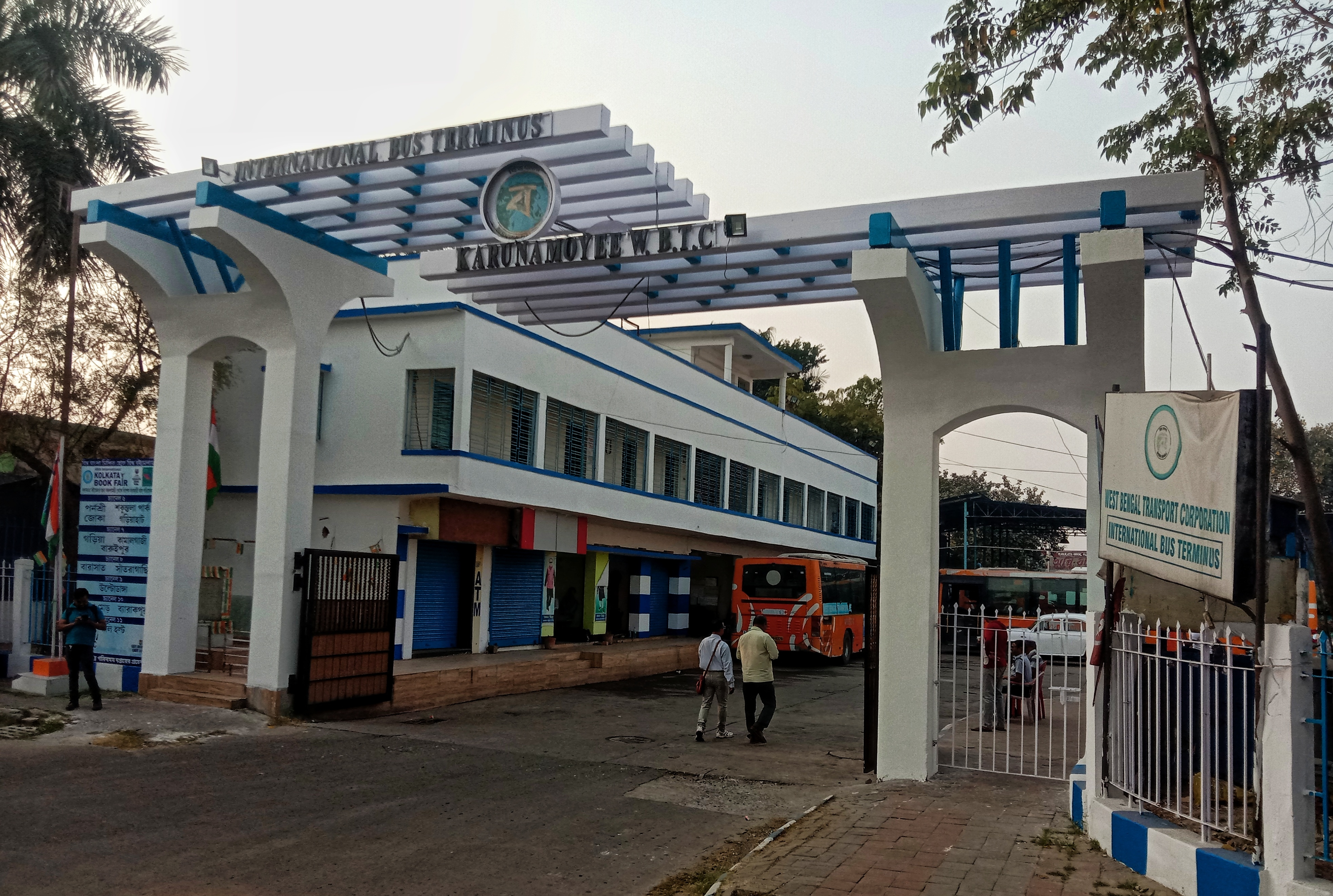
Karunamoyee Bus Terminus

Bidhannagar has a bus terminal named Karunamoyee Bus Terminus. A variety of AC and non-AC buses depart from here.

WBTC Bus

- AC-9 (Jadavpur 8B - Karunamoyee)
- AC-38 (Dum Dum Stn - Karunamoyee)
- AC-23A (Rajchandrapur - Karunamoyee)
- AC-14 (Baruipur - Karunamoyee)
- EB-12 (Barasat - Karunamoyee)
- S-22 (Shakuntala Park - Karunamoyee)
- S-46 (Rabindra Nagar - Karunamoyee)
- S-4 (Parnasree - Karunamoyee)
- S-9 (Jadavpur 8B - Karunamoyee)
- S-14 (Garia - Karunamoyee)
- S-16 (Thakurpukur 3A - Karunamoyee)
- S-23A (Rajchandrapur - Karunamoyee)
- 14A (Ramnagar - Karunamoyee)
- AC-30S (Ultadanga - Ecospace)
- S-12N (Karunamoyee - Nabanna)
- S-30A (Ultadanga - Ultadanga)
- S-64 (Naihati - New Town)

Other WBTC buses which ply on Eastern Metropolitan Bypass and Biswa Bangla Sarani are as follows:

- AC-9B (Jadavpur 8B - Ecospace)
- AC-4B (Joka Tram Depot - Newtown)
- AC-12 (Howrah Stn - Shapoorji)
- AC-37A (Airport - Garia 6 no Bus stand)
- AC-43 (Airport - Golf Green)
- AC-47 (Kudghat - Shapoorji)
- AC-49 (Parnasree - Ecospace)
- AC-4A (Parnasree - Ecospace)
- EB-3 (Tollygunge Tram Depot - Ecospace)
- EB-14 (Santragachi - Ecospace)
- EB-16 (Joka - Hatisala)
- C-8 (Barasat - Joka)
- C-23 (Dankuni - Park Circus)
- M-14 (Behala - Newtown)
- S-3W (Joka Tram Depot - Ecospace)
- S-4D (Parnasree - Ecospace)
- S-9C (Kamalgazi - Ecospace)
- S-12 (Howrah Stn - Newtown)
- S-12E (Howrah Stn - Ecospace)
- S-30 (Ultadanga - Ecospace)
- AC-37 (Barasat - Garia)
- AC-50A (Rajchandrapur - Garia)
- V-1 (Tollygunge Tram Depot - Airport)

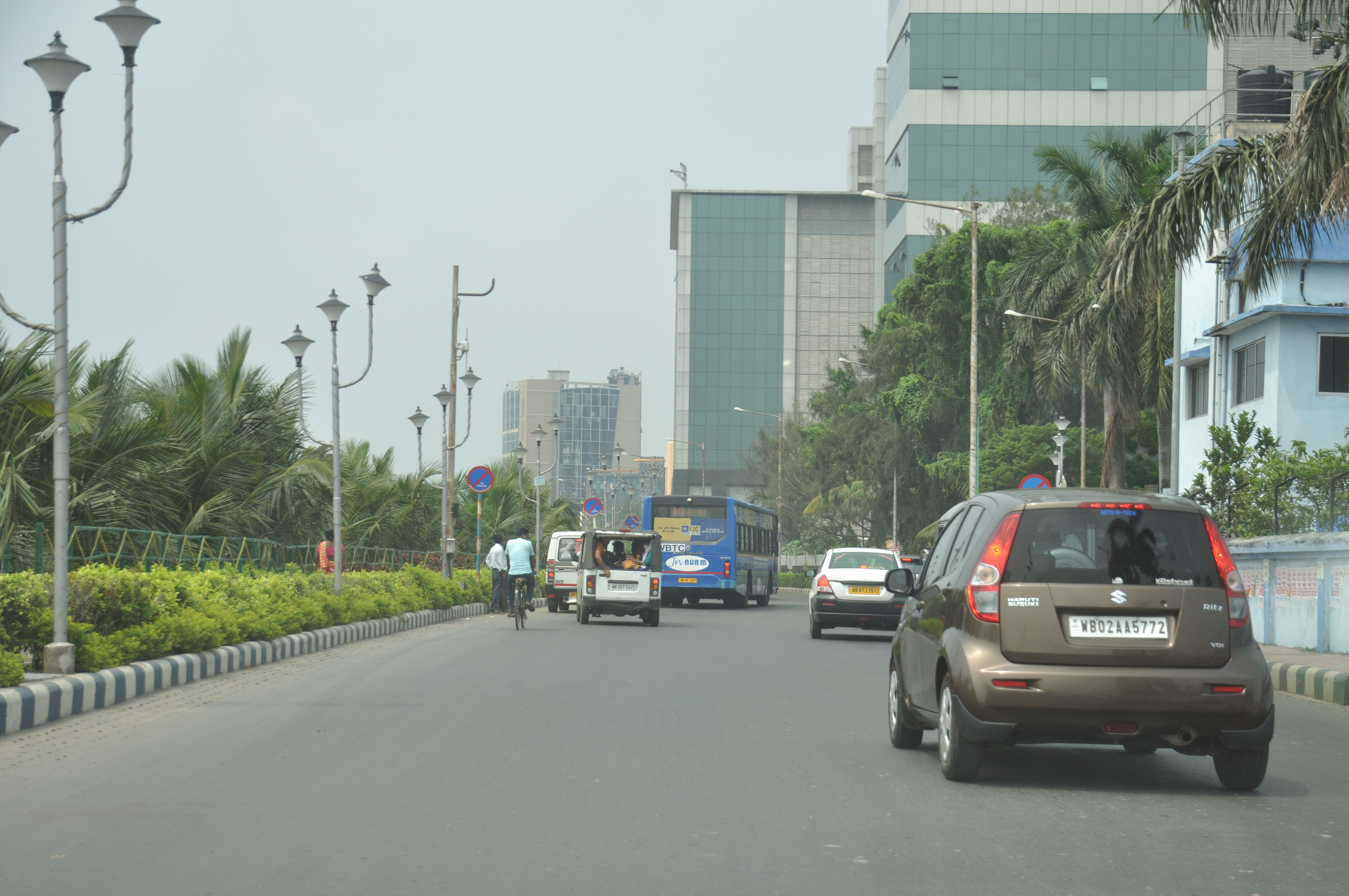
Ring road along the eastern periphery of /Salt Lake Sector-V

== Metro ==
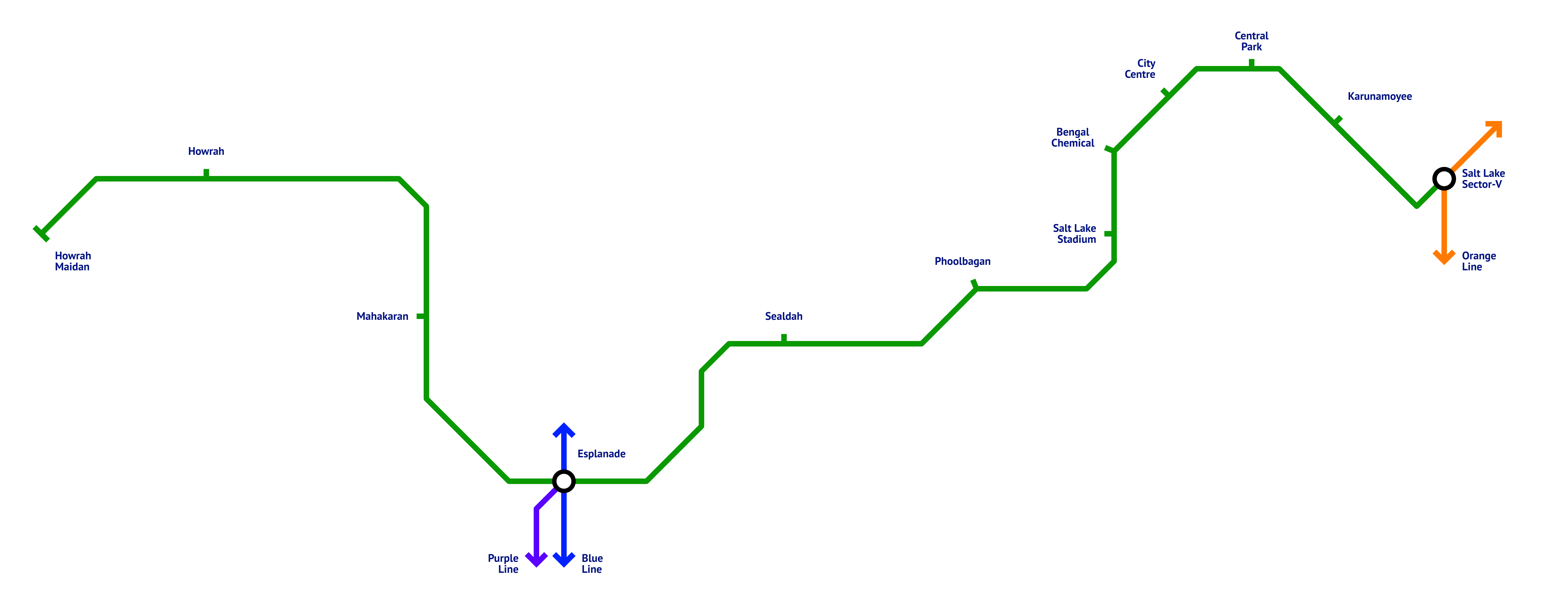
Kolkata Metro Green Line

The modes of transportation like other parts of Kolkata include air conditioned/non-ac government/private buses, Yellow taxi and other popular options like auto rickshaw and e-rickshaws. The Howrah Maidan - Salt Lake Sector V - Teghoria (Haldiram) Line (Green Line) of the Kolkata Metro is in operation since 14 February 2020, now connects Salt Lake Sector V and Sealdah. The New Garia – Dum Dum Airport Line (Orange Line) of the Kolkata Metro, which passes through the Salt Lake Bypass, is under construction with cost inflation and delays.

== See also ==
- Bidhan Chandra Roy
- Salt Lake Stadium
- Nicco Park
