= Nicco Park =

Amusement park in Bidhannagar, West Bengal, India

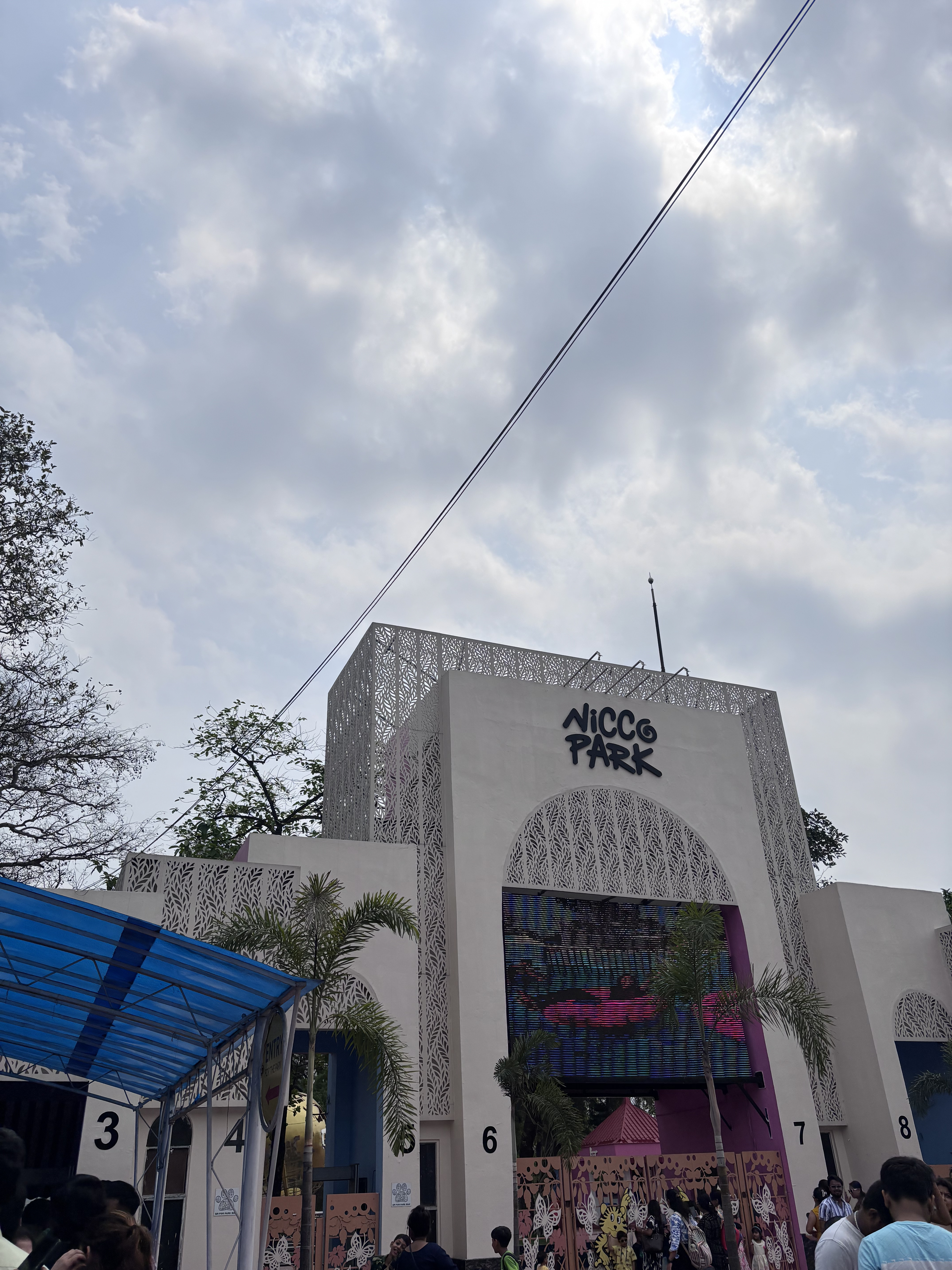
- Interactive map of Nicco Park
- Location: Bidhannagar, West Bengal, India
- Coordinates: 22°34′16″N 88°25′18″E
- Opened: 13 October 1991
- Owner: Government of West Bengal; Bandhan Employees' Welfare Trust; Angsuman Ghosh; Rajive Kaul
- Operated by: Nicco Parks and Resorts Limited (NPRL)
- General manager: Rahul Singh
- Theme: Amusement park
- Operating season: 364 days (11.00 A.M. to 9.00 P.M. in Summer) and 11.00 A.M. to 8.00 P.M. in Winter) (closed on Holi)
- Attendance: 1.5 million
- Area: 40 acres (0.16 km^{2})
- Website: Official website

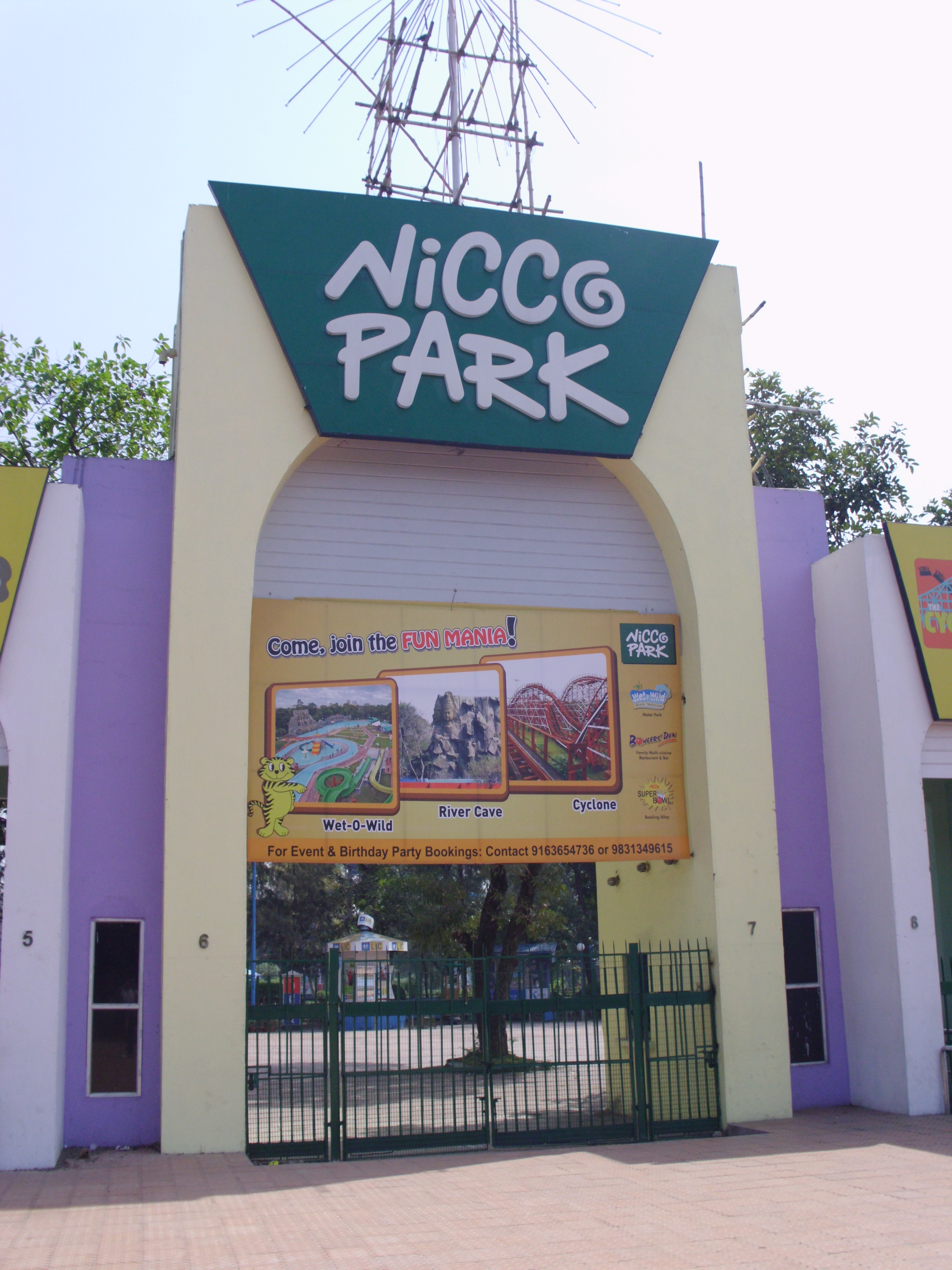
The main entrance gate of Nicco Park, Jheel Meel, Kolkata

Nicco Park is an amusement park located in Jheel Meel, Sector - IV of Bidhannagar, West Bengal, India. The park was created to attract tourists to the state by providing family-friendly recreation as well as educative entertainment. Nicco Park opened on 13 October 1991 and has since been referred to as the Disneyland of West Bengal. Presently, the 40-acre park is home to over 35 different attractions and has served over 24 million customers. Nicco Park also provides a "green" environment.

== History ==
=== Concept and construction ===
The concept of an amusement park in the Kolkata region began with the 300th anniversary of the recorded founding of Kolkata (then Calcutta). While planning was under way for the tricentennial celebrations by the ruling State Government, Rajive Kaul, the current Chairman of Nicco Group, was in the US on a family holiday to Disneyland. As per the story, when Kaul returned, there was an inquiry as to why he left for America when he was very much required back home for the planning process. Supposedly, Rajive replied, "I'd gone to see if I could create a Disneyland here." What at first seemed to be just an excuse to justify his absence actually materialized to a joint venture with the West Bengal government.

=== Joint venture ===
After the inception of the idea, the Government of West Bengal along with Rajive Kaul followed through with their commitment to build an amusement park in Kolkata.They purchased the land from Subhas Chakraborty who was the owner of the previously existing Jheelmeel Park.They set up the company Nicco Parks & Resorts Ltd. (NPRL) which was a Joint Sector Company between National Insulated Cable Corporation Ltd. (now, Nicco Corporation Ltd.) representing the private sector and the Government of West Bengal represented by West Bengal Industrial Development Corporation Limited (WBIDC) and West Bengal Tourism Development Corporation Limited (WBTDC) on 17 March 1989. The Certificate of Commencement of Business was obtained on 31 March 1989. The primary function of the company was to construct an amusement part in the outskirts of Kolkata, which would be owned and maintained by Nicco Parks and Resorts Limited (NPRL). The project had additional input in the form of technical advice from Blackpool Leisure & Amusement Consultancy Ltd., U.K.

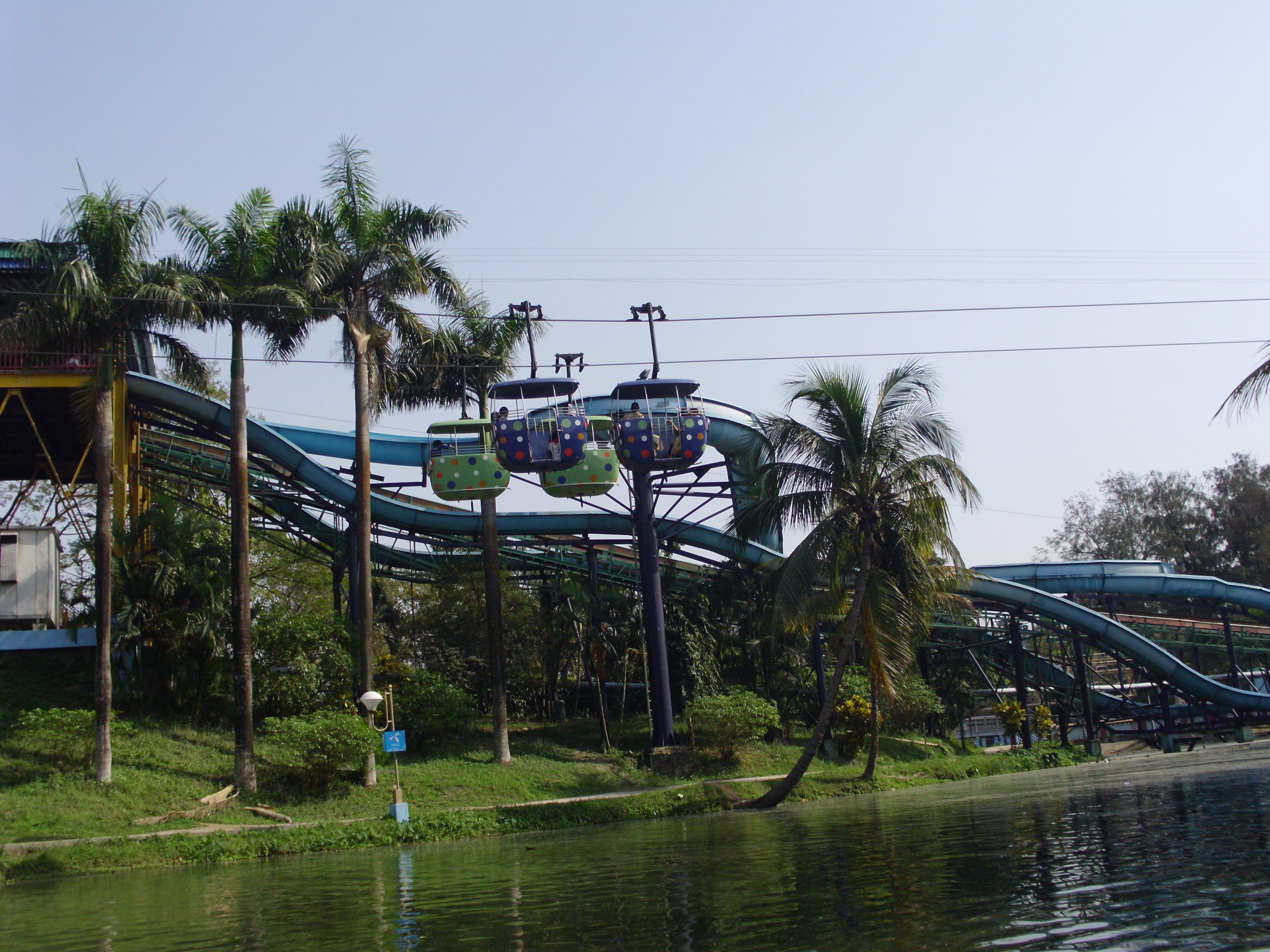
The lake in the park

Rajive Kaul sought financial help from Geoffrey Thompson, the then-owner and managing director of the Pleasure Beach, Blackpool. Thompson, however, only offered the assistance of Blackpool Leisure & Amusement Consultancy Ltd provide technical expertise, including surveying the land and suggesting design and safety matters. The idea of the River Caves at Nicco Park was taken by Kaul from Thompson's Blackpool, and a few years later Kaul offered to renovate the ones there recognizing the superiority of the ones at Nicco Park, Kolkata. Thompson accepted the offer.

Two years after the conception of NPRL, and at a total cost of about rupees 8 crores, Nicco Park opened with 13 rides. It also took over the toy train from the previous Jheelmeel park, owned by Subhas Chakraborty and improved greatly upon it, providing for a tour of the whole park for passengers.

== About the park ==
=== Educational recreation ===
Nicco Park's educative recreational initiative is the concept that families should not only have a fun-filled experience but also must have learned something during their time at the park. The grounds were designed to provide for educational recreation, and are dotted with displays. The entrance of every ride offers explanations of the scientific principles behind the working of the rides. The park's Solar Energy village has been set up to demonstrate the functions of various non-conventional energy sources in community life. In keeping with its green theme, a greenhouse is also run by the Indo American Hybrid Seeds Ltd. selling various types of plants.

=== Park Timings ===
| Main Park Opens at | 10:30 AM |
| Ride Starts at | 10:45 AM |
| Ride Ticket Booth opens at | 10:45 AM |
| Food Park Opens at | 11:00 AM |
| Entry to Main Park Closes at | 6:30 PM |
| Ride Closes at | 7:30 PM |
| Food Park Closes at | 8:00 PM |

The ticket counters generally start right on time, but all the rides may not begin at 10:45 AM. People generally come here by 11 AM and it gets crowded gradually.

=== Rides and attractions ===
Nicco Park has approximately thirty-five rides that include the Toy Train, Tilt-a-Whirl, Striking Cars, Paddle Boat, Water Chute, Water Coaster, Flying Saucer, Pirate Ship, River Caves, Cyclone and Moonraker. The Giant Cyclone, added in 2003, is among Asia's largest. The ride 750 meters in length, has seven drops and goes as high as 55 feet.

Attractions such as the park's cable cars and Eiffel Tower provide panoramic views of the park from above. Natural attractions include a rose garden and a forty feet high waterfall.

A decommissioned MIG-21 fighter aircraft from the Bagdogra Airbase is on display at Nicco Park, serving as an attraction with educational value. It was a gift from the Eastern Air Command in 2008.

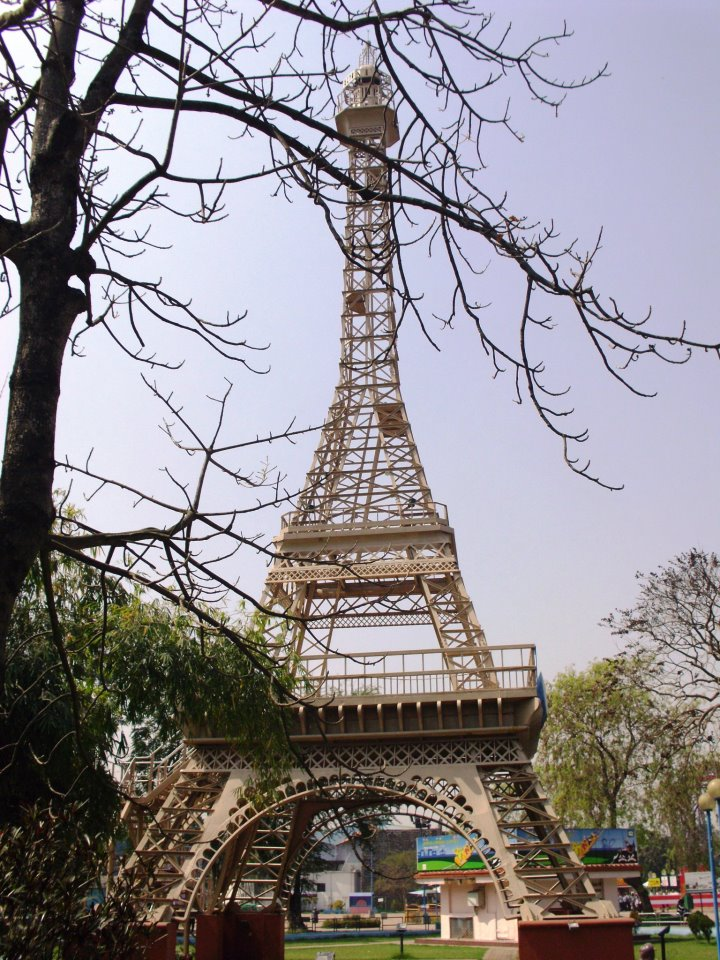
The Eiffel Tower exhibit in Nicco park

There is a large food park selling North Indian, Bengali, South Indian and Chinese fast food, and kiosks run by various restaurants of Kolkata. Sheroo Bazar and Souvenir Shop Wet-O-Wild are places where one can buy accessories such as T-shirts, coffee mugs and keychains.

Nicco Park has undergone expansions throughout its existence.

The park has also constructed a water park, Wet-O-Wild, inside the amusement park. There are also rain dance performances. The park also has a 4-D movie theater. It has also introduced a new ride called Sky Diver which has been attracting visitors for the past two years now.

A bowling alley with restaurant and bar also exist within the park. Venues such as Octagon host corporate and non-corporate events.

=== Nearby attractions ===
Adjacent to the park is the Nalban Boating Complex, offering boat tours in paddle boats, hovercraft or shikaras. Well maintained groves surround the four hundred acre lake.

Salt Lake Stadium is also nearby. Opposite to the Salt Lake Stadium is the Subhash Sarovar, one of the two man made lakes of Kolkata. Though anthropogenic activities around the lake such as washing of clothes and dumping of wastes has led to its deterioration, the tourism development corporation has taken up the responsibility for the beautification of the lake (2010).

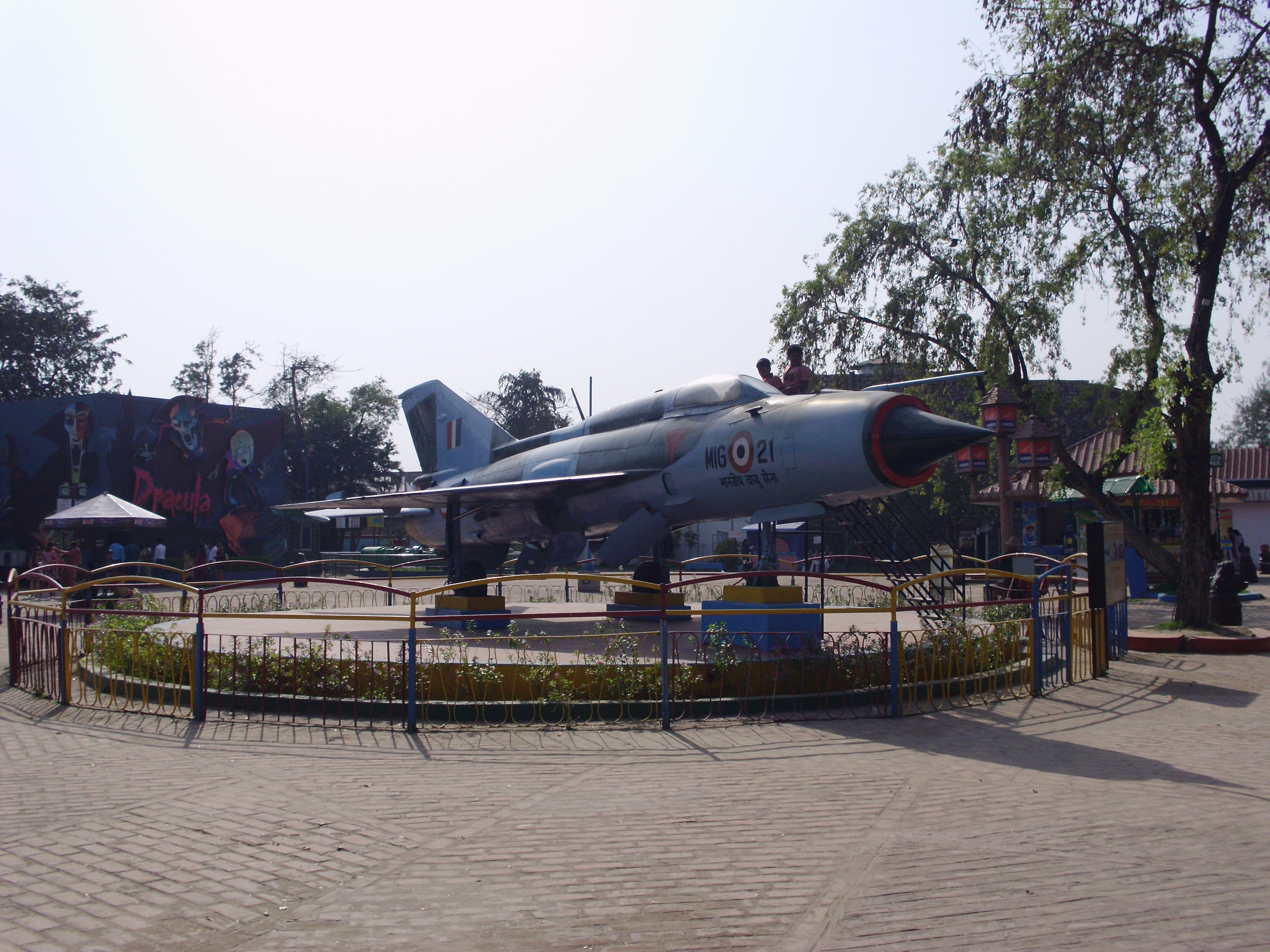
A decommissioned MIG-21 fighter aircraft on display

Nicco Parks and Resorts Limited (NPRL) have also diversified the park and as such Nicco parks (Jheel Meel) have been opened at neighbouring states Odisha in Bhubaneswar in December 1998 and at Jharkhand in Jamshedpur in June 2001. A composite park has also been set up in the neighbouring country of Bangladesh in Dhaka in 2003. Recently there has also been a Memorandum of Understanding signed between NPRL and Intraco Group in order to set up a water park at a sea resort of Cox's Bazar at Chittagong, Bangladesh.

== Reception ==
The amusement park has received favourable responses from both the public and the government as well as various corporate bodies. ITC Limited, TISCO, Britannia Industries, Bata, Nestle, Smith Kline Beecham, Union Carbide, Dunlop, ANZ Grindlays, Duncans, Goodricke as well as Cadburys are among those which have invested in the park by sponsoring rides and other attractions.

=== Awards, certifications and recognition ===
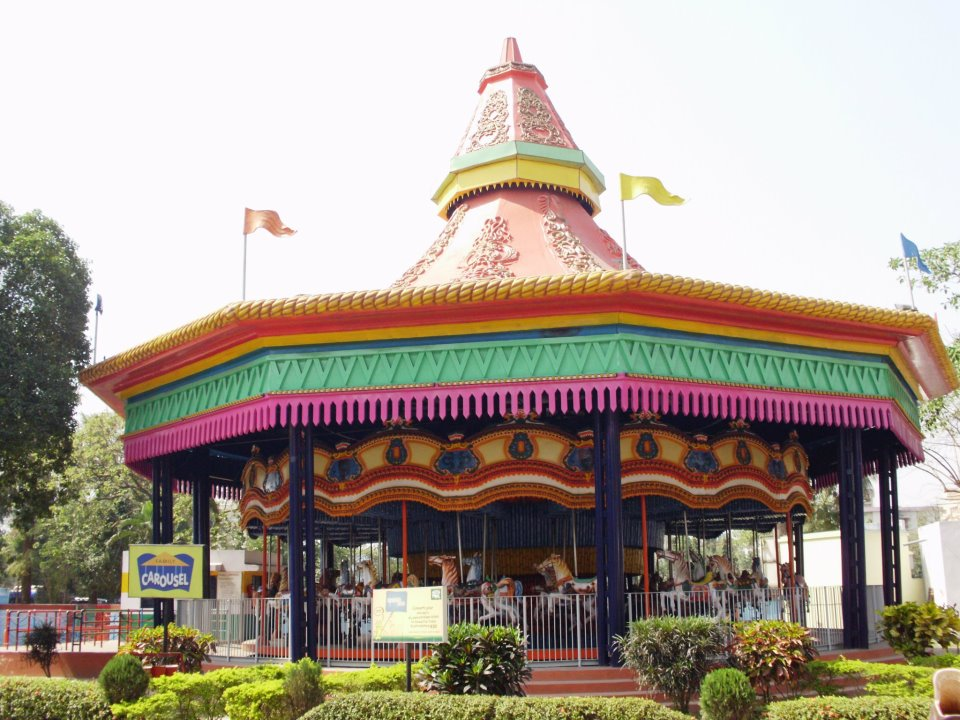
The carousel ride in Nicco park

Nicco Park has received various awards in the 20 years since its inception. Among its attractions, The Giant Cyclone has been awarded the 'Best Indigenously Manufactured Ride' of 2006-07 by the Indian Association of Amusement Parks and Industries, which also awarded Nicco Park's River Caves as the 'Most Innovative and Popular Ride' of 2009–10.

Nicco Park is the first amusement park in India to be able to obtain the ISO 9001 (Quality Management System), ISO 14001 (Environment Management System) and the OHSAS 18001 (Safety Management System) certifications. The park also states that it is the first amusement park in the world to obtain ISO 9002 certification from a European Certifying Authority. It has also received the "ICC Corporate Excellence Award". The Indian Association of Amusement Parks & Industries have declared the River Caves at Nicco Park as the most popular ride and innovative ride of 2010.

The SA 8000 (Social Accountability) certificate which they received from DNV on 14 December 2008, makes Nicco Park the first amusement park in India to receive the certification. It is also reported that they are the first amusement park in the world to receive the honour.

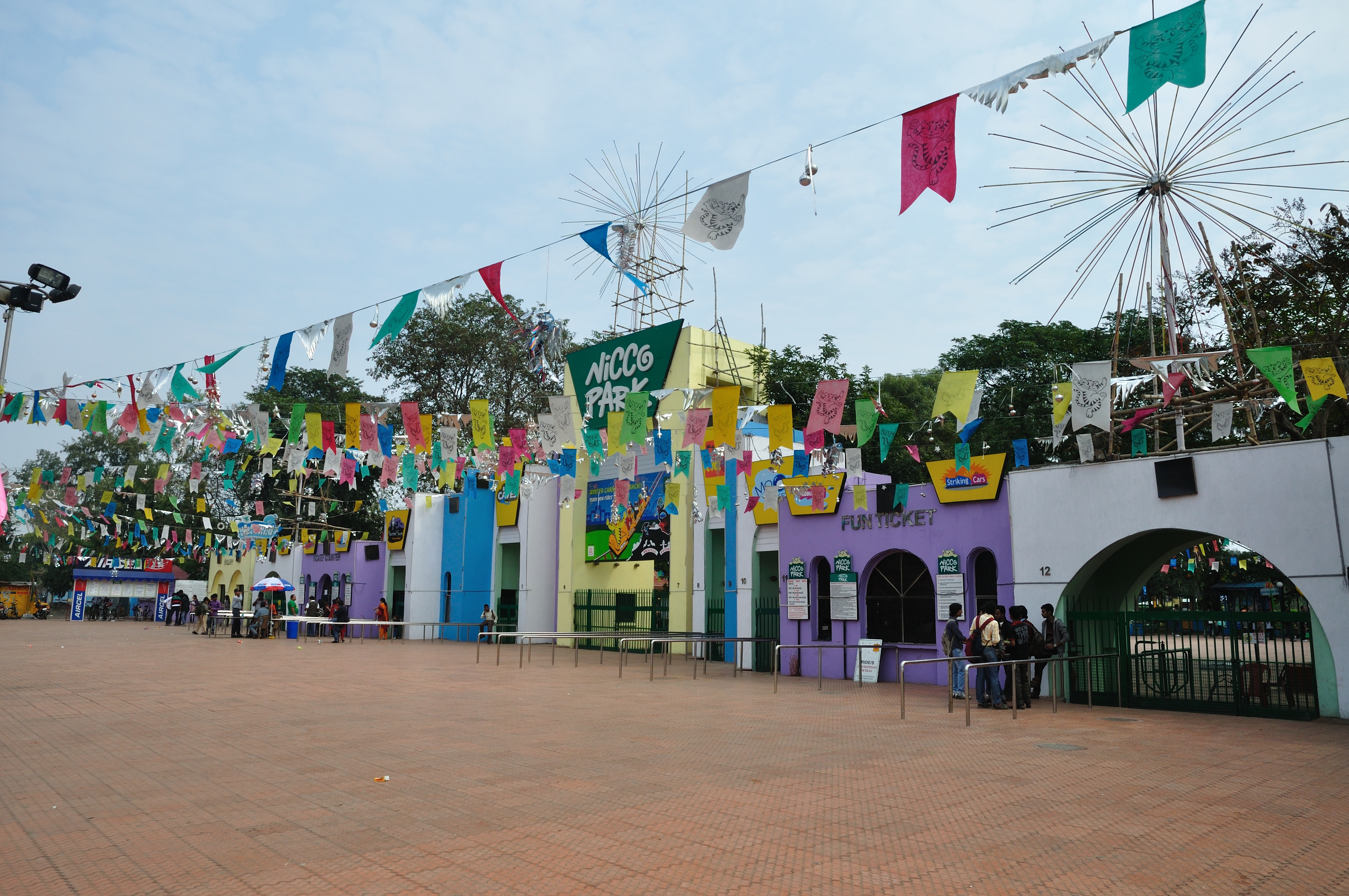
The main public entrance of Nicco Park, Jheel Meel, Kolkata

== Incidents ==
An accident occurred at Nicco Park in January 2010 when a woman and child fell off of the park's Moon Raker ride. Authorities claim the accident was caused by the woman's own carelessness, but she blames the accident on company negligence, citing the derailment of two of the six trolleys.

== See also ==
- Eco Park
- Millennium Park
- Nature Park
