= Dobrivoje Tošković =

Serbian architect (1927–2021)

- Born: Dobrivoje Tošković; 1927; Draginac, Kingdom of SHS
- Died: 25 January 2021 (aged 93–94)
- Education: Faculty of Architecture, University of Belgrade (B.Sc, M.Sc, PhD)
- Occupations: Architect, urban planner, university professor
- Known for: Master plan for Bidhannagar (Salt Lake City), urban planning in Serbia and Africa

Dobrivoje Tošković (Serbian Cyrillic: Добривоје Тошковић; 1927 – 25 January 2021) was a Serbian and Yugoslav architect, urban planner, and university professor. His work, particularly in the context of the Non-Aligned Movement, represented a distinct "third way" in urban planning, grounded in humanism and cultural sensitivity.

Considered an "ambassador without a decree," he left a profound mark through his projects in India, Tanzania, and Libya, as well as through the creation of urban plans for numerous cities in Serbia. His life's work is the master plan for the city of Bidhannagar (New Kolkata) in India. He was a full member of the Academy of Engineering Sciences of Serbia.

== Early life and education ==
Tošković was born in 1927 in the Serbian village of Draginac. He completed his undergraduate, master's, and doctoral studies at the Faculty of Architecture, University of Belgrade. He also undertook postgraduate studies in the Netherlands.

During his high school years in Valjevo, he was taught the Serbian language by the acclaimed poet Desanka Maksimović. This literary mentorship is considered to have significantly influenced his later humanistic approach and clarity of expression, equipping him with the communicative and interpretive tools necessary for his context-sensitive planning.

His professional career was built as a professor at the Faculty of Geography in Belgrade, in the department of spatial planning, and as a research fellow at the Institute of Architecture and Urban & Spatial Planning of Serbia.

== International career ==
=== Bidhannagar (Salt Lake City), India ===
The project that defined Tošković's career emerged while he was working for the Serbian company "Ivan Milutinović" on the drainage of a salt lake near Kolkata in 1965. He was invited to participate in an international competition for a new city to be built on the reclaimed land. His winning master plan for the new city, now known as Bidhannagar (or Salt Lake City), designed for 200,000 inhabitants, was based on the garden city concept.

His solution was considered revolutionary for its time, creating a more humane and higher-quality concept compared to the works of other world-renowned modernists like Le Corbusier in Chandigarh. He solved complex challenges by respecting local socio-cultural preferences for clustered housing instead of high-rise buildings and by creating a varied urban landscape on a completely flat terrain. For this achievement, Tošković received the highest honors in India. He later documented his work in the book and exhibition "Salt Lake City, Kolkata, India – from idea to realization".

=== Projects in Africa ===
His work in Tanzania and Libya is an example of the Yugoslav model of exporting urban planning expertise within the Non-Aligned Movement.

- In Tanzania, he led the development of the Ruvuma Regional Plan, eight general urban plans, and numerous village plans. His reputation was such that the President of Tanzania, Julius Nyerere, once sent a private plane to bring him for consultations.
- In Libya, he participated in the "modern urbanization" of the country, as part of a broader engagement of Yugoslav engineers and architects in the region.

== Work in Serbia and Republika Srpska ==
While his international career was extensive, Tošković's contribution to his home country was equally significant, not only through specific plans but also through the establishment of a planning methodology enriched by his global experience.

=== Urban planner in Serbian cities ===
Tošković was directly involved in creating numerous urban plans for key cities in Serbia, including Šabac, Valjevo, Ćuprija, and Užice. This practical work demonstrates his commitment to addressing the specific challenges of urbanization in what was then Yugoslavia. His work within the prestigious Institute of Architecture and Urban & Spatial Planning of Serbia (IAUS) served as the primary platform for this institutional contribution. His international practice informed and enriched local theory, giving his domestic contributions significant real-world depth. His methodological approach often began with what he termed the "clean sheet," a concept of starting urban planning from a fresh, analytical perspective.

=== Mentorship in Republika Srpska ===
Tošković played a crucial role in the post-war development of the academic community in Republika Srpska. He provided "selfless support for the founding and development" of the Faculty of Architecture and Civil Engineering at the University of Banja Luka, where he taught until 2004. As a professor and mentor to numerous students, masters, and doctoral candidates, he directly shaped a new generation of professionals in the region.

== Legacy ==
Dobrivoje Tošković's lasting influence is seen through his extensive academic work and institution-building. He had a long and impactful teaching career as a professor at the Faculty of Geography, University of Belgrade, in the department of spatial planning. He also expanded his global reach as a lecturer at universities in Mosul, Iraq, and Helsinki, Finland.

His legacy is one of a more humane, context-sensitive modernism—a "third way" of urbanism forged in the unique geopolitical context of non-aligned Yugoslavia. His personal qualities, described as having high "professional integrity" and "human warmth," were the foundation of a professional methodology that viewed cities not as abstract designs but as homes for people.

== See also ==
- Bidhannagar
- Land reclamation
