= Sri Aurobindo Institute of Education, Kolkata =

Sri Aurobindo Institute of Education
- Salt Lake, Kolkata, West Bengal; India

Information
- School type: English Medium Private School
- Principal: Mr. Anthony Das
- Grades: Lower Nursery to Class XII examination
- Campus type: Urban
- Colours: Aspiration(Red), Invocation (blue), Enterprise(Green), Symphony (yellow).
- Website: www.sriaurosaltlake.in//

Sri Aurobindo Institute of Education is a K-12 school based in Salt Lake City, Kolkata, India. It follows the syllabus of the Council for the Indian School Certificate Examinations. It is guided by the principles of Sri Aurobindo. It opened in 1983 with one campus in BK Block, and subsequently opened another campus in CL Block. The school is recognized by the Education Department of the Government of West Bengal and is affiliated to the Council for the Indian School Certificate Examinations, New Delhi.
