= Bhavan's Gangabux Kanoria Vidyamandir =

Bhavan's Gangabux Kanoria Vidyamandir, Kolkata
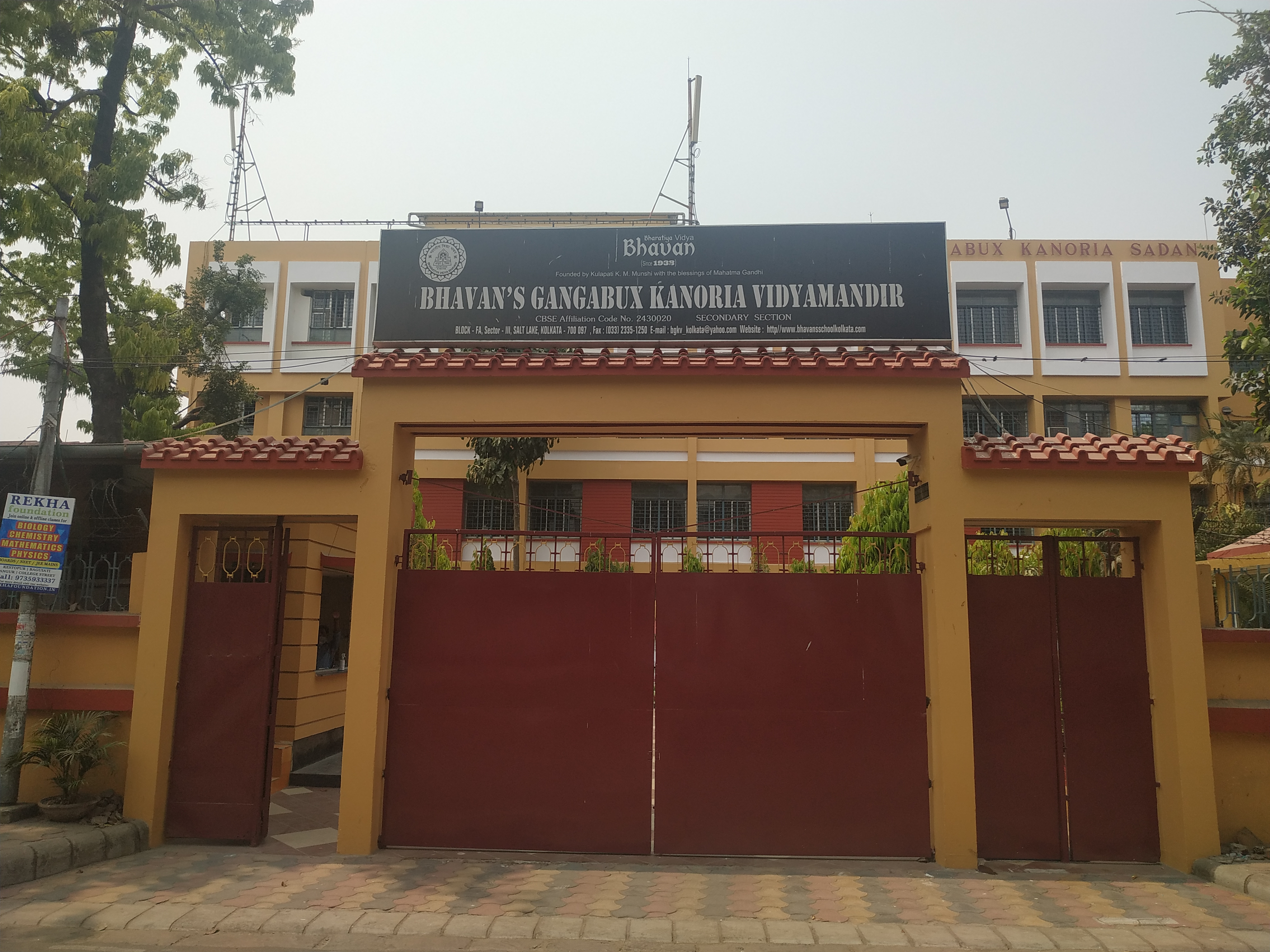

Location
- Block - FA, Sector - III, Salt Lake City, Kolkata - 700097; Bidhannagar, West Bengal, India; 22°34′38.44″N 88°24′10.24″E

Information
- School type: Private, Co-educational School
- Motto: "॥ अमृत तु विद्या॥" ("Knowledge is Nectar")
- Established: 1984
- Status: On-going Academic Year 2025-26
- School board: CBSE
- Authority: Bharatiya Vidya Bhavan
- Director: Dr. G. V. Subramanian
- Principal: Mrs. Monami Chattopadhyay (Secondary)
- Headmistress: Smt. Suparna Chatterjee (Primary)
- Classes: Primary Wing: 5 + 3 (Preparatory 1, 2 & 3; Classes I to V) Secondary Wing: Classes 6 to 12 [CBSE K-12 Schooling]
- Song: Sanskrit: "जय जय विध्या, भवन भरती" English: "Victory to Bharatiya Vidya Bhavan!"
- Affiliation: CBSE
- Website: bhavansgkvidyamandir.edu.in

Bhavan's Gangabux Kanoria Vidyamandir (BGKV, Kolkata) is a private school in Bidhannagar, West Bengal, India, established in 1984. It is a co-ed K-12 school, affiliated with the Central Board of Secondary Education, New Delhi and administered by the Bharatiya Vidya Bhavan. It was named after Seth Gangabux Kanoria, a Marwari businessman. The school was inaugurated on 18 June 1984 with classes I to V. The first batch of students appeared for the CBSE examinations in 1988. It is among the premier CBSE schools of the city.
