= Salt Lake School =

Location
- CA 221, Sector I Salt Lake City, Kolkata, West Bengal, 700064; India; 22.5869°N 88.3994°E

Information
- Motto: Reverence, Duty, Knowledge
- Established: 1979
- Principal: Payel Das
- Website: www.saltlakeschool.org

Salt Lake School is a co-educational school situated in Salt Lake City, Kolkata, India. This institution not only focuses on the academics, but also sports and several other co-curricular aspects of the students. Few alumnus of Salt Lake School have secured an all-India rank in competitive examinations.

== History ==
The Government of West Bengal in consideration of the need of multilingual population of Salt Lake (Bidhan Nagar), a growing satellite city of Kolkata Metropolis, sponsored Salt Lake School (English Medium) vide Memorandum No. 872 Edn(s) dated 1 July 1978 of the Education Management, under its own management and under the supervision of the Deputy Director of School Education (Anglo-Indian School), Government of West Bengal. The school started from the academic year of 1979 (8 January 1979).

On 1 September 1981, the management of the school was handed over to Salt Lake School (English Medium) Society constituted by the guardians, teachers and other employees of the school, registered under the West Bengal Societies Registration Act XXVI of 1961 vide G.O. No 759 Edn(s) dated 19.8.81 of the Education Department, Government of West Bengal. Students are trained and prepared for Indian Certificate of Secondary Education examinations, New Delhi. Classes are held from Pre-Primary level 1 to Class XII.

The School was affiliated to the CISCE, New Delhi, vide code number WB-049 dated 27.2.86 of the Council on the basis of "No Objection Certificate" issued by the Government of West Bengal dated 26.7.85. The first batch of students appeared for the ICSE exam from this school in March 1987.

The Council for Indian School Certificate Examinations, New Delhi, in their letter dated 1.6.89 accorded permission for opening class XI of ISC (+2 stream) from the academic session commencing from June 1989. The first batch of ISC (+2 stream) appeared for their final examination in 1991.

== Curriculum ==
The school follows the curriculum recommended by the Council for the Indian School Certificate Examination. The medium of instruction is English. However, Bengali and Hindi are compulsory subjects as vernaculars in the 3-language scheme under secondary education.

== Amenities and events ==
=== Infrastructure ===
This school has a total of 5 floors, including the ground floor and consists of 2 buildings conjoined to each other, one having all of the G+4 floors and having a straight corridor, while the other one having G+2 floors and having a square corridor, popularly known as the "Quadrangle" surrounding the children's park for pre-primary classes in the morning section. This school also has a garden near gate 1 and 2, a sand field, a basketball court, and 42 air-conditioned rooms out of the total 45 rooms. The school has 3 halls, 2 of which are permanent (Hall 1 of the ground floor and New Hall), and 1 which can be converted (rooms 24-27 in the first floor). All of these halls are air-conditioned, meant for cultural events, regular classes and board examinations.

== See also ==
- Education in India
- List of schools in India
- Education in West Bengal
