= Indian Association of Amusement Parks and Industries =

- Abbreviation: IAAPI
- Formation: 1999; 27 years ago
- Type: Trade association
- Purpose: To promote safe operations, global development, and commercial success of the amusement parks, attractions industry and indoor amusement centers
- Headquarters: Mumbai, Maharashtra, India
- Region served: India
- Chairman: Ankur Maheshwary
- First Vice Chairman: Prashant Kanoria
- Second Vice Chairman: Maneesh Verma
- Employees: 7 (2025)
- Website: iaapi.org

The Indian Association of Amusement Parks and Industries (IAAPI) is an apex body representing the interests of amusement parks, theme parks, water parks and indoor amusement centers in India. IAAPI is a non-government, not-for-profit, industry-led and industry-managed organization, playing a proactive role in the development of this sector. Founded in 1999, IAAPI is India's premier business association having over 600 members from private sectors including small and medium enterprises consisting of park operators and equipment manufacturers. IAAPI is recognized and affiliated with various international trade bodies operating in the amusement sector.

IAAPI represents location-based entertainment facilities, including amusement and theme parks, snow parks, indoor amusement centers, arcades, museums, water parks, aquariums, science centers, zoos, bowling alleys and resorts. It also represents industry equipment manufacturers, distributors, operators, industry suppliers, and service providers. IAAPI's head office is in Mumbai and it has four regional chapters and sector-relevant committees led by industry leaders. IAAPI serves as a reference point for the Indian amusement sector.

== Mission and objectives ==
The mission of IAAPI is to create a conducive environment for the sustainable growth of the amusement industry in India. The association aims to achieve this through:

Advocacy: Representing the interests of its members and the industry at large by engaging with regulatory bodies and government agencies.

Education: Promoting knowledge-sharing and continuous learning through workshops, seminars, and conferences to enhance industry expertise.

Safety Standards: Advocating and upholding the highest safety standards to ensure the well-being of visitors to amusement facilities.

Networking: Providing a platform for industry professionals to network, collaborate, and share insights for mutual benefit.

== Membership ==
IAAPI boasts a diverse membership base of around 700 strong members comprising amusement facility owners, suppliers, manufacturers, and other stakeholders. The association's strength lies in its collective approach to addressing industry challenges and driving positive change.

== Mascot ==
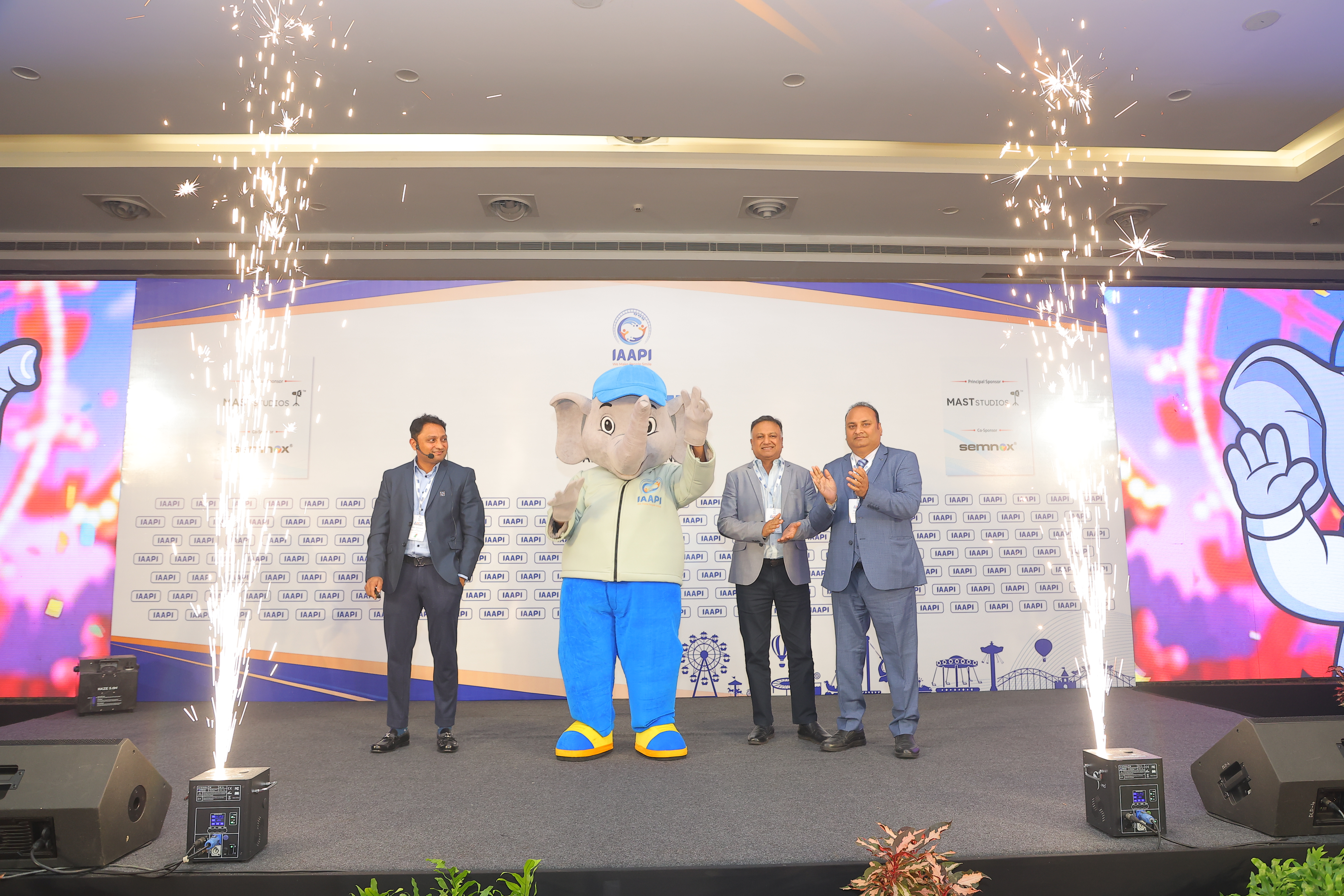
Gaja - the official mascot of IAAPI

On August 21, 2025, during the AMTP in Hyderabad, IAAPI unveiled its official mascot, Gaja. Gaja stands as a symbol of creativity, inclusivity, and ambition, signaling the Indian amusement industry's evolution from standard rides to comprehensive stories, icons, and experiences.

== Rebranding ==
On 19 January 2024, as it celebrated its 25th anniversary, IAAPI underwent a rebranding and unveiled a fresh new logo and color scheme. The focus was on reflecting the industry's evolution and embracing upcoming technologies, all while maintaining the existing ethos.

== Events ==
Annual IAAPI Expo: One of the flagship events organized by IAAPI is the annual IAAPI Expo. This expo serves as a global stage for industry players, featuring the latest technological advancements, trends, and innovations in the amusement sector. With exhibitors from around the world, the expo facilitates networking opportunities and fosters international collaboration.

The IAAPI Expo 2026, held from March 10–12, 2026, at the Bombay Exhibition Centre in Mumbai, marked a historic milestone as the association's largest expo to date. Spanning an expansive 14,000 square meters, the event showcased the pinnacle of innovation and industry trends, drawing unprecedented global investment interest and historic industry pacts. The increased exhibition space reflected the dynamic growth and significance of the amusement sector in India. IAAPI Expo 2027 would be held 3–5 March 2027.

Previously, the IAAPI Amusement Expo 2025 was held from March 19–21, 2025, at the Bombay Exhibition Centre. The expo attracted a large volume of visitors from more than 30 countries, with exhibitors from 25 countries participating in the event.

IAC Connect: A significant sub-event within the IAAPI Expo is "IAC Connect," focusing on Indoor Amusement Centers (IAC). This platform brings together operators, manufacturers, and consultants from the indoor amusement sector, fostering innovation and growth. Notably, during the 2026 event, IAAPI collaborated with ANAROCK Consulting to launch the first-ever white paper on India's Indoor Amusement Centre industry, providing comprehensive data and strategic insights into the sector's growth.

Safety and Standardization: As part of its commitment to elevating industry standards, IAAPI actively promotes operational safety. The association has published a comprehensive, professional Safety Handbook designed to guide amusement park and indoor amusement center operators in implementing robust, internationally aligned safety protocols.

AMTP (Annual Meeting and Training Program): IAAPI hosts the Annual Meeting and Training Program (AMTP), a key initiative that underscores the association's commitment to education and professional development. This program provides industry professionals with a unique opportunity to gather, share insights, and participate in training sessions. Through AMTP, IAAPI contributes to the continuous enhancement of skills and knowledge within the amusement industry.

Other Events: In addition to the aforementioned initiatives, IAAPI conducts diverse training programs, workshops, and conclaves across different regions of India throughout the year. These events serve as comprehensive guidance, training, and facilitation platforms for its members. Furthermore, IAAPI organizes international training events held outside India, offering members a global perspective and fostering strong bonds among them.

During the COVID-19 pandemic, the themed entertainment industry faced significant pressures. IAAPI was among several themed entertainment organizations whose members faced potential billions in losses as a result. The IAAPI 2021 Expo was postponed by a year due to the pandemic.

== Awards ==
The National Awards for Excellence is an initiative organized by IAAPI that recognizes those who work in the Indian amusement industry.

== Thriller Magazine publication ==
IAAPI publishes its magazine, Thriller, the official magazine for members. It also comes with monthly newsletter to keep its membership informed about current and pending federal, state and local amusement-related laws and legislation.

== Services ==
IAAPI offers training in every aspect of the amusement-park and attractions industry and provides member facilities with opportunities to educate their personnel with workshops, on-site seminars, videotapes, manuals and webinars. The association promotes amusement park safety standards to its members and regularly does safety conclaves. It also does a yearly offshore training program knows as AMTP.
