= International School of Business and Media =

International School of Business & Media
- Type: Private Business School
- Established: 2000
- President: Dr. Pramod Kumar
- Location: Pune, Kolkata, Bangalore, India
- Campus: Urban
- Website: www.isbm.ac.in

Location of the 4 ISB&M campuses. ISB&M name (city/town, if different from name)

International School of Business & Media (ISB&M) is a group of private business schools in India, founded in 2000.

== Post Graduate Diploma in Management (PGDM) ==
=== ISB&M Pune, Nande Campus ===
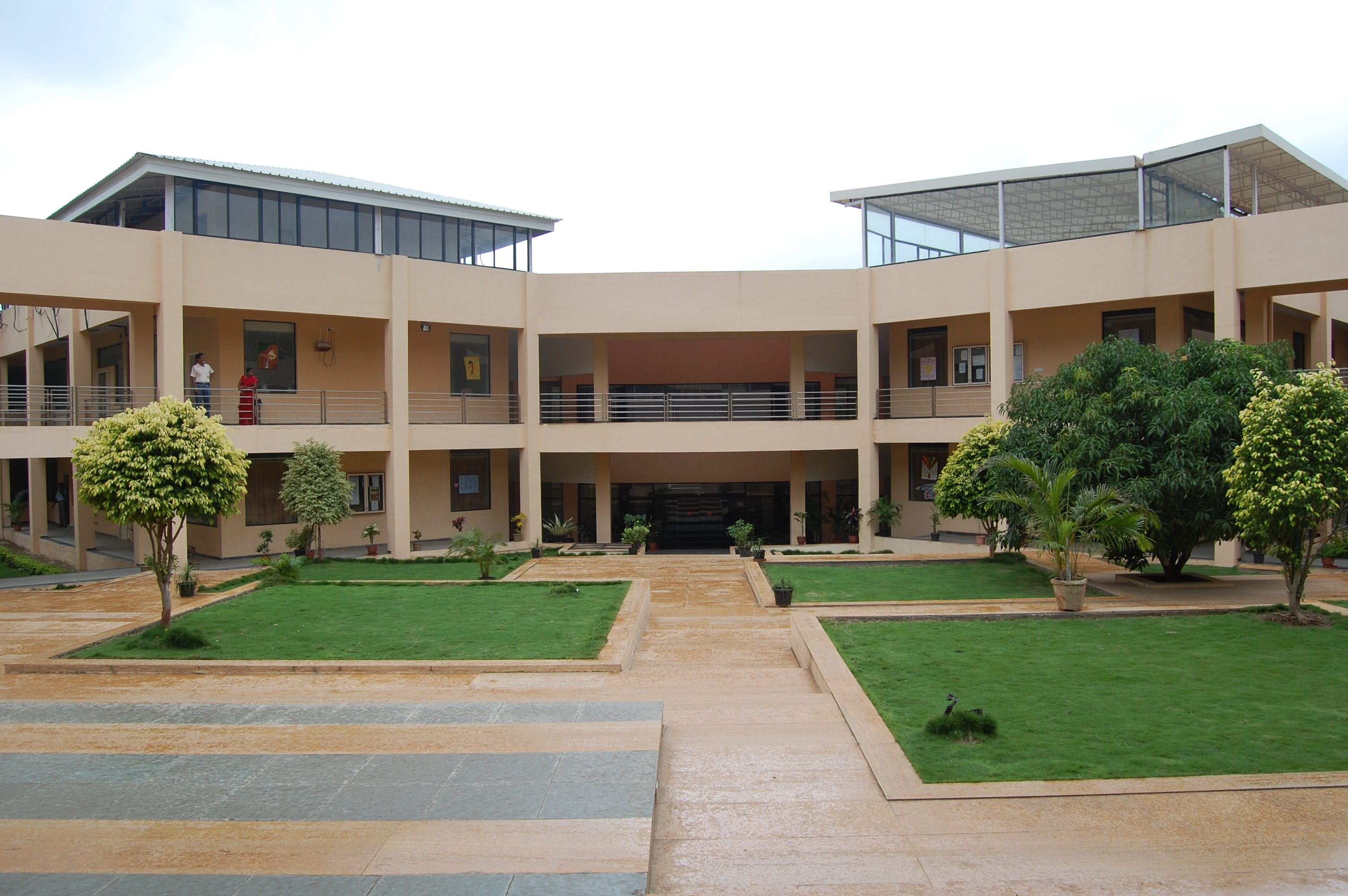
ISB&M Nande

ISB&M Nande offers a 2-year Post Graduate Diploma in Management (PGDM) programme with dual specialization.

- Marketing
- Finance
- Human Resource Management
- Logistics & Supply Chain Management
- Media & Communication
- Business Analytics

An inter-campus exchange programme is also available to combine different programmes of specialization by spending one trimester at another campus

=== ISB&M Kolkata Campus ===
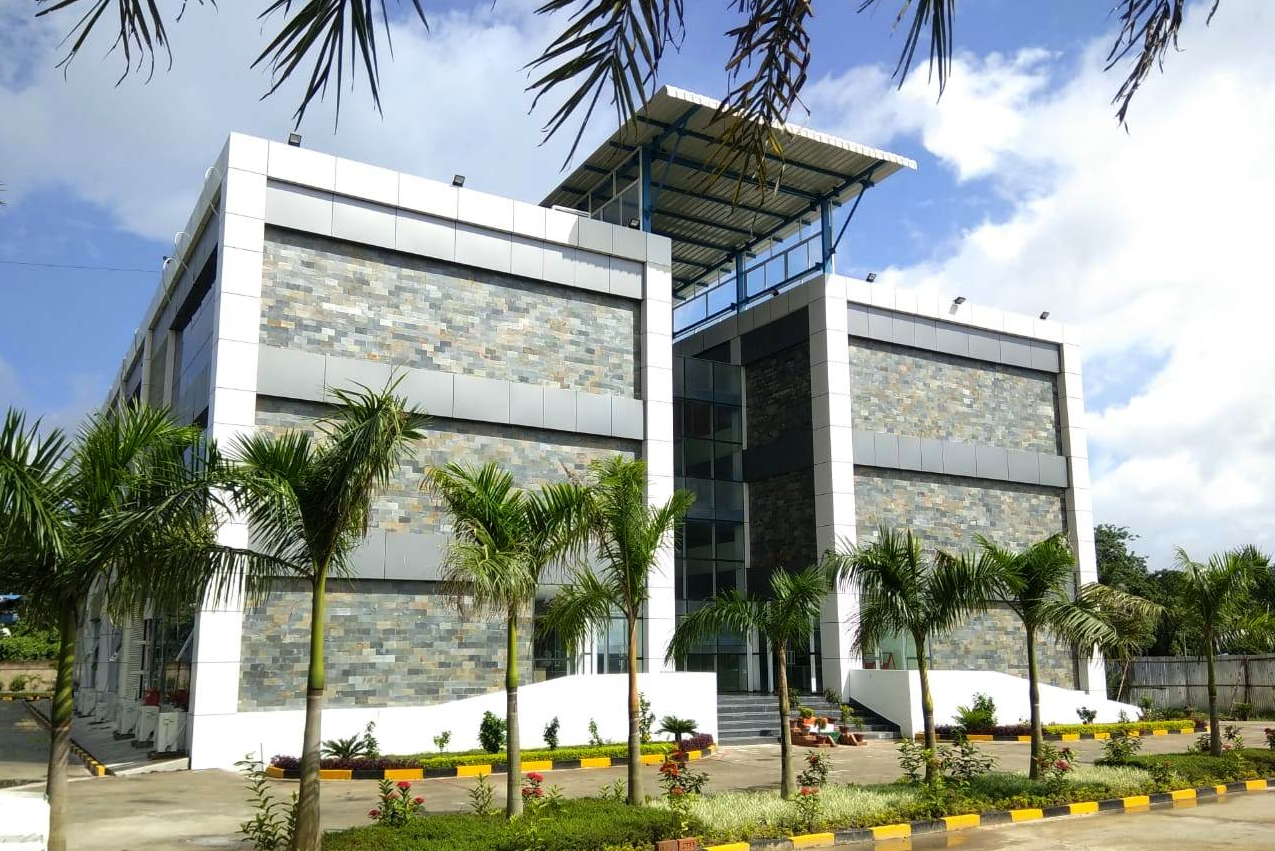
ISB&M Kolkata

ISB&M Kolkata offers a 2-year full-time Post Graduate Diploma in Management (PGDM) programme with dual specialization.

- Marketing
- Finance
- Human Resource Management
- Supply Chain & Operations Management
- Media & Communication

== Undergraduate Programme ==
=== ISB&M College of Commerce ===
ISB&M COC affiliated to Savitribai Phule Pune University offering 3 years full-time Under-graduate courses in the following disciplines

- BBA
- BBA (Computer Application)
- BBA + Media/ Healthcare Management
- BBA( Computer Application) + Media/Healthcare Management

The programme is made up of general business, specialist business, and liberal arts subjects.

== ISB&M School of Technology Pune ==
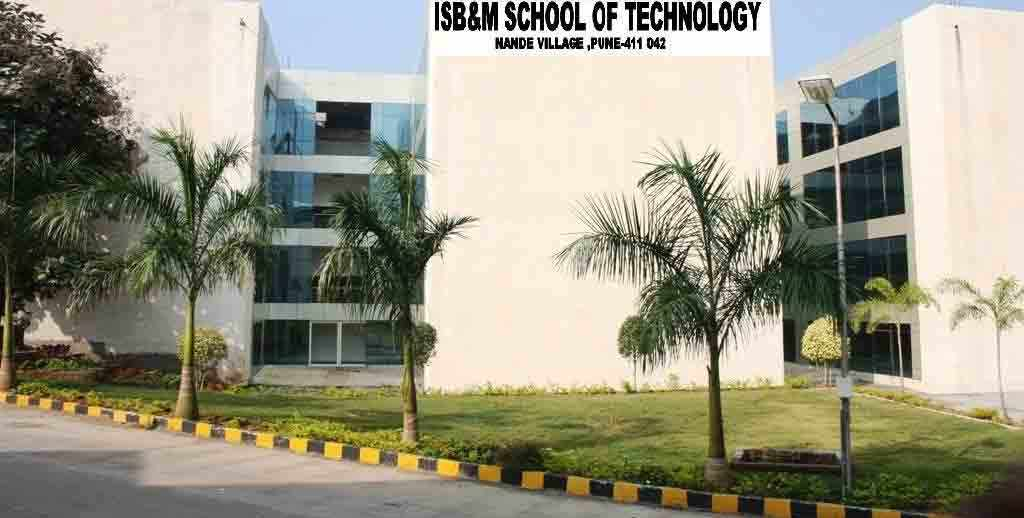
ISB&M School of Technology

ISB&M School of Technology is a part of the Pune-Nande campus. It is approved by AICTE, New Delhi, recognized by DTE and affiliated to the University of Pune. It offers a four-year full-time Bachelor of Engineering degree in the following disciplines:

- Mechanical Engineering
- Electronics & Telecommunication Engineering
- Computer Engineering
- Digital Automation & Robotics

(Optional Certificate Program)

== Student life ==
=== Student cells ===
ISB&M has numerous cells which are essentially student-driven and managed by the students but usually have a faculty member as a guide and mentor. Each cell focuses on a different need or aspect of student life. The student cells are as follows:

- Campus Recruitment
- Corporate Relation Cell
- Alumni Cell
- Digital Moments Cell
- Sports Academy
- Cultural Cell
- Digital Marketing Cell
- Debate Cell
- CSR Cell
- Medios
- Marketing club
- Scope Club
- Intellectual -Talk
- TOFI
- Grey cell

=== Events ===
The Student Council organizes several events, giving them experience in planning, budgeting and managing events. Events are an integral part of a student's life not only for enjoyment but also to help develop their managerial skills.

HR Share: An annual two-day HR conference where industry leaders are invited to discuss emerging trends in Human Resource.

Chain Act: A supply chain conference hosted by ISB&M where speakers from industry share their experiences on contemporary issues in Supply Chain Management.

Crescendo: An annual three-day cultural programme organized by the students of the Pune-Nande campus, including quizzes, dance, music, painting, innovative games and a fashion show. On the last day, a prominent artist performs live.
