= Government College of Engineering and Leather Technology =

Engineering College in West Bengal

Coordinates: 22.5602°N 88.4109°E

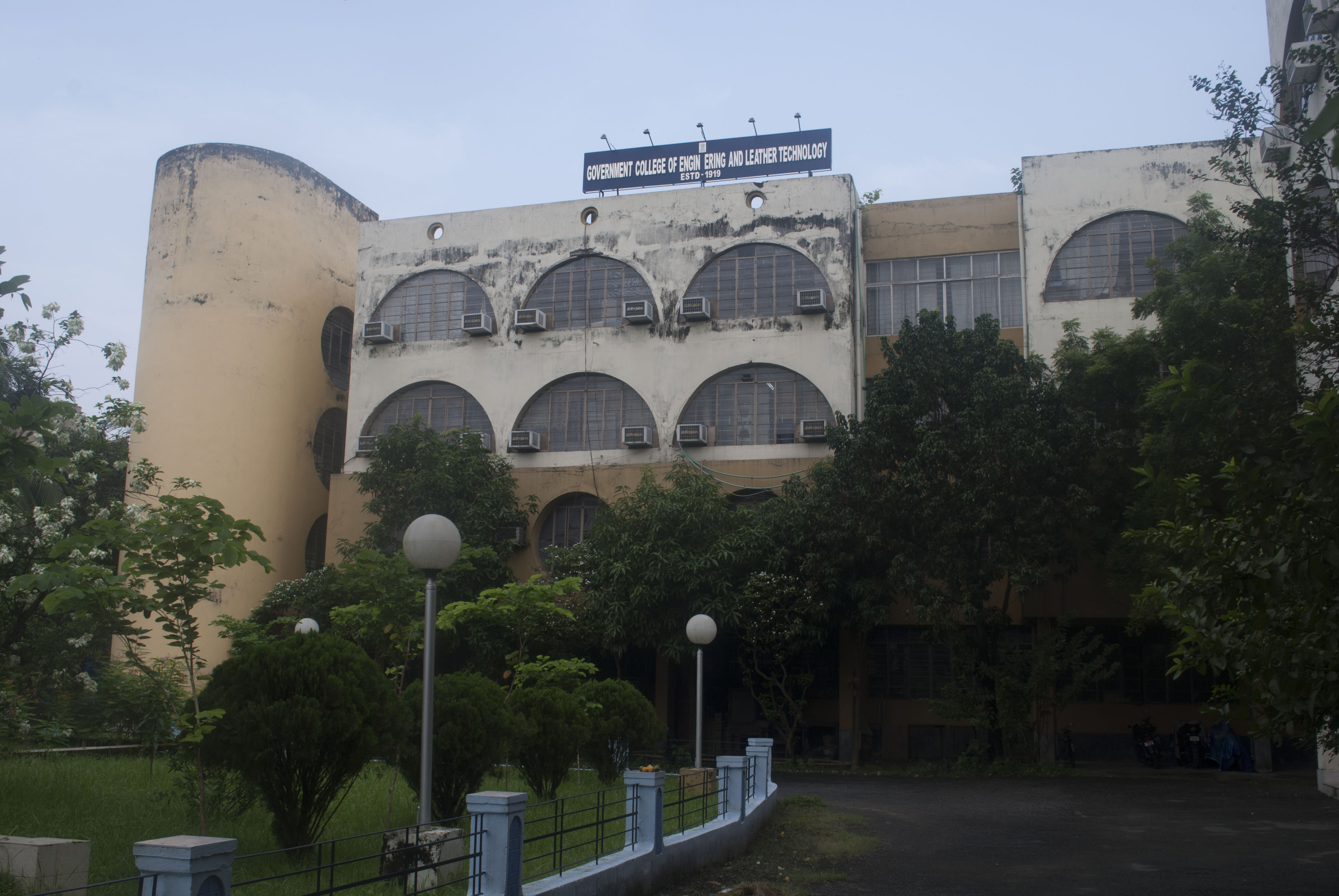
- Former names: Calcutta Research Tannery; Bengal Tanning Institute; College of Leather Technology
- Type: Public Engineering College
- Established: 1919; 107 years ago
- Founders: Dr. Biraj Mohan Das
- Academic affiliations: MAKAUT
- Principal: Sanjoy Chakroborty (Officer-in-charge)
- Academic staff: 50
- Undergraduates: 650
- Postgraduates: 50
- Location: Block – LB 11, Sector-III, Salt Lake, West Bengal, Kolkata-700106
- Campus: Urban
- Approvals: AICTE
- Website: gcelt.gov.in

The Government College of Engineering and Leather Technology, often referred to as GCELT, is an institute offering engineering courses at undergraduate levels in Computer Science & Engineering, Information Technology and Leather Technology, The college is affiliated to the Maulana Abul Kalam Azad University of Technology (formerly known as West Bengal University of Technology) and is approved by AICTE. This institute is situated in Kolkata in the Indian State of West Bengal.

== History ==
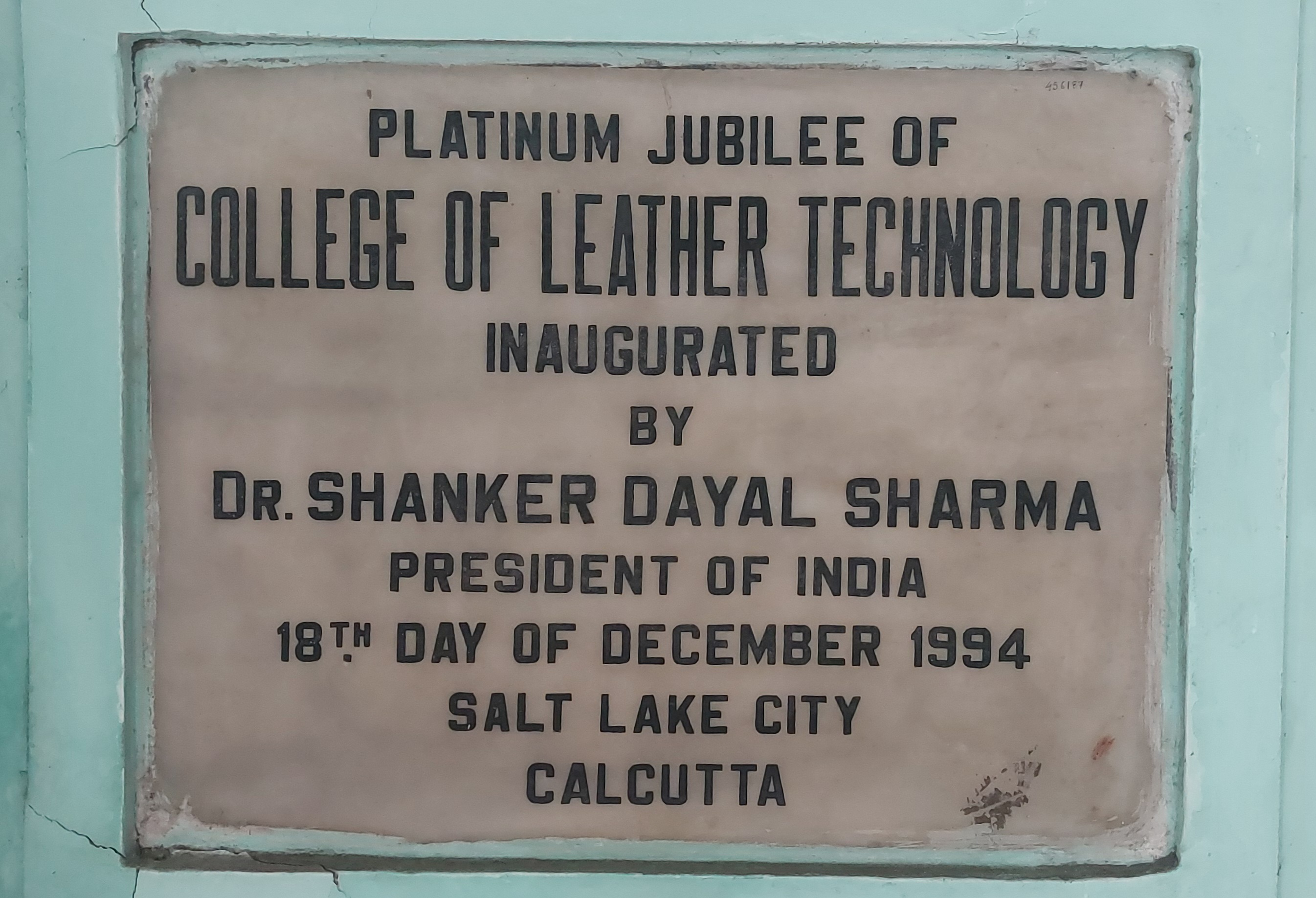
Platinum Jubilee plaque in the college

The Government College of Engineering and Leather Technology was established in 1919 on being recommended by the Munitions Board after the First World War to use indigenous resources of hides, skins and tanning materials for producing leather goods and the development of the leather industry in India.

It was known as Calcutta Research Tannery founded by Dr. Biraj Mohan Das, and was renamed to Bengal Tanning Institute in 1926. The institute became affiliated with Calcutta University and introduced a certificate course in tanning. In 1955, the B.Sc. (Tech) course in Leather Technology was introduced. The name of the institute was changed in 1958 to College of Leather Technology.

Calcutta Research Tannery as well as Bengal Tanning Institute was situated at the campus of Canal South Road, Beleghata (presently that place is the campus of RCCIIT college). In 1994, the campus was moved from there to the present address of Salt Lake City.

In 1999–2000, apart from the B.Tech in Leather Technology that it was offering, the college started offering B.Tech. in Information Technology and in 2000–2001 B.Tech. in Computer Science & Technology.

== Present status ==
GCELT is officially under the jurisdiction of the Department of Higher Education and Directorate of Technical education of the Government of West Bengal.

== Courses offered ==
The institute offers B.Tech in Computer Science and Engineering, Information Technology, Leather Technology and M.Tech in Leather Technology. The institute also offers a certificate course on 'Boot and Shoe Manufacturing'.

== College programs ==
- Fresher's Welcome -- The event is organized to welcome the 1st year students of the college. Usually 2nd year students organized it. On that special day, there is a cultural program with lunch arrangement for newcomers. This ends with the DJ evening and the whole event is restricted only to college students.
- Technical Fest – Enginerds was first organized in the year 2010.
- Cultural Fest – Punormilon is one of the most important cultural events of GCELT with the get-together of all the Ex-Students and Present-Students under the same roof.

Every year a new committee is formed to organize the PUNORMILON. The committee contains members from all the streams and from present students as well as from Alumni. All the responsibilities of organizing the event is on the committee members. The events of Punormilon include Inauguration, College Performance, Tribute to Alumni, Rabindra Sangeet, Band Performance and also DJ.
