= Education in India =

Ministry of Education
- Minister of Education: Pralhad Joshi

National education budget
- Budget: 2.9% of GDP ($112 billion)

General details
- Primary languages: Assamese; Bengali; Boro; Dogri; English; Gujarati; Hindi; Kannada; Kashmiri; Konkani; Maithili; Malayalam; Meitei (Manipuri); Marathi; Nepali; Odia; Punjabi; Sanskrit; Santali; Sindhi; Tamil; Telugu; Urdu; and other Indian languages
- System type: Federal, state and private
- Established Compulsory education: 1 April 2010

Literacy (2011)
- Total: 77.7%
- Male: 84.6%
- Female: 70.3%

Enrollment (2011)
- Total: (N/A)
- Primary: 95%
- Secondary: 69%
- Post secondary: 25%

Education in India is primarily managed through the state-run public education system, which falls under the command of the government at three levels: central, state, and local. Under various articles of the Indian Constitution and the Right of Children to Free and Compulsory Education Act, 2009, free and compulsory education is provided as a fundamental right to children aged 6 to 14. Educational access and quality vary significantly based on factors such as location (urban or rural), gender, caste, language, and socioeconomic status.

Schooling is divided into four main levels: primary education, secondary education, higher education, and vocational education, and can be completed in publicly funded or private schools. The approximate ratio of the total number of public schools to private schools in India is 10:3.

Issues including grade inflation, corruption, fraudulent institutions, and poor employment prospects frequently affect students in India. Half of all graduates in India are considered unemployable. It has also been argued that this system has been associated with an emphasis on rote learning and external perspectives.

English is used as a major medium of instruction in higher education, however is often poorly taught due to the lack of proficient English-speaking teachers, placing underprivileged students at a disadvantage in higher education and professional domains.

== History ==
=== Early education ===
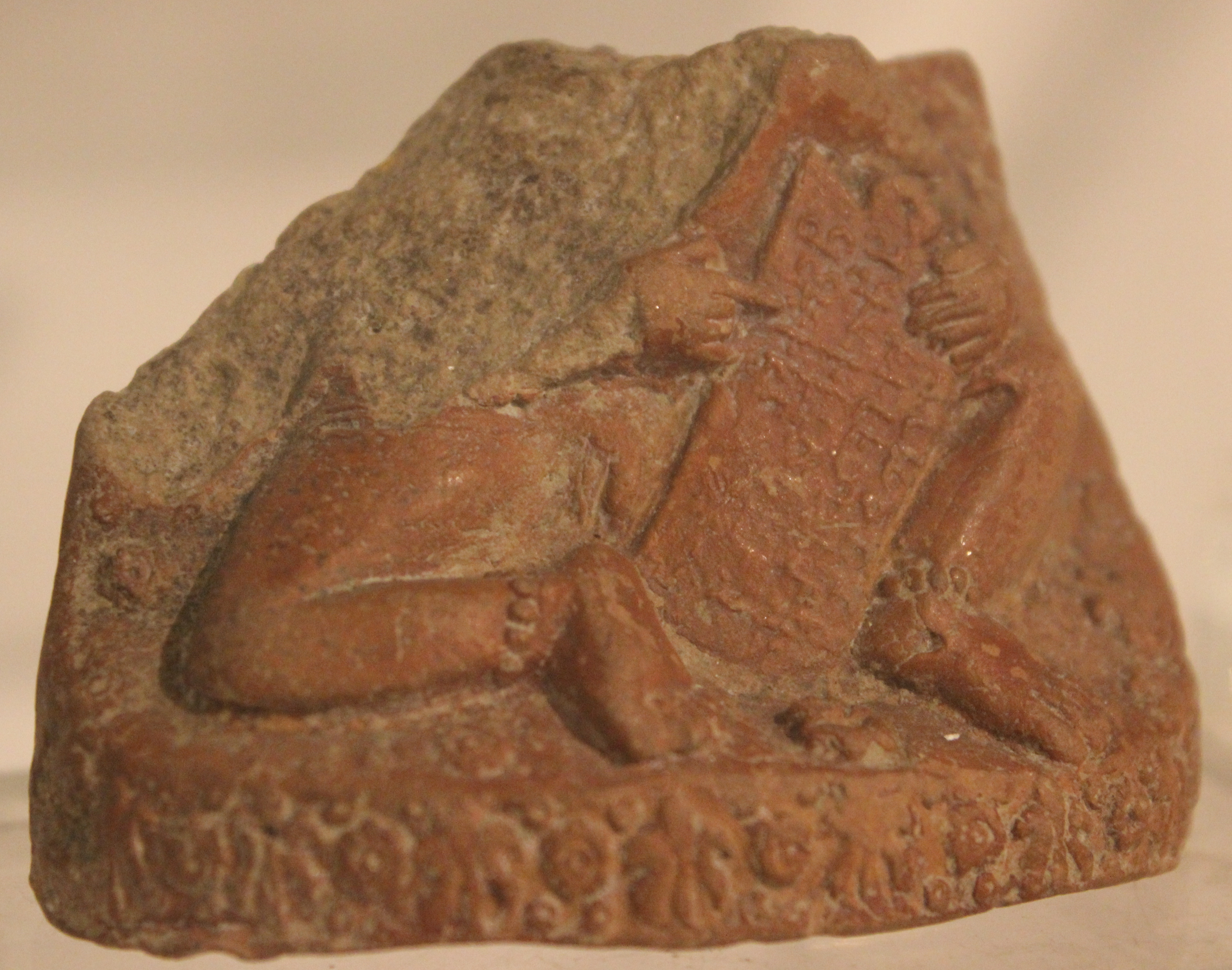
A child learning alphabets, showing the first letters of the Brahmi alphabet, 2nd century BCE.

Early education in India was delivered through gurukuls, and placed importance on the guru (teacher), particularly on the relationship between the guru and their shishya (students). The first higher learning institute was located in Taxila, possibly dating as far back as the 8th century BCE.

The institute is often referred to as a university, however, the usage of the modern-day term is debatable as the teachers living there may not have had official membership of particular colleges, and there did not seem to have existed purpose-built lecture halls and residential quarters. Nalanda, located in medieval Magadha (modern-day Bihar), is regarded as the world's first residential university, and all subjects there were taught in the Pali language.

Buddhist monasteries offered secular education in medical studies. From 500 BCE to 400 BCE, Buddhist learning centres became common, and attracted foreign students to study topics such as Buddhist Páli literature, logic, and páli grammar. Notable institutions included Nalanda, Vikramashila, and Odantapuri. Chanakya, a Brahmin teacher, was among the most famous teachers, associated with the founding of the Mauryan Empire.

Shramanas and Brahmanas historically offered education by means of donations, rather than charging fees or the procurement of funds from students or their guardians. Later, stupas and temples also became centres of education; religious education was compulsory, but secular subjects were also taught. Students were required to be brahmacharis or celibate. The knowledge in these orders was often related to the tasks a section of the society had to perform. Arts, crafts, Ayurveda, architecture, etc., were taught.

With the advent of Islam in India the traditional methods of education increasingly came under Islamic influence. Pre-Mughal rulers such as Qutb-ud-din Aybak and other Muslim rulers initiated institutions which imparted religious knowledge. Scholars such as Nizamuddin Auliya and Moinuddin Chishti became prominent educators and established Islamic monasteries. Students from Bukhara and Afghanistan visited India to study humanities and science. Islamic institution of education in India included traditional madrassas and maktabs which taught grammar, philosophy, mathematics, and law influenced by the Greek traditions inherited by Persia and the Middle East before Islam spread from these regions into India. A feature of traditional Islamic education was its emphasis on the connection between science and humanities.

British rule and the subsequent establishment of educational institutions saw the introduction of English as a medium of instruction. Some schools taught the curriculum through vernacular languages with English as a second language. The term "pre-modern" was used for three kinds of schools – the Arabic and Sanskrit schools which taught Muslim or Hindu sacred literature and the Persian schools which taught Persian literature. The vernacular schools across India taught reading and writing the vernacular language and arithmetic. British education became solidified into India as missionary schools were established during the 1820s.

=== 18th century ===
Dharampal was instrumental in changing the understanding of pre-colonial education in India. Dharampal's primary works are based on documentation by the colonial government on Indian education, agriculture, technology, and arts during the period of colonial rule in India. His pioneering historical research, conducted intensively over a decade, provides evidence from extensive early British administrators’ reports of the widespread prevalence of indigenous educational institutions in Bombay, Bengal and Madras Presidencies as well as in the Punjab, teaching a sophisticated curriculum, with daily school attendance by about 30% of children aged 6–15.

In 1818, the fall of Maratha Empire lead to large parts of India coming under British rule. During the decade of 1820–30, detailed surveys of the indigenous education system that were prevalent in their provinces were conducted by the British.

G.L. Prendergast, a member of the Governor's Council in Bombay Presidency, recorded the following about indigenous schools on 27 June 1821:

"I need hardly mention what every member of the Board knows as well as I do, that there is hardly a village, great or small, throughout our territories, in which there is not at least one school, and in larger villages more; many in every town, and in large cities in every division; where young natives are taught reading, writing and arithmetic, upon a system so economical, from a handful or two of grain, to perhaps a rupee per month to the school master, according to the ability of the parents, and at the same time so simple and effectual, that there is hardly a cultivator or petty dealer who is not competent to keep his own accounts with a degree of accuracy, in my opinion, beyond what we meet with amongst the lower orders in our own country."

=== Colonial period and English education ===
In 1835, the English Education Act was passed by the colonial government, making English the formal medium of education in all schools and colleges. It neglected both indigenous schools and mass education, as only a small section of upper-class Indians were educated to become the connecting link between the government and the masses. This act is today popularly known as Macaulayism.

"We must at present do our best to form a class who may be interpreters between us and the millions whom we govern; a class of persons, Indian in blood and colour, but English in taste, in opinions, in morals, and in intellect. To that class we may leave it to refine the vernacular dialects of the country, to enrich those dialects with terms of science borrowed from the Western nomenclature, and to render them by degrees fit vehicles for conveying knowledge to the great mass of the population."

According to sociologist Hetukar Jha, this act lead to the decline of indigenous schools which flourished in villages and towns, and simultaneously, the Act skewed in favor of the filtration theory of education, which worked to block to a significant extent the entry of the middle classes and below.

=== Missionary schools ===
Christian missionary organisations played a notable role in the development of modern education in India from the late eighteenth to the early twentieth century. Working alongside colonial institutions and indigenous reform movements, missions contributed to the expansion of literacy, vernacular scholarship, teacher training, English-medium education and the establishment of schools and colleges. Their efforts form an important strand in the broader history of education in India.

=== Post-independence ===
Since the country's independence in 1947, the Indian government sponsored a variety of programmes to address the low literacy rate in both rural and urban India. Maulana Abul Kalam Azad, India's first Minister of Education, envisaged strong central government control over education throughout the country, with a uniform educational system.

The Union government established the University Education Commission (1948–1949), the Secondary Education Commission (1952–1953), University Grants Commission and the Kothari Commission (1964–66) to develop proposals to modernise India's education system. The Resolution on Scientific Policy was adopted by the government of Jawaharlal Nehru, India's first Prime Minister. The Nehru government sponsored the development of high-quality scientific education institutions such as the Indian Institutes of Technology. In 1961, the Union government formed the National Council of Educational Research and Training (NCERT) as an autonomous organisation that would advise both the Union and state governments on formulating and implementing education policies. In 2015, the Swach Vidyalaya had finished which was an initiative to put a functional toilet in every school.

==== 2020 ====
In 2019, the Indian Ministry of Education released a draft of a new education policy, which was followed by a number of public consultations. It discusses reducing curriculum content to enhance essential learning, critical thinking, and promoting more holistic, experiential, discussion-based and analysis-based learning. It also talks about a revision of the curriculum and pedagogical structure from a 10+2 system to a 5+3+3+4 system design in an effort to optimise learning for students based on cognitive development of children. On 29 July 2020, the cabinet approved a new National Education Policy with an aim to introduce several changes to the existing Indian education system. The Policy aims to make pre-primary education universal and places special emphasis on achieving foundational literacy/numeracy in primary school and beyond for all by 2025.

== Education system ==
Until 1976, under the Indian constitution, each state was responsible for the schools that fell under its governance; states possessed full power (Unless and otherwise a Conflict between Union govt). The state government had jurisdiction over creating and implementing education policies.

After the 42nd Amendment of the Constitution of India was passed in 1976, education fell under the concurrent list, which allowed the federal government (also known as the central government) to recommend education policies and programmes, even if state governments continued to wield extensive autonomy in implementing these programmes. In a country as large as India, with 28 states and eight union territories, this has created vast differences between states' policies, plans, programmes, and initiatives relating to school education.

=== Private schooling ===
State and local government bodies manage the majority of primary and upper primary schools, and the number of government-managed elementary schools is growing. However, the number of privately managed schools is steadily increasing. In 2005–2006, 83.13% of schools offering elementary education (Grades 1–8) were managed by government, and 16.86% of schools were under private management (excluding children in unrecognised schools, schools established under the Education Guarantee Scheme and in alternative learning centres).

Of the privately managed schools, one-third receive government aid. Enrolment in Grades 1–8 is shared between government and privately managed schools in the ratio 73:27. However, in rural areas this ratio is higher (80:20), and in urban areas much lower (36:66). At the school level, data on enrolment, infrastructure, and teacher availability is collected through the Unified District Information System for Education (UDISE+).

Demand for private schools has been growing over the years. While a consensus over what is the most significant driver of this growth in private schooling has not yet emerged, some authors have attributed this to:

- A higher demand for English-medium education
- A dissatisfaction with the quality of public schools
- Greater affordability of private schools
- Non-availability of the preferred field of study in government schools

After the adoption of the Right to Education (RTE) Act 2009, private schools were required to be 'government-recognized'. A private school would be eligible for government recognition when it met certain conditions.

At the primary and secondary level, India has a large private school system complementing the government-run schools, with 29% of students receiving private education in the 6 to 14 age group. Certain post-secondary technical schools are also private.

The private education market in India had a revenue of US$450 million in 2008, but is projected to be a US$40 billion market. Private schools are highly regulated in terms of what they can teach and in what form they can operate (they must be a non-profit to run any accredited educational institution).

=== Literacy and enrollment ===
In the 2011 Census, about 73% of the population was reported to be literate, with 81% for males and 65% for females. National Statistical Commission surveyed literacy to be 77.7% in 2017–18, 84.7% for males and 70.3% for females. This compares to 1981 when the respective rates were 41%, 53%, and 29%. In 1951 the rates were 18%, 27% and 9%.

India's improved education system is often cited as one of the main contributors to its economic development. Much of the progress, especially in higher education and scientific research, has been credited to various public institutions. While enrolment in higher education has increased steadily over the past decade, reaching a Gross Enrolment Ratio (GER) of 26.3% in 2019, however is quite low compared to tertiary education enrolment levels of developed nations.

As per the Annual Status of Education Report (ASER) 2012, 96.5% of all rural children between the ages of 6–14 were enrolled in school. This trend of high enrollment has continued consistently since the mid-2000s. Between 2007 and 2014, India maintained an average school enrolment rate of 95% for children aged 6–14, according to ASER reports. As an outcome, the number of students in the age group 6–14 who are not enrolled in school has come down to 2.8% in the academic year 2018 (ASER 2018). Another report from 2013 stated that there were 229 million students enrolled in different accredited urban and rural schools of India, from Class I to XII, indicating a steady growth, including a 19% increase in enrollment of girls since 2002.

While India is moving toward universal enrollment, concerns remain about the quality of education, especially in government-run schools. While more than 95 percent of children attend primary school, just 40 percent of Indian adolescents attend secondary school (Grades 9–12).

Since 2000, the World Bank has committed over $2 billion to support India's efforts in improving educational infrastructure and learning outcomes. Teacher absenteeism remains a significant challenge, with studies indicating that nearly 25% of teachers may be absent on any given day. States of India have introduced tests and education assessment system to identify and improve such schools. The Human Rights Measurement Initiative finds that India is achieving only 79.0% of what should be possible at its level of income for the right to education.

In January 2019, India had over 900 universities and 40,000 colleges. In India's higher education system, a significant number of seats are reserved under affirmative action policies for the historically disadvantaged Scheduled Castes and Scheduled Tribes and Other Backward Classes. In universities, colleges, and similar institutions affiliated with the central government, there is a maximum of 50% of reservations applicable to these disadvantaged groups, at the state level it can vary. Maharashtra had 73% reservations in 2014, which is the highest percentage of reservations in India.

== Primary and secondary education ==
The National Education Policy 2020 introduced the 5+3+3+4 education structure in India, where students will spend five years in the foundational stage, three years in the preparatory stage, three years in the middle stage, and four years in the secondary stage, with a focus on holistic development and critical thinking. However, educational practices can vary across different states and education boards in India.

=== Pre-primary ===
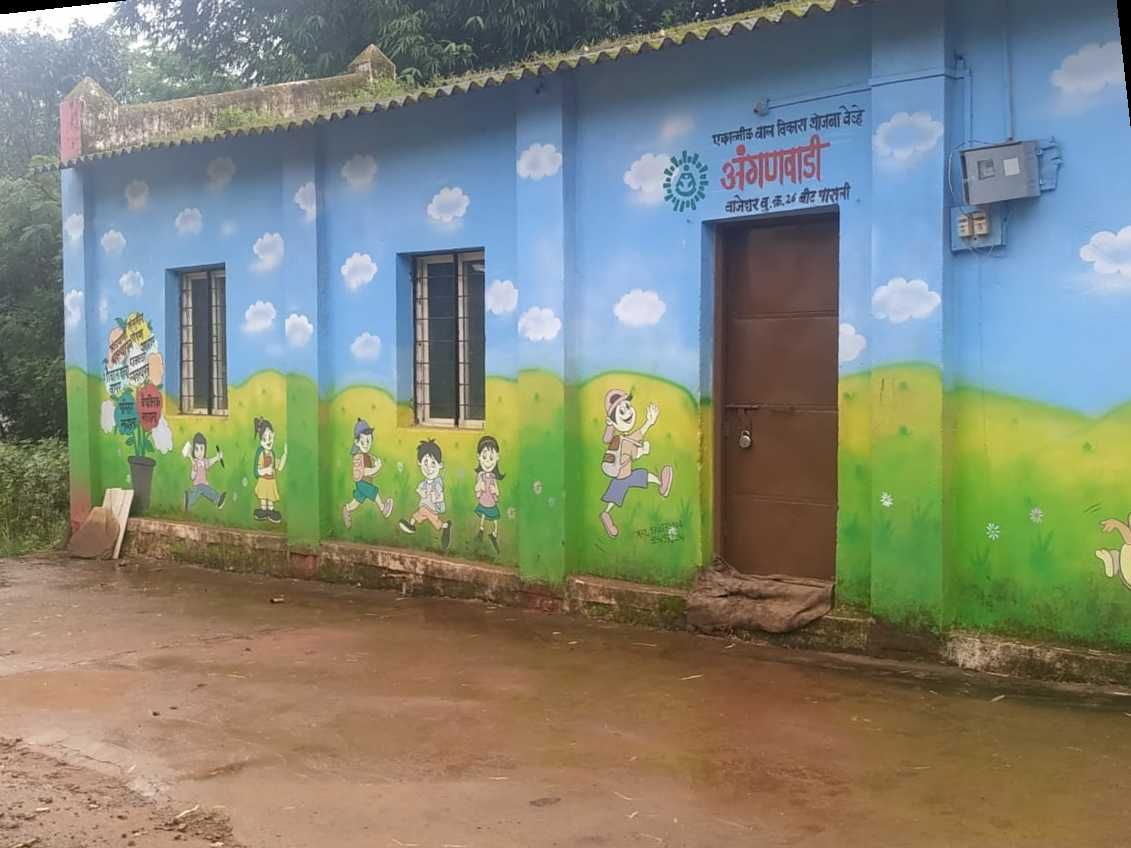
Anganwadi centre at Velhe, Pune district, 2019

The pre-primary stage includes pre-school and kindergarten education for children aged 3 to 6 years, focusing on early childhood development and prepares children for formal schooling. This stage is optional and not protected as a fundamental right. Pre-primary schools are rarely available in rural villages, with most schools in urban cities. 1% of India's population under the age of 6 is enrolled in preschool education.

- Play group (pre-nursery): Children are usually enrolled when they are 2–3 years old, and are exposed to basic activities that encourage independence, socialisation, and hygiene. Anganwadi is a government-funded free rural childcare and parental education programme that also incorporates the free Midday Meal Scheme.
- Nursery: Begins when children are 3–4 years old, and help children reach crucial developmental milestones.
- Lower Kindergarten (LKG): Also known as the junior kindergarten (jr. kg) stage. The age range for admission in LKG is 4 to 5 years.
- Upper Kindergarten (UKG): It is also called the senior kindergarten (Sr. kg) stage. The age range for admission in UKG is 5 to 6 years.

=== Primary ===
Primary education is typically divided into lower primary (Class I-V), and upper primary (Class VI-VIII). The main subjects taught during this stage include: mathematics, science, social science, languages (usually English and a regional language or a foreign language), physical education and training, value education.

80% of all recognised elementary schools are government-run or supported. Figures released by the Indian government in 2011 show that there were 5,816,673 elementary school teachers in India. As of March 2012, there were 2,127,000 secondary school teachers in India. Education has also been made free for children for 6 to 14 years of age or up to class VIII under the Right of Children to Free and Compulsory Education Act 2009. While school enrollment rates have increased, many children leave school with poor literacy and numeracy skills. ASER reported in 2019 that only 50% of fifth standard students in rural India could read a Standard II-level text, and only 29% of them could do basic division.

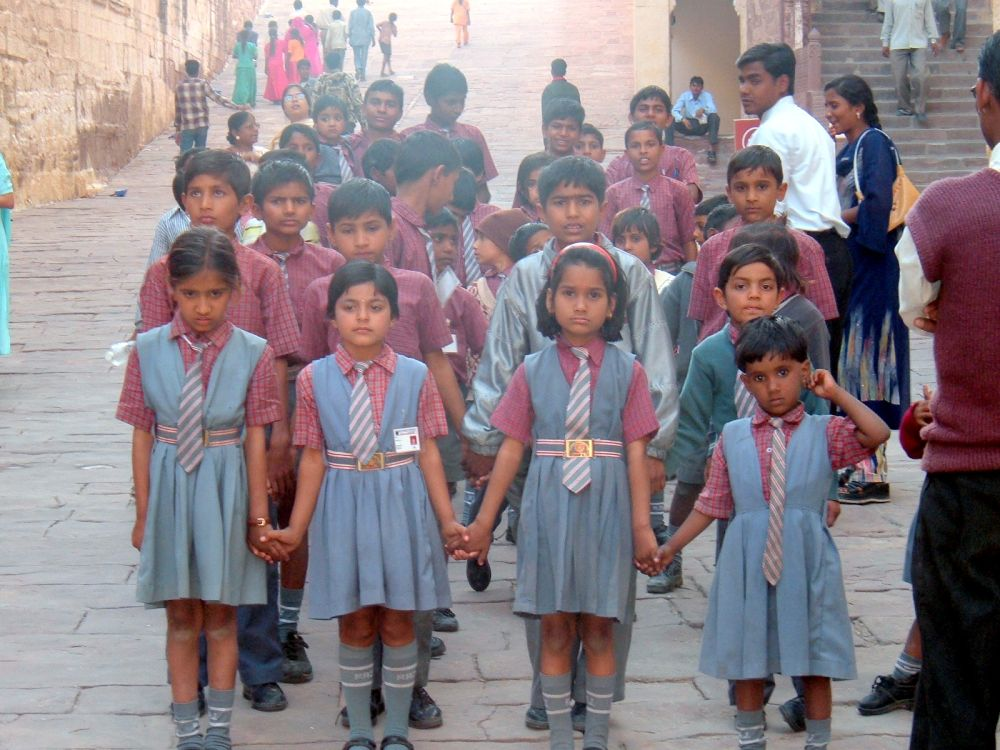
Indian school-children at a school in Jodhpur, Rajasthan

==== Challenges ====
However, due to a shortage of resources and lack of political will, this system suffers from massive gaps including high pupil to teacher ratios, shortage of infrastructure and poor levels of teacher training. Some scholars have used the concept of "visibility" to explain why successive governments have underprioritised investments directed at raising the quality of teaching and education in India relative to investments in building more schools. Building schools is more "visible" to the voting public and easily attributable to the government; training teachers to teach better and raising the quality of education is a more uncertain venture, the success of which is determined by factors outside the control of any one government. This incentivises governments to focus their resources on "visible" areas of intervention.

There have been several efforts to enhance quality made by the government. The District Education Revitalisation Programme (DERP) was launched in 1994 with an aim to universalise primary education in India by reforming and vitalising the existing primary education system. 85% of the DERP was funded by the central government and the remaining 15% was funded by the states. The DERP, which had opened 160,000 new schools including 84,000 alternative education schools delivering alternative education to approximately 3.5 million children, was also supported by UNICEF and other international programmes. "Corruption hurts the poor disproportionately – by diverting funds intended for development, undermining a government's ability to provide basic services, feeding inequality and injustice, and discouraging foreign investment and aid" (Kofi Annan, in his statement on the adoption of the United Nations Convention against Corruption by the General Assembly, NY, November 2003). In January 2016, Kerala became the 1st Indian state to achieve 100% primary education through its literacy programme Athulyam.

This primary education scheme has also shown a high gross enrolment ratio of 93–95% for the last three years in some states. Significant improvement in staffing and enrolment of girls has also been made as a part of this scheme. The scheme for universalisation of Education for All is the Sarva Shiksha Abhiyan which is one of the largest education initiatives in the world. While school enrolment rates have increased, the quality of education received by students remains low. The literature suggests that one of the biggest reasons for quality deficiencies in primary and secondary education is teacher absence and negligence. In one popular study, the researchers made unannounced visits to 3700 schools in 20 major Indian states, where they found that, on average, 25% of government primary school teachers absent every day. In another study, although it was found that three-quarters of the teachers were in attendance in the government primary schools that were inspected, only half of them were found teaching.

=== High school ===
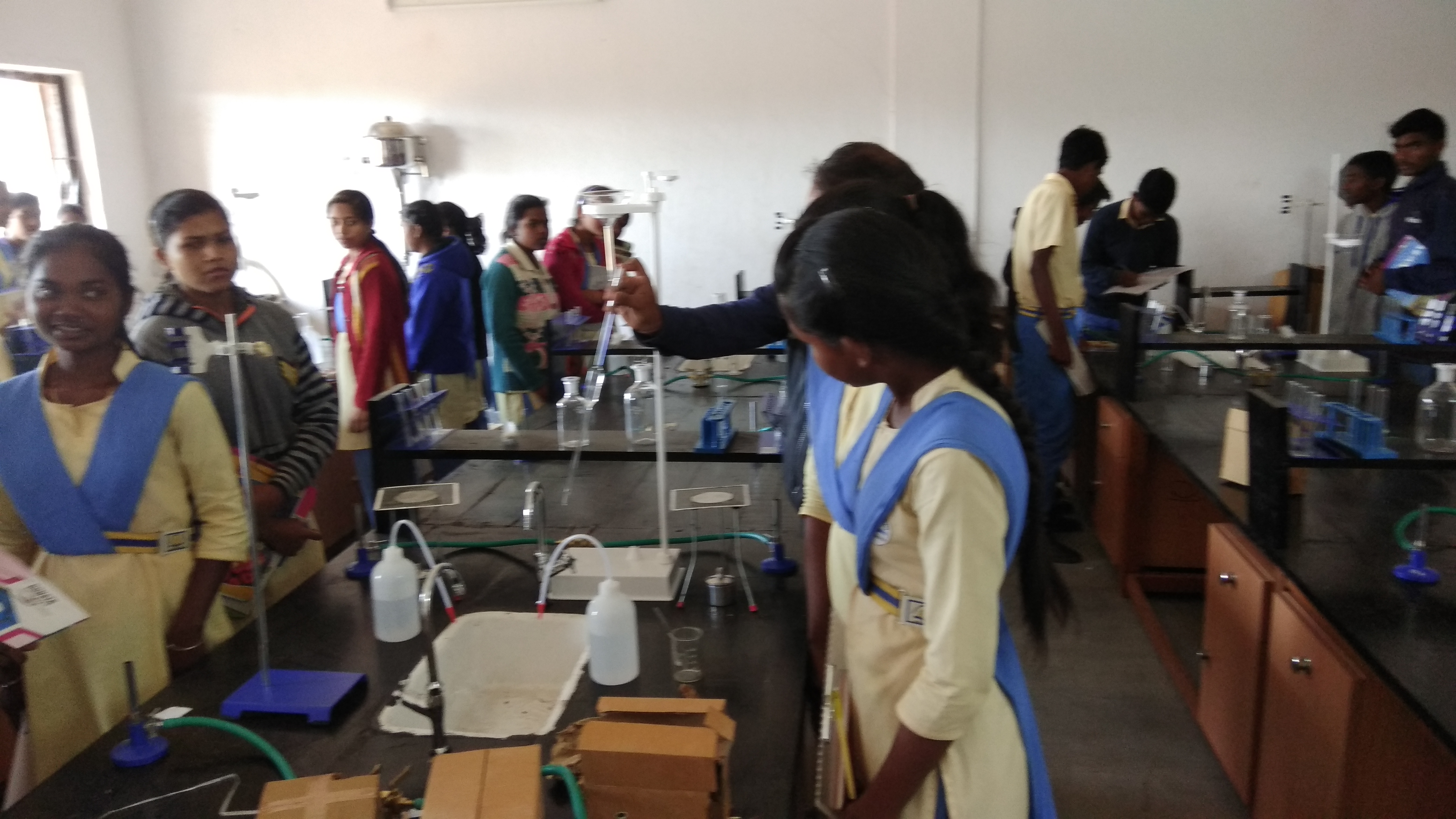
Secondary school students in a chemistry lab at a school in Odisha

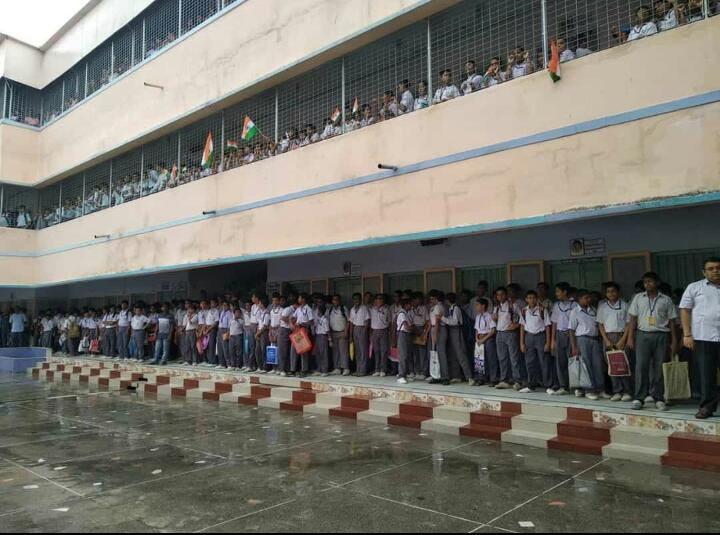
Independence Day celebration at a school in Baranagar

Secondary education covers children aged 14 to 18, a group comprising 88.5 million children according to the 2001 Census of India. The final two years of secondary is often called Higher Secondary (HS), Senior Secondary, Intermediate or simply the "+2" stage. The two-halves of secondary education are each an important stage for which a pass certificate is needed, and thus are affiliated by boards of education under education ministry, before one can pursue higher education, including college or professional courses.

UGC, NCERT, CBSE and ICSE directives state qualifying ages for candidates who wish to take the standardised exams. Those at least 15 years old by 30 May for a given academic year are eligible to appear for Secondary School certificate exams, and those 17 by the same date are eligible to appear for Higher Secondary certificate exams. It is further stated that upon successful completion of Higher Secondary, one can apply to higher education under UGC control.

Secondary education in India is examination-oriented and not course-based: students register for and take classes primarily to prepare for one of the centrally-administered examinations. Secondary school is split into 2 parts (grades 8–10 and grades 11–12) with a standardised nationwide examination at the end of grade 10 and grade 12 (colloquially referred to as "board exams"). Grade 10 examination results can be used for admission into grades 11–12 at a secondary school, pre-university programme, or a vocational or technical school. Passing the grade 12 board examination leads to the granting of a secondary school completion diploma, which may be used for admission into vocational schools or universities in the country or the world.

Most schools in India do not offer subject and scheduling flexibility due to budgeting constraints (for example, students in India are often not allowed to take Chemistry and History together in grades 11–12 as they are part of different "streams"). Private candidates (that is, not studying in a school) are generally not allowed to register for, and take board examinations, but there are some exceptions such as NIOS.

Students taking the grade 10 examination usually take five or six subjects: Two languages (at least one of them being English/Hindi), Mathematics, Science (often taught as three separate disciplines: physics, chemistry and biology; but assessed as a single subject), Social Sciences (consisting of four components assessed as a single subject: history, geography, economics and political science), and one optional subject depending on the availability of teachers. Elective or optional subjects often include computer applications, information technology, physical education, commerce, economics, painting, music and home science.

Students taking the grade 12 examination usually take five or six subjects with English or the local language being compulsory. Students re-enrolling in most secondary schools after grade 10 have to make the choice of choosing subjects from a "core stream" in addition to the language: Science (Mathematics, Biology, Physics, Chemistry, Computer Science, Biotechnology, Physical Education), Commerce (Accountancy, Business Studies, Economics, Entrepreneurship, Informatics Practices, Marketing, Retail, Financial Market Management), or Humanities (History, Political Science, Sociology, Psychology, Geography, Legal Studies, Fine Arts, Music, Dance) depending on the school. Students with the Science stream study mathematics up to single-variable calculus in grade 12.

Most reputable universities in India require students to pass college-administered admissions tests in addition to passing a final secondary school examination for entry into a college or university. School grades are usually not sufficient for college admissions in India. Popular entrance tests include JEE, NEET and the recent CUET.

==== Secondary / Lower Secondary / Matriculation Education ====
Secondary education covers Classes VIII, IX and X (Grades 8–10), usually from ages 13 to 16. Students are exposed to a wider range of subjects, including additional languages, arts, and vocational subjects in addition to the usual English, math, science, social science, computer science physical ed., value education. At the end of class X, students often appear for a standardised board examination like the Secondary School Leaving Certificate Examination / Secondary School Certificate (SSLC / SSC) conducted by the respective state education boards or All India Secondary School Examination (AISSE) conducted by the Central Board of Secondary Education (CBSE) or the Indian Certificate of Secondary Education (ICSE) examination conducted by the Council for the Indian School Certificate Examinations (CISCE).
Secondary school education in India is commonly known as "high school" or "secondary school". These terms are widely used across the country to refer to the stage of education that follows primary education and precedes higher secondary education.

==== Senior Secondary / Higher Secondary / Intermediate Education ====
After completing secondary education, students move on to higher secondary education, which includes classes XI and XII (Grades 11–12). They typically specialise in one of three streams: Science, Commerce, or Humanities/Arts. The curriculum becomes more focused on specific subjects related to the chosen stream with a few subjects in common and compulsory such as physical education, work experience, value education and art or related. At the end of class XII, students generally appear for board examinations such as the Higher Secondary Certificate Examination conducted by the respective state boards or All India Senior School Certificate Examination (AISSCE) conducted by CBSE or the Indian School Certificate (ISC) examination conducted by CISCE.

The terminology used to describe higher secondary education varies between states in India. Some commonly used terms include intermediate education in Andhra Pradesh, Telangana, Bihar, Uttarakhand, and Uttar Pradesh; higher secondary education (HSE) in Assam, Maharashtra, Kerala, and Tamil Nadu; senior secondary education (SSE) in Haryana, Punjab, and Rajasthan; and pre-university education (PUC) in Karnataka. These terms represent the educational stage following secondary education and indicate the diverse terminology used in different states across the country. The curriculum for these streams may vary based on the board of education or state education board.

After completing the 12th grade, students can also pursue higher education in universities or specialised institutions depending on their chosen stream and career aspirations.

==== Pre-university course or intermediate education ====
In certain states in India, such as Karnataka and Andhra Pradesh, the education system includes a two-year pre-university course (PUC) after the completion of secondary education (10th grade). The PUC is commonly referred to as junior college. Students typically enroll in pre-university colleges to pursue their intermediate education, which acts as a bridge between high school and university. The pre-university system allows students to choose from three major streams of study:

Science: This stream focuses on subjects such as Physics, Chemistry, Biology, Mathematics, and Computer Science.
Commerce: This stream includes subjects like Accountancy, Economics, Business Studies, and Mathematics.
Arts/Humanities: Students in this stream study subjects like History, Political Science, Sociology, Economics, and Languages.

Upon completing their pre-university education, students can choose to pursue higher education at universities, professional colleges, or other specialised institutions. In the rest of the states in India, including the central education boards like CBSE (Central Board of Secondary Education) and CISCE (Council for the Indian School Certificate Examinations), the education system follows a 10+2 format. It consists of ten years of primary and secondary education (up to the 10th grade) followed by two years of higher secondary education (11th and 12th grade).

==== Vocational education ====
In addition to the regular academic curriculum, vocational education is offered at various stages to provide specific skills and training in fields such as engineering, information technology, hospitality, healthcare, and more. Vocational courses are available at both the secondary and higher secondary levels.

Educational practices, syllabus, and examinations may vary depending on the education board, such as CBSE, CISCE, state boards, or international boards. Additionally, there are alternative education systems in India, such as the International Baccalaureate (IB) and Cambridge International Examinations (CIE), which follow different curricula and assessment methods.

== Higher education in India ==
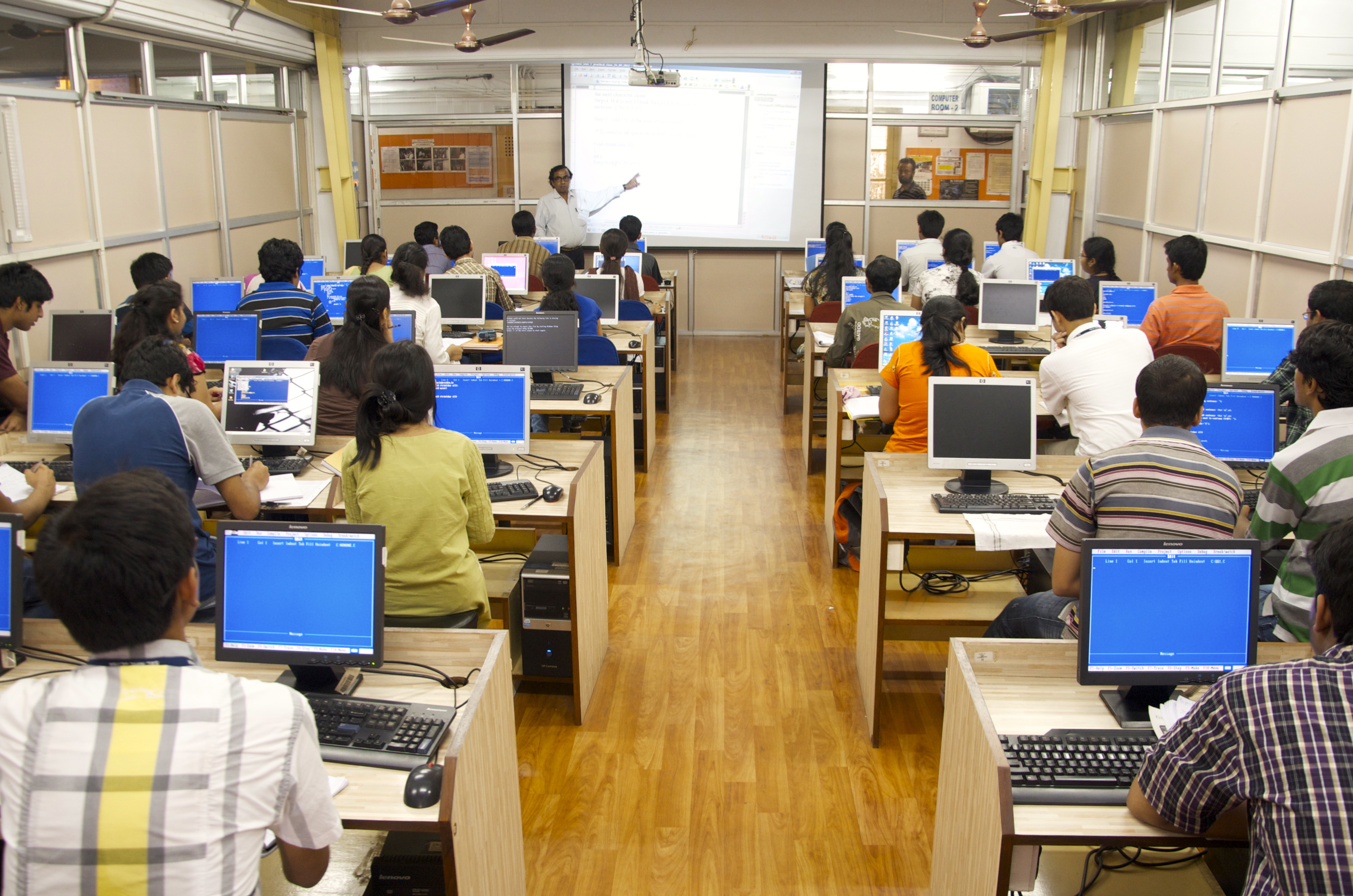
Computer class at a college in Kolkata

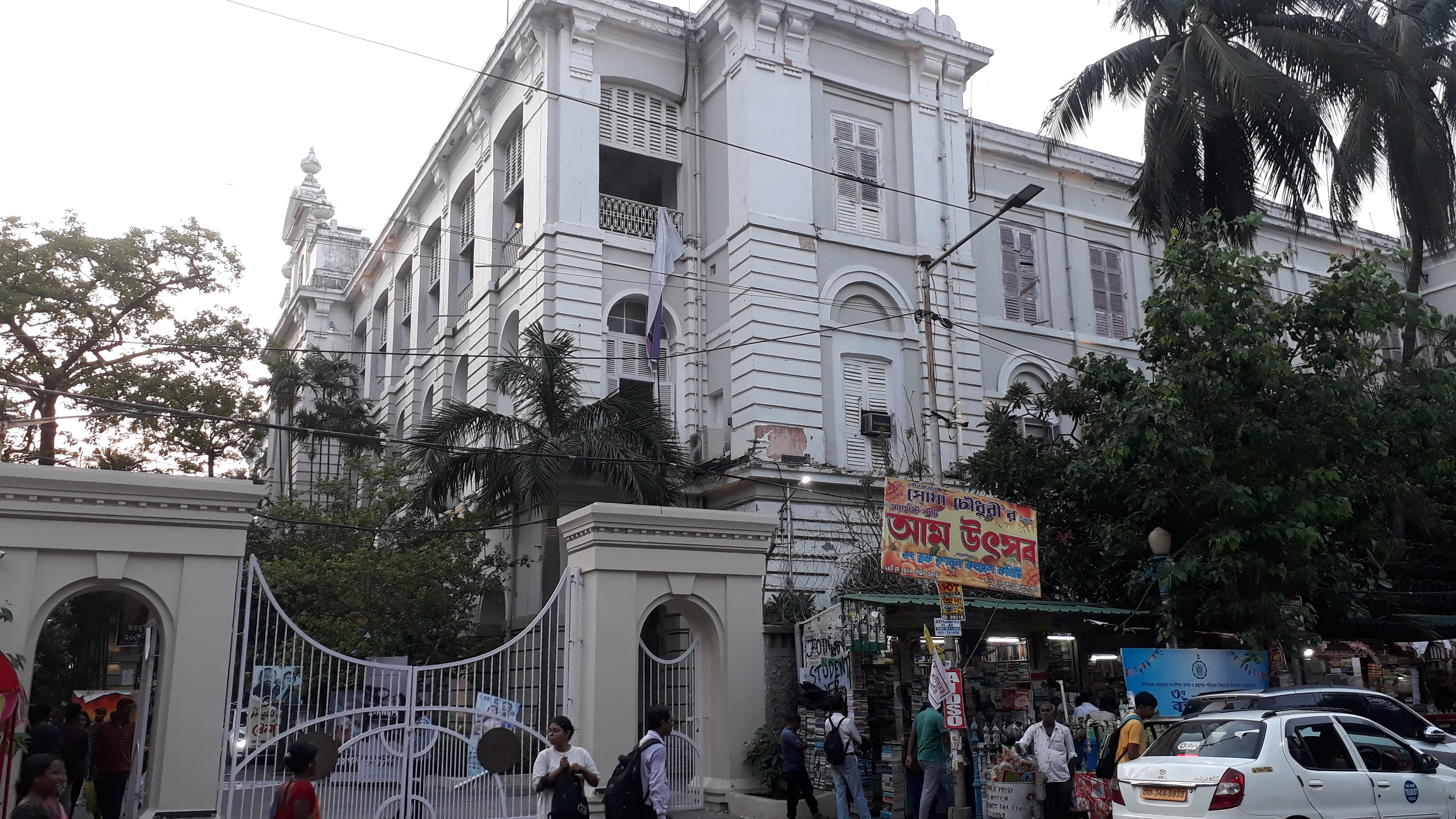
Presidency University (formerly Presidency College) is one of the first institutes of Western-type higher education in Asia, established in 1817.

In India, Students may opt for vocational education or university education.

=== Vocational education ===
India's All India Council of Technical Education (AICTE) reported, in 2013, that there are more than 4,599 vocational institutions that offer degrees, diploma and post-diploma in architecture, engineering, hotel management, infrastructure, pharmacy, technology, town services and others. There were 1,740,000 students enrolled in these schools. Total annual intake capacity for technical diplomas and degrees exceeded 3.4 million in 2012.

According to the University Grants Commission (UGC) total enrolment in Science, Medicine, Agriculture and Engineering crossed 65 lakh in 2010. The number of women choosing engineering has more than doubled since 2001.

=== Tertiary education ===
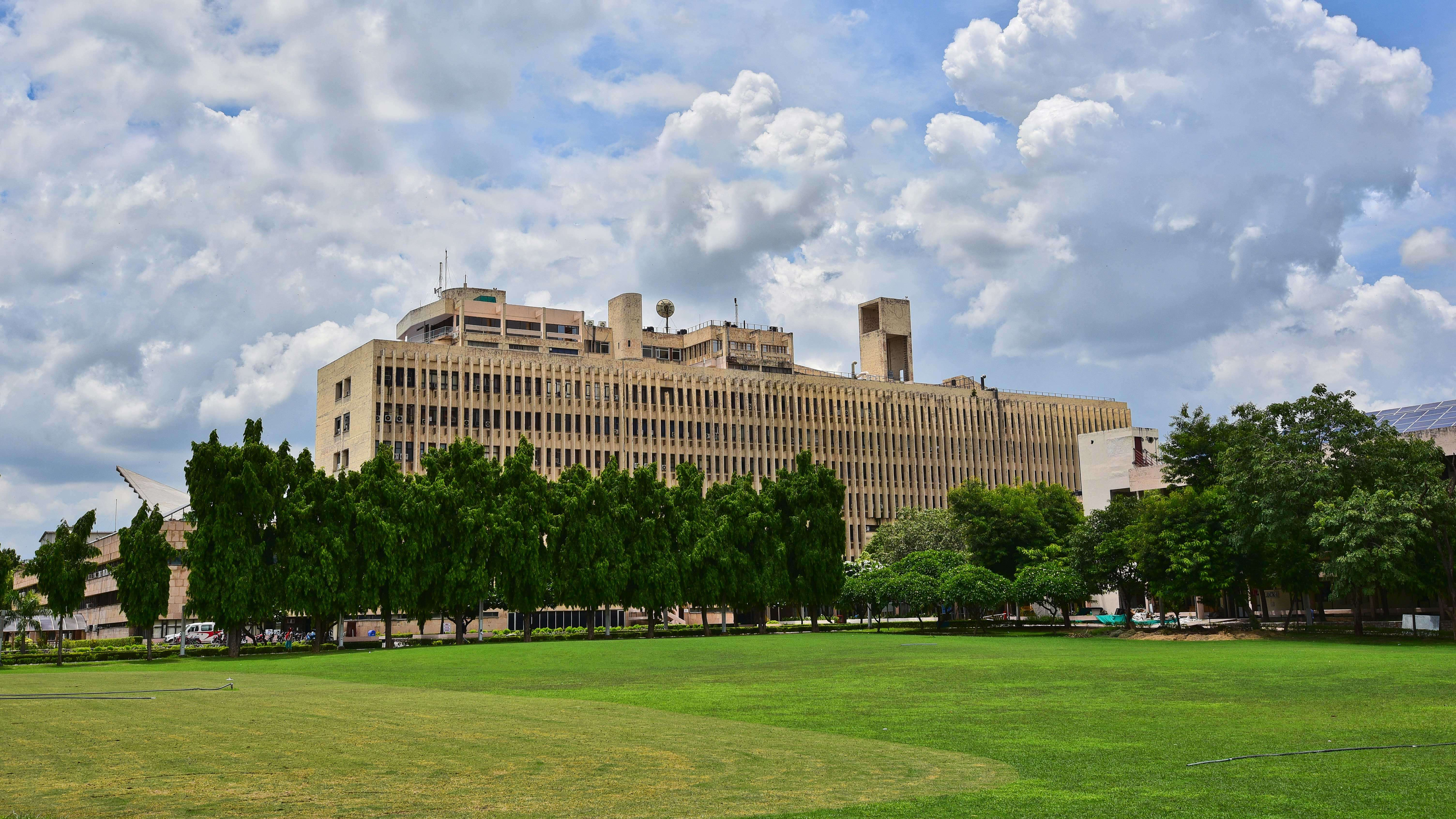
Indian Institute of Technology Delhi

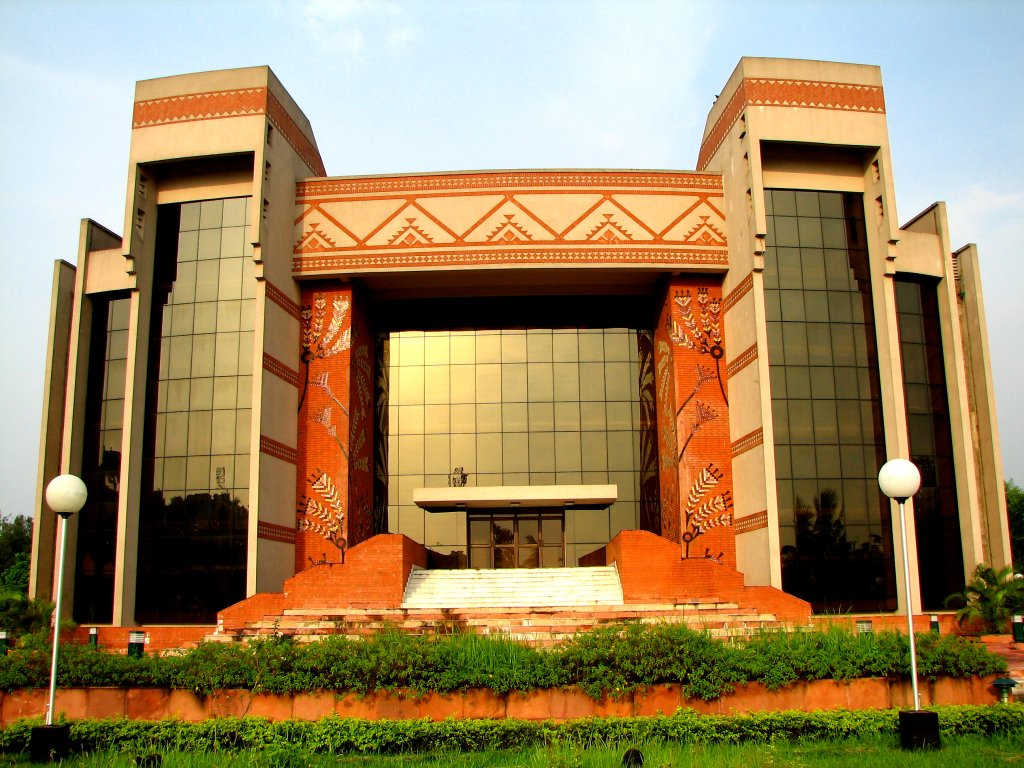
Indian Institute of Management Calcutta, Kolkata

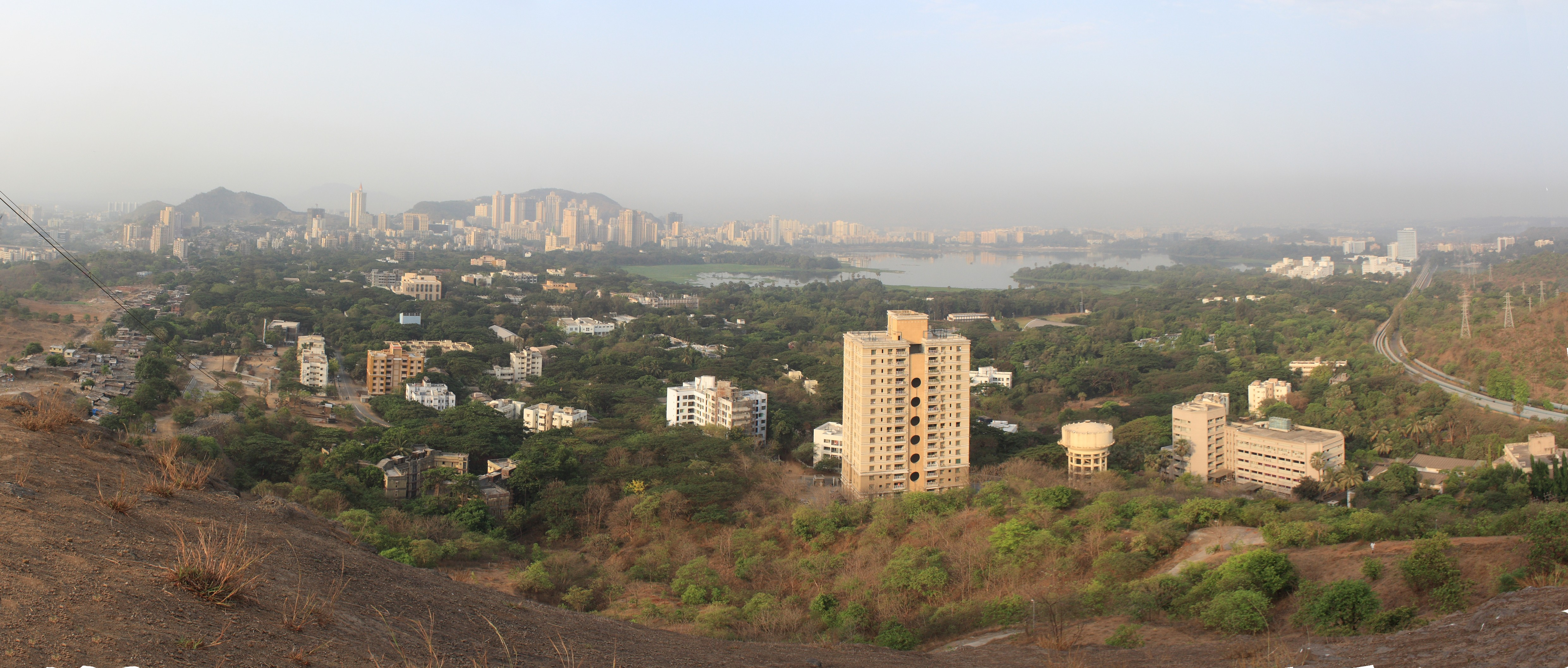
Indian Institute of Technology Bombay, Mumbai

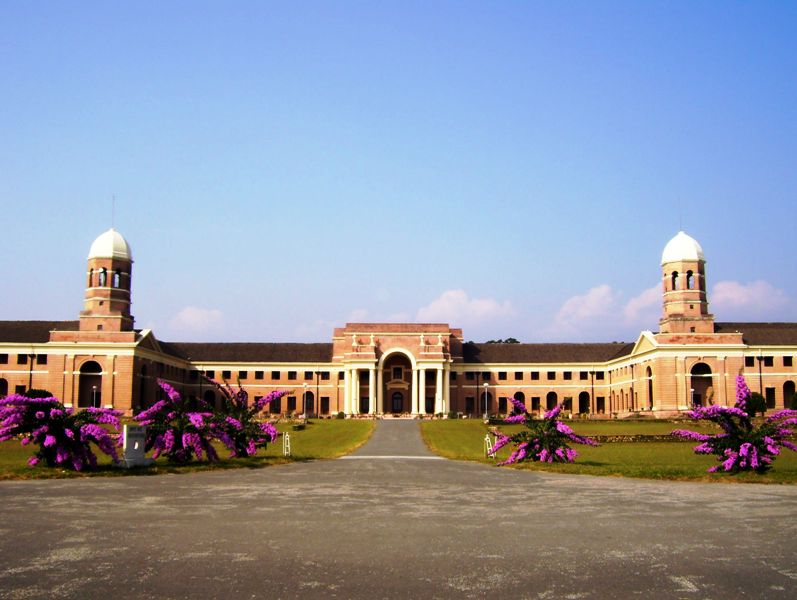
Forest Research Institute

After passing the Higher Secondary Examination (the Standard 12 examination), students may enroll in general degree programmes such as bachelor's degree (graduation) in arts, commerce or science, or professional degree programme such as engineering, medicine, nursing, pharmacy, and law graduates. India's higher education system is the third largest in the world, after China and the United States. The main governing body at the tertiary level is the University Grants Commission (India) (UGC), which enforces its standards, advises the government, and helps co-ordinate between the centre and the state up to Post graduation and Doctorate (PhD). Accreditation for higher learning is overseen by 12 autonomous institutions established by the University Grants Commission. The Accreditation is seen by the National Assessment and Accreditation Council. The Management & Accreditation of Technical Education like Engineering, Management and Similar Education course are overseen by the All India Council for Technical Education.

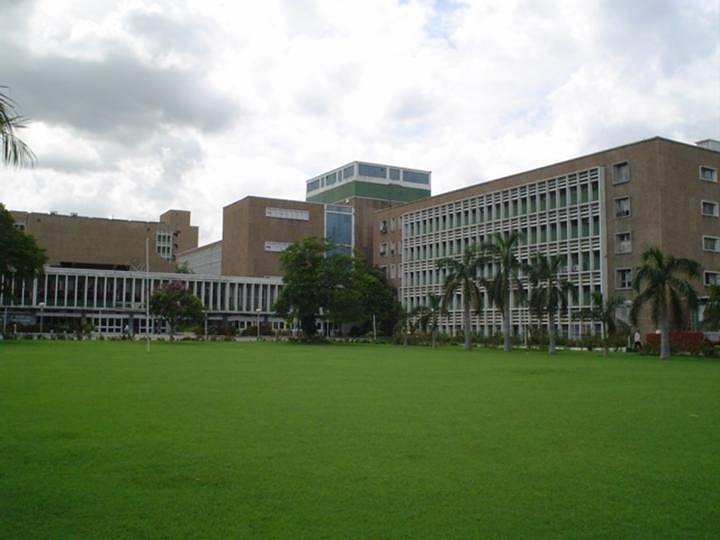
All India Institute of Medical Sciences Delhi

As of 2012, India has 152 central universities, 316 state universities, and 191 private universities. Other institutions include 33,623 colleges, including 1,800 exclusive women's colleges, functioning under these universities and institutions, and 12,748 Institutions offering Diploma Courses. The emphasis in the tertiary level of education lies on science and technology. Indian educational institutions by 2004 consisted of a large number of technology institutes. Distance learning is also a feature of the Indian higher education system. The Government has launched Rashtriya Uchchattar Shiksha Abhiyan to provide strategic funding to State higher and technical institutions. A total of 316 state public universities and 13,024 colleges will be covered under it.

Some institutions of India, such as the Indian Institutes of Technology (IITs) and National Institutes of Technology (NITs) have been globally acclaimed for their standard of under-graduate education in engineering. Several other institutes of fundamental research such as the Indian Institute of Science (IISc) Indian Association for the Cultivation of Science (IACS), Tata Institute of Fundamental Research (TIFR), Harish-Chandra Research Institute (HRI), Jawaharlal Nehru Centre for Advanced Scientific Research (JNCASR), Indian Institute of Science Education and Research (IISER) are also acclaimed for their standard of research in basic sciences and mathematics. However, India has failed to produce world class universities both in the private sector or the public sector.

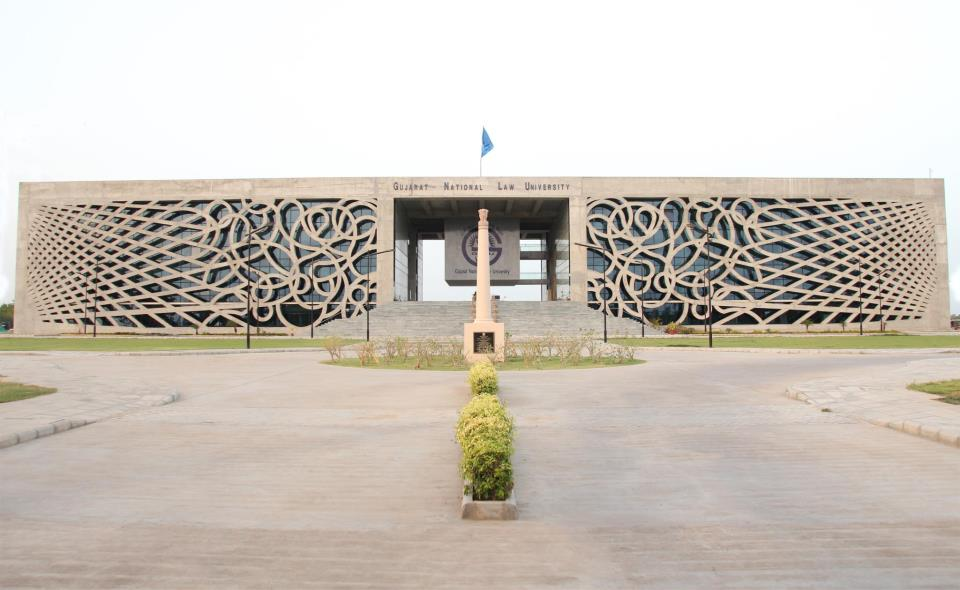
Gujarat National Law University, Gandhinagar

Three Indian universities were listed in the Times Higher Education list of the world's top 200 universities – Indian Institutes of Technology, Indian Institutes of Management, and Jawaharlal Nehru University in 2005 and 2006. Six Indian Institutes of Technology and the Birla Institute of Technology and Science—Pilani were listed among the top 20 science and technology schools in Asia by Asiaweek. The Indian School of Business situated in Hyderabad was ranked number 12 in global MBA rankings by the Financial Times of London in 2010 while the All India Institute of Medical Sciences has been recognised as a global leader in medical research and treatment. The University of Mumbai was ranked 41 among the Top 50 Engineering Schools of the world by America's news broadcasting firm Business Insider in 2012 and was the only university in the list from the five emerging BRICS nations viz Brazil, Russia, India, China and South Africa. It was ranked at 62 in the QS BRICS University rankings for 2013 and was India's 3rd best Multi-Disciplinary University in the QS University ranking of Indian Universities after University of Calcutta and Delhi University. In April 2015, IIT Bombay, Mumbai launched the first U.S.-India joint EMBA programme alongside Washington University in St. Louis.

=== Technical education ===
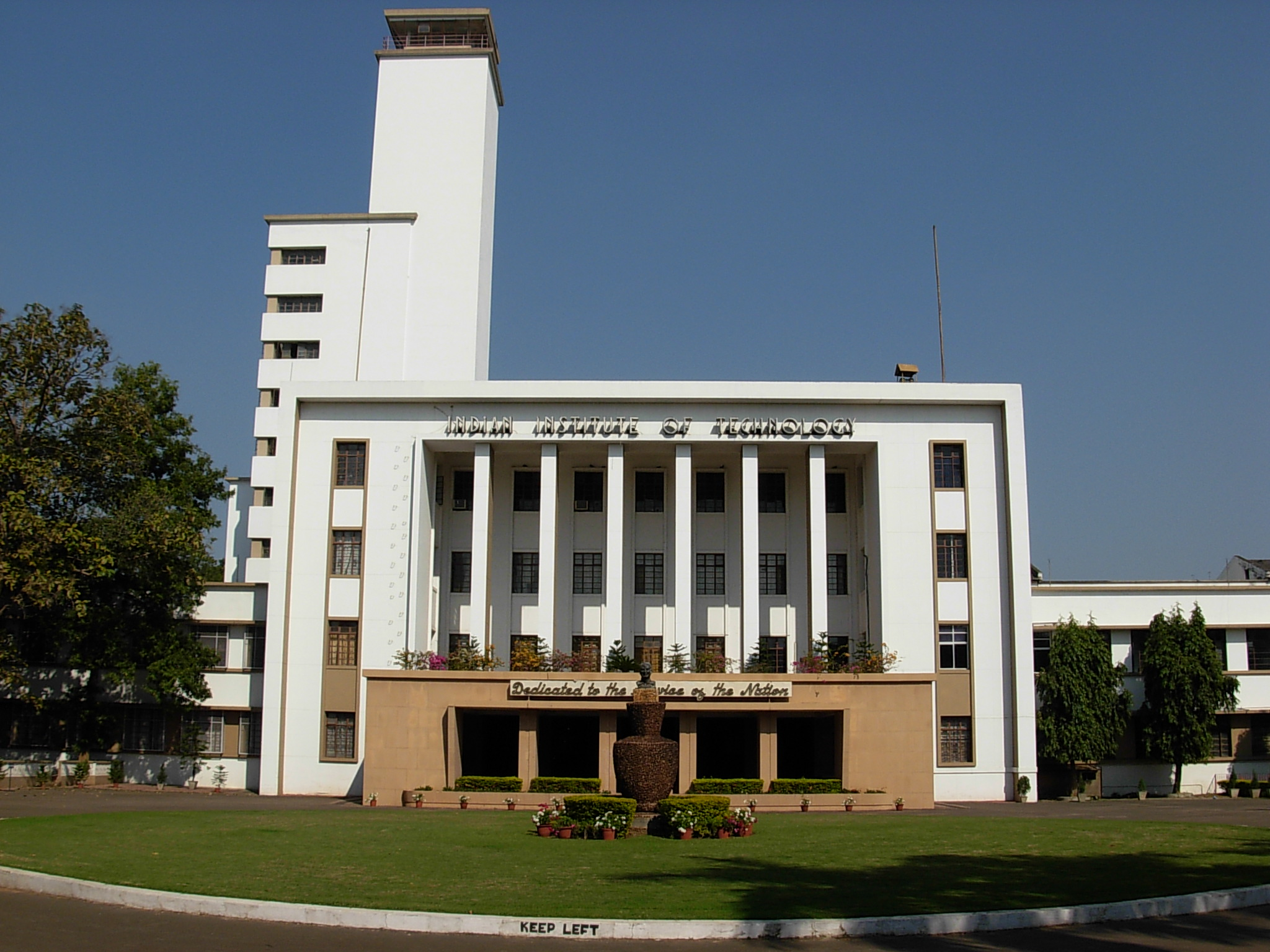
Indian Institute of Technology, Kharagpur

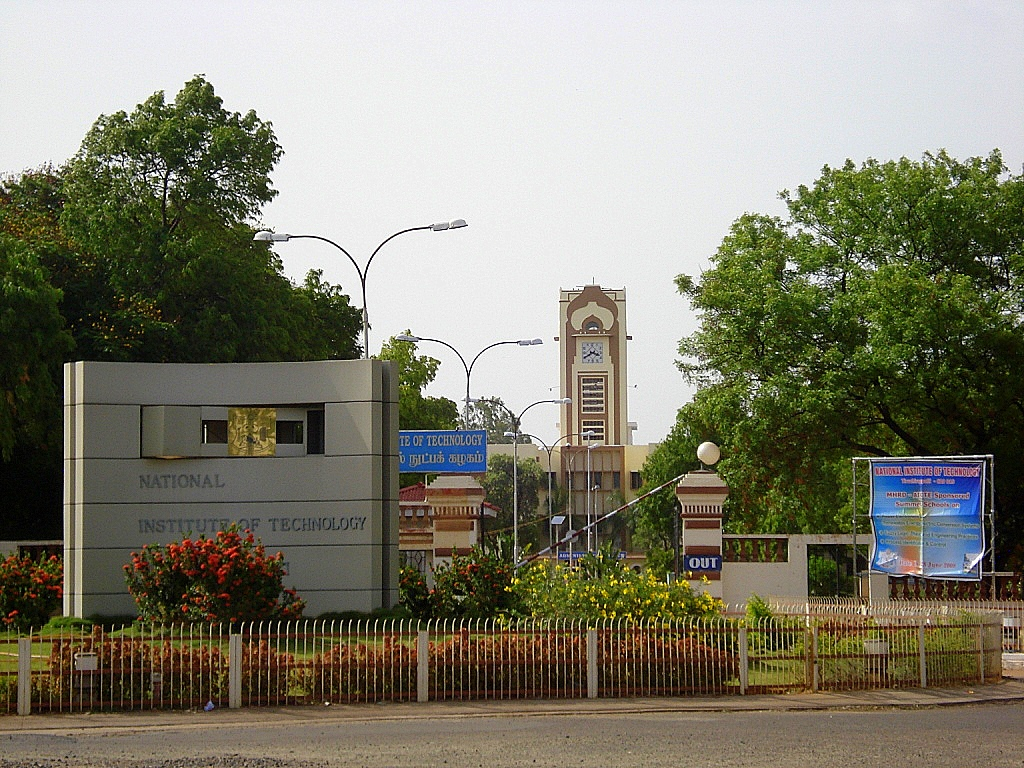
National Institute of Technology, Tiruchirappalli

From the first Five-year Plan onwards, India's emphasis was to develop a talent pool driven by strong scientific ability. India's National Policy on Education (NPE) provisioned for an apex body for regulation and development of higher technical education, which came into being as the All India Council for Technical Education (AICTE) in 1987 through an act of the Indian parliament. At the central level, the Indian Institutes of Technology, the Indian Institute of Space Science and Technology, the National Institutes of Technology and the Indian Institutes of Information Technology are deemed of national importance.

The Indian Institutes of Technology (IITs) and National Institutes of Technology (NITs) are among the nation's premier education facilities.

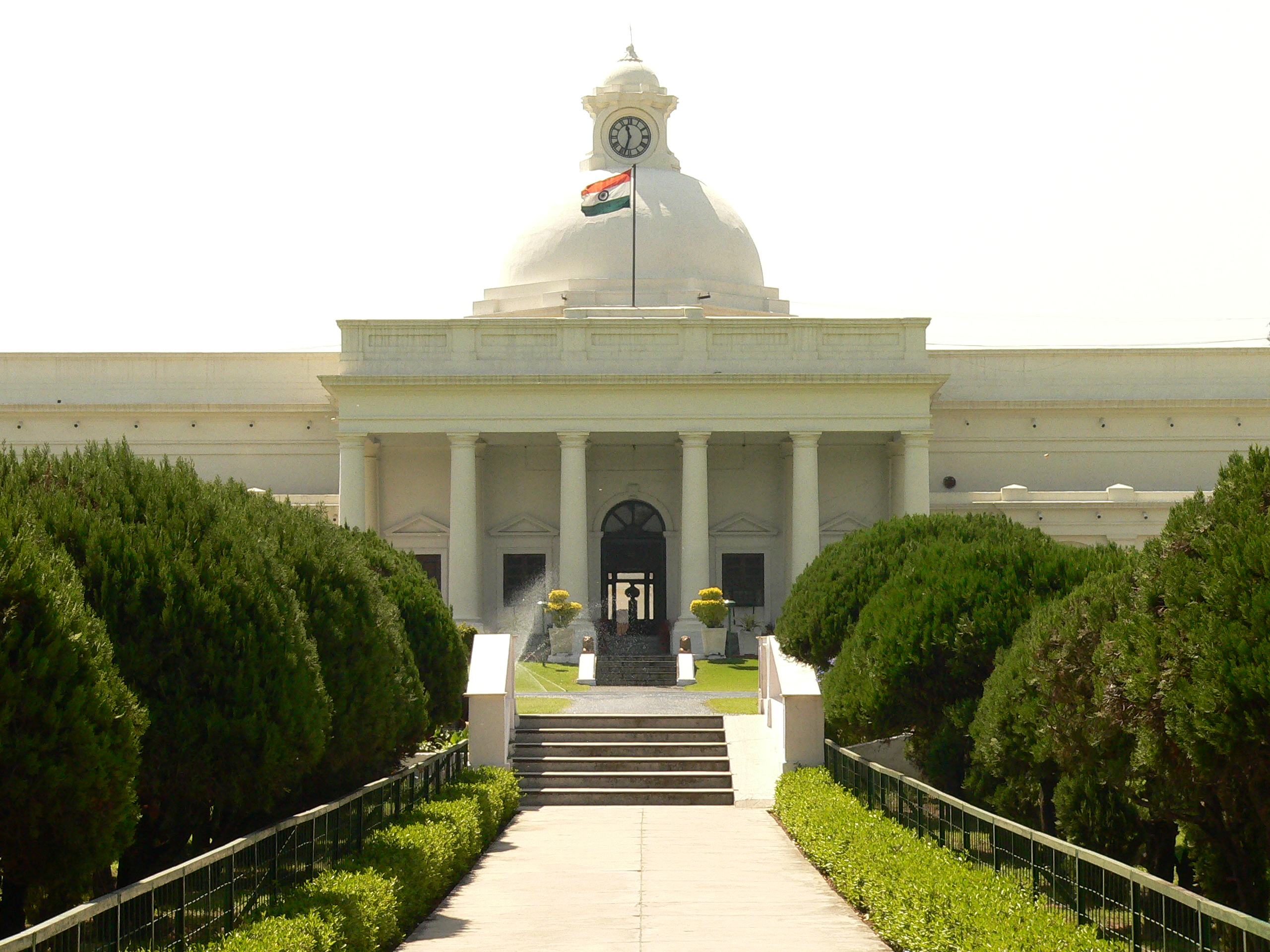
Indian Institute of Technology, Roorkee

<The UGC has inter-university centers at a number of locations throughout India to promote common research, e.g. the Nuclear Science Centre at the Jawaharlal Nehru University, New Delhi. Besides there are some British established colleges such as Harcourt Butler Technological Institute situated in Kanpur and King George Medical University situated in Lucknow which are important centre of higher education.

In addition to above institutes, efforts towards the enhancement of technical education are supplemented by a number of recognised Professional Engineering Societies such as:

1. Institution of Engineers (India)
2. Institution of Civil Engineers (India)
3. Institution of Mechanical Engineers (India)
4. Institution of Chemical Engineering (India)
5. Institution of Electronics and Tele-Communication Engineers (India)
6. Indian Institute of Metals
7. Institution of Industrial Engineers (India)
8. Institute of Town Planners (India)
9. Indian Institute of Architects

that conduct Engineering/Technical Examinations at different levels (Degree and diploma) for working professionals desirous of improving their technical qualifications.

The number of graduates from technical colleges increased to over 700,000 in 2011, compared to 550,000 in FY 2010. However, according to one study, 75% of technical graduates and more than 85% of general graduates lack the skills needed in India's most demanding and high-growth global industries such as Information Technology (IT). In 2009, less than 1% of India's labour pool was employed in the Indian IT industry (about 2.3 million people). That number has almost doubled as of 2023, with around 5.4 million people estimated to be employed in IT, however, given the rapid population growth in India, this still accounts for only 0.4% of the Indian labour pool. Given the sheer numbers of students seeking education in engineering, science and mathematics, India faces challenges balancing the huge demand for employment with the need to ensure quality graduates.

== Schooling system ==
Education in India is a Concurrent List subject, that is, both the Central Government of India and the state governments are responsible for enacting and implementing education policy. The central board and most of the state boards uniformly follow the "10+2" pattern of education. In this pattern, the first 10 years of a student's education is spent in schools, and the latter two years are in junior colleges (as they are known in the state of Maharashtra) or higher secondary schools (in most other states). Students wishing to pursue further education undergo 3 years of study for a bachelor's degree. The first 10 years is further subdivided into 8 years of elementary education (5 years Primary School and 3 years Middle School), 2 years of Secondary education followed by 2 years of Higher Secondary Schools or Junior colleges. This pattern originated from the recommendation of the Education Commission of 1964–66.

There are two types of educational institutions in India, 1) Recognised institutions – primary school, secondary school, special schools, intermediate schools, colleges and universities who follow courses as prescribed by universities or boards and are also open for inspection by these authorities, 2) Unrecognised Institutions, which do not fulfil conditions as stated for the recognised ones.

=== Administration ===
==== Policy ====
Education policy is prepared by the Central Government and State Governments at national and state levels respectively. The National Policy on Education (NPE), 1986, provided for environment awareness, science and technology education, and introduction of traditional elements such as Yoga into the Indian secondary school system. A significant feature of India's secondary school system is the emphasis on inclusion of the disadvantaged sections of the society. Professionals from established institutes are often called to support in vocational training. Another feature of India's secondary school system is its emphasis on profession based vocational training to help students attain skills for finding a vocation of his/her choosing. A significant new feature has been the extension of SSA to secondary education in the form of the Rashtriya Madhyamik Shiksha Abhiyan. Rashtriya Madhyamik Shiksha Abhiyan (RMSA) which is the most recent initiative of Government of India to achieve the goal of universalisation of secondary education (USE). It is aimed at expanding and improving the standards of secondary education up to class X.

==== Curriculum and school education boards ====
National Skill Development Agency (NSDA)'s National Skills Qualification Framework (NSQF), is a quality assurance framework which grades and recognises levels of skill based on the learning outcomes acquired through both formal or informal means.

School boards set the curriculum, conduct standardised exams mostly at 10th and 12th level to award the school diplomas. Exams at the remaining levels (also called standard, grade or class, denoting the years of schooling) are conducted by the schools.

- National Council of Educational Research and Training (NCERT): The NCERT is the apex body located in New Delhi, India's capital city. The council oversees the curriculums for school education across India. The NCERT provides support, guidance and technical assistance to a number of schools in India and oversees many aspects of enforcement of education policies. Curriculum bodies that govern state specific curriculum are known as SCERTs.
- State Government Boards of Education: Most state governments have at least one state board that oversees secondary school education. However, some states, like Andhra Pradesh have more than one, while the union territories, such as Chandigarh, Dadra and Nagar Haveli, Daman and Diu, Lakshadweep, and Puducherry, do not have a board, and instead share services with a larger state. The boards set curriculum from Grades 1 to 12 for affiliated schools. The curriculum varies from state to state and has more local appeal with examinations conducted in regional languages in addition to English – often considered less rigorous than national curricula such as CBSE or ICSE/ISC. Most of these conduct exams at 10th and 12th level, but some even at the 5th and 8th level.
- Central Board of Secondary Education (CBSE): The CBSE sets curriculum from Grades 9 to 12 for affiliated schools and conducts examinations at the 10th and 12th levels. Students studying the CBSE Curriculum take the All India Secondary School Examination (AISSE) at the end of grade 10 and All India Senior School Certificate Examination (AISSCE) at the end of grade 12. Examinations are offered in Hindi and English.
- Council for the Indian School Certificate Examinations (CISCE): CISCE sets curriculum from Grades 1 to 12 for affiliated schools and conducts three examinations, namely, the Indian Certificate of Secondary Education (ICSE – Class/Grade 10); The Indian School Certificate (ISC – Class/Grade 12) and the Certificate in Vocational Education (CVE – Class/Grade 12). CISCE English level has been compared to UK's A-Levels; this board offers more choices of subjects. CBSE exams at grade 10 and 12 have often been compared with ICSE and ISC examinations respectively. ICSE is generally considered to be more rigorous than the CBSE AISSE (grade 10) but the CBSE AISSCE and ISC examinations are almost on par with each other in most subjects with ISC including a slightly more rigorous English examination than the CBSE 12th grade examination. The CBSE and ISC are recognised internationally and most universities abroad accept the final results of CBSE and ISC exams for admissions purposes and as proof of completion of secondary school.
- National Institute of Open Schooling (NIOS): The NIOS conducts two examinations; the secondary examination and senior secondary examination (All India), and also some courses in Vocational Education. The National Board of Education is run by Government of India's Ministry of Human Resource Development (MHRD) to provide education in rural areas and challenged groups in open and distance education mode. A pilot project started by the CBSE, designed to provide quality, affordable education, educates students up until the 12th grade. The choice of subjects is highly customisable and the subjects are equivalent to CBSE subjects. Home-schooled students usually take NIOS or international curriculum examinations as they are ineligible to write CBSE or ISC exams.
- Hindu, vedic & Sanskrit education: The Maharshi Sandipani Rashtriya Veda Sanskrit Shiksha Board (MSRVSSB) is a national-level school education board which grants the Veda Bhushan (10th) and Veda Vibhushan (12th) certificates to students of affiliated schools. MSRVSSB certificates are accredited by the Association of Indian Universities (AIU) and AICTE as the recognised qualifications for admission into other tertiary institutions for a higher degree. Along with the modern subjects, the students are also taught Hindu scriptures, vedas, upnishads, ayurveda and sanskrit. Govt of India has granted legal authority to MSRVSSB to affiliate and recognise vedic and Sanskrit schools run by other organisations. MSRVSSB is run by the Maharishi Sandipani Rashtriya Ved Vidya Pratishthan (MSRVVP), which already runs several vedic school and MSRVSSB also accredit schools run by other organisations.
- Islamic madrasah: Their boards are controlled by local state governments, or autonomous, or affiliated with Darul Uloom Deoband or Darul Uloom Nadwtul Ulama.
- Autonomous schools: Such as Woodstock School, Sri Aurobindo International Centre of Education Puducherry, Patha Bhavan and Ananda Marga Gurukula.
- International Baccalaureate (IB) and Cambridge International Examinations (CAIE): These are generally private schools that have dual affiliation with one of the school education board of India as well as affiliated to the International Baccalaureate (IB) Programme or the Cambridge International Examinations (CAIE).
- International schools, which offer 10th and 12th standard examinations under the International Baccalaureate, Cambridge Senior Secondary Examination systems or under their home nations school boards (such as run by foreign embassies or the expat communities).

==== Midday Meal Scheme ====
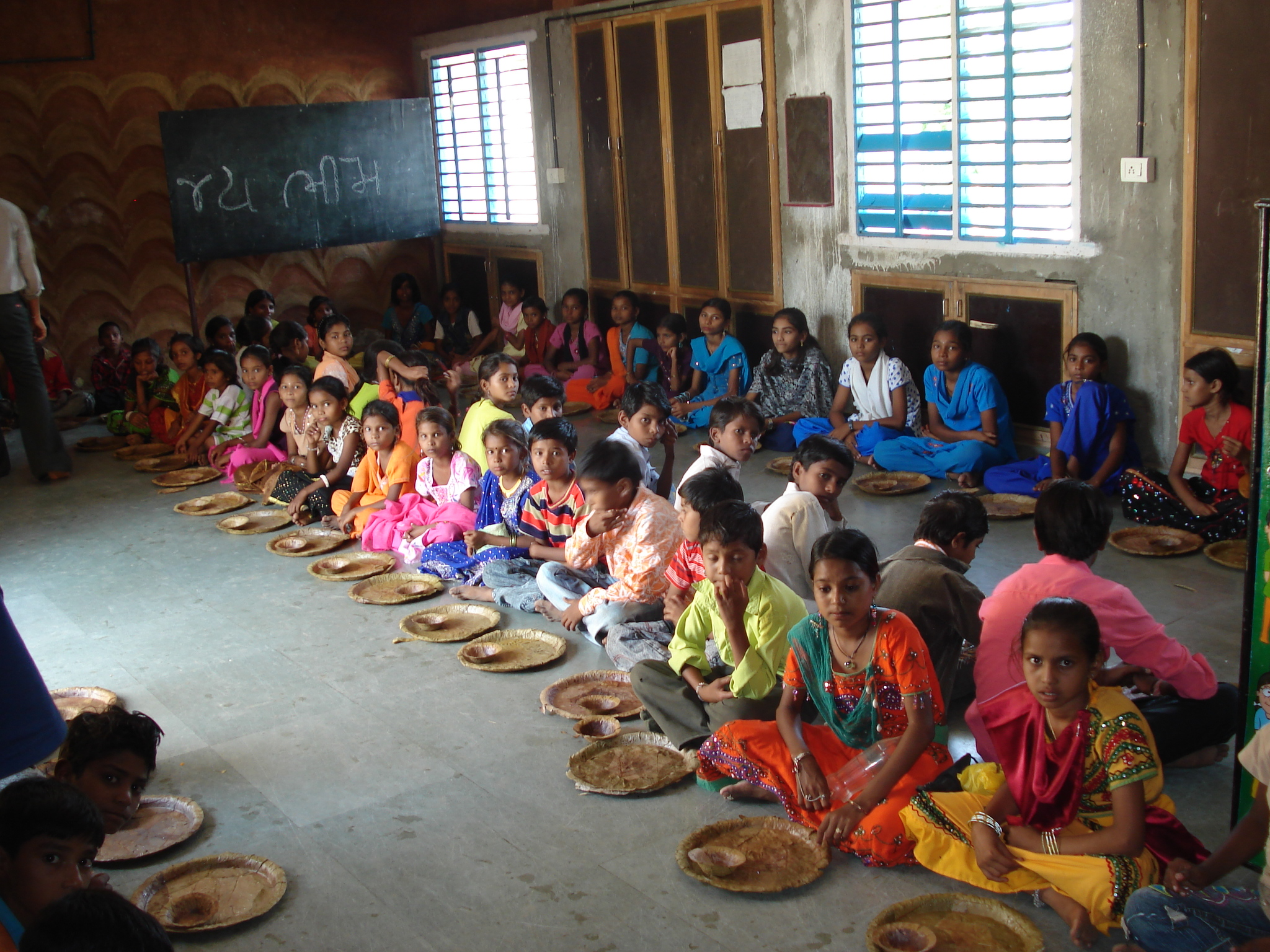
School lunch at Raika Primary School in Gujarat

The Midday Meal Scheme is a school meal programme of the Government of India designed to improve the nutritional status of school-age children nationwide, by supplying free lunches on working days for children in primary and upper primary classes in government, government aided, local body, Education Guarantee Scheme, and alternative innovative education centres, madrasa and maqtabs supported under Sarva Shiksha Abhiyan, and National Child Labour Project schools run by the ministry of labour. Serving 120,000,000 children in over 1,265,000 schools and Education Guarantee Scheme centres, it is one of the largest in the world.

With the twin objectives of improving health and education of the poor children, India has embarked upon an ambitious scheme of providing mid day meals (MDM) in the government and government-assisted primary schools. The administrative and logistical responsibilities of this scheme are enormous, and, therefore, offering food stamps or income transfer to targeted recipients is considered as an alternative.

In a welcome move, Government of India made special allocations for Midday Meal Scheme during nationwide lockdown and school closure period of COVID-19 to continue nutrition delivery to children. However, many experts have differing opinions on ground level implementation of MDM amid pandemic and its actual benefit delivered to school children.

==== Teacher Training ====
In addition, NUEPA (National University of Educational Planning and Administration) and NCTE (National Council for Teacher Education) are responsible for the management of the education system and teacher accreditation.

=== Types of schools ===
==== Government schools ====
The majority of Indian children attend government run schools. Education is free socially and economically for children until the age of 14. An Education Ministry data from 2017 showed that 65.2% (113 million) of all school students in 20 states attend government schools (c. 2017). These include schools runs by the state and local government as well as the central government. Example of large central government run school systems are Kendriya Vidyalaya in urban areas, Jawahar Navodaya Vidyalaya for the gifted students, Kasturba Gandhi Balika Vidyalaya for girls belonging to vulnerable SC/ST/OBC classes, and Indian Army Public Schools run by the Indian Army for the children of military personnel.

Kendriya Vidyalaya project, was started for the employees of the central government of India, who are deployed throughout the country. The government started the Kendriya Vidyalaya project in 1965 to provide uniform education in institutions following the same syllabus at the same pace regardless of the location to which the employee's family has been transferred.

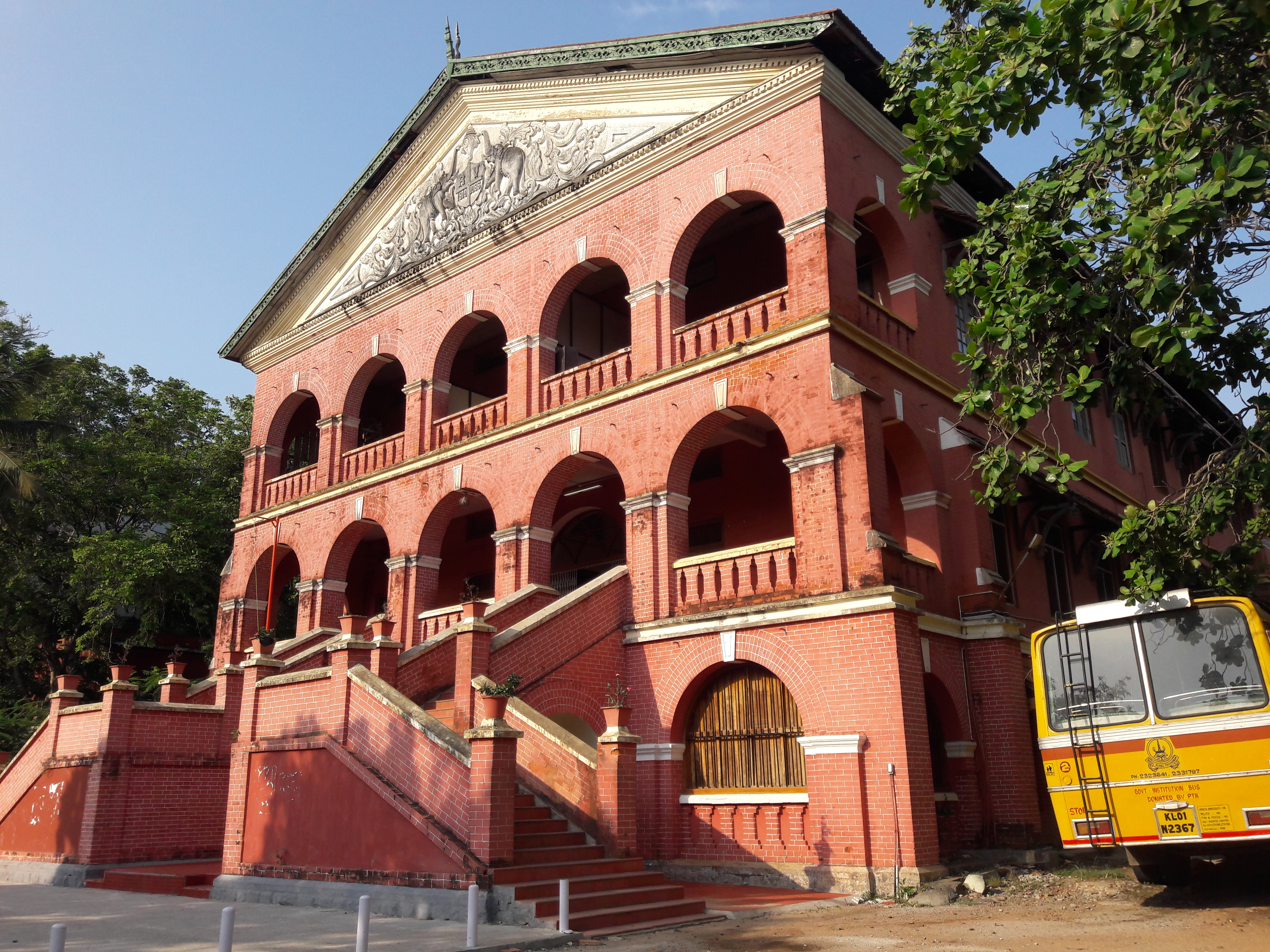
Government Model Higher Secondary School, Thiruvananthapuram, One of the oldest schools in Thiruvananthapuram run by the state government

==== Government aided private schools ====
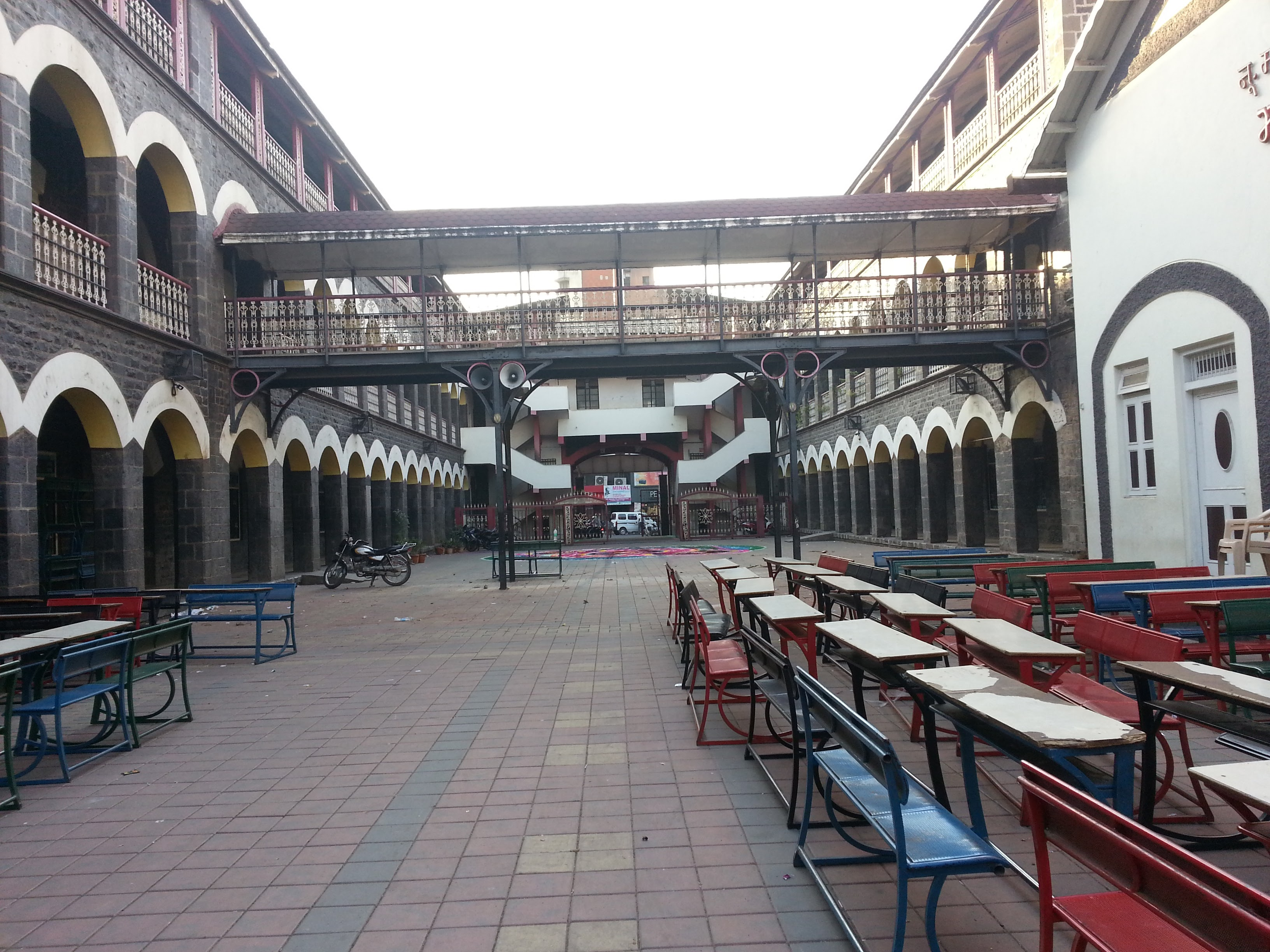
Nutan Marathi Vidyalaya, One of the oldest schools in Pune run by a government aided charitable trust

These are usually charitable trust run schools that receive partial funding from the government. The largest system of aided schools is run by D.A.V. College Managing Committee.

==== Private schools (unaided) ====
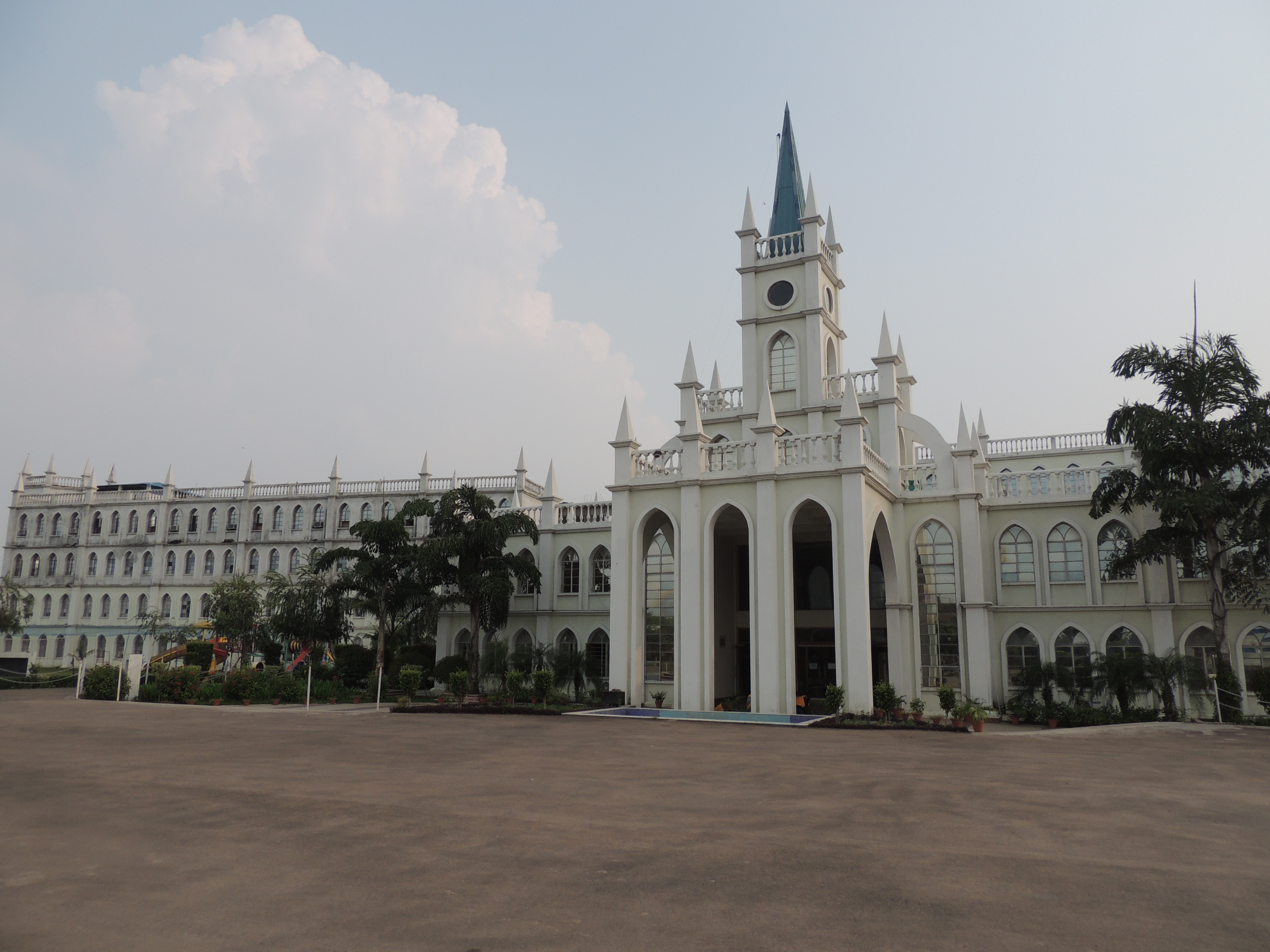
Delhi Public School, Azaad Nagar, Kanpur

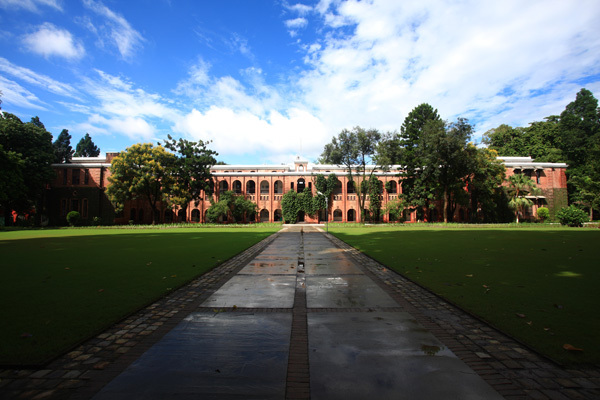
The Doon School

According to a survey an estimate, 29% of Indian children were privately educated in 2014. With more than 50% children enrolling in private schools in urban areas, the balance has already tilted towards private schooling in cities; and, even in rural areas, nearly 20% of the children in 2004-5 were enrolled in private schools.

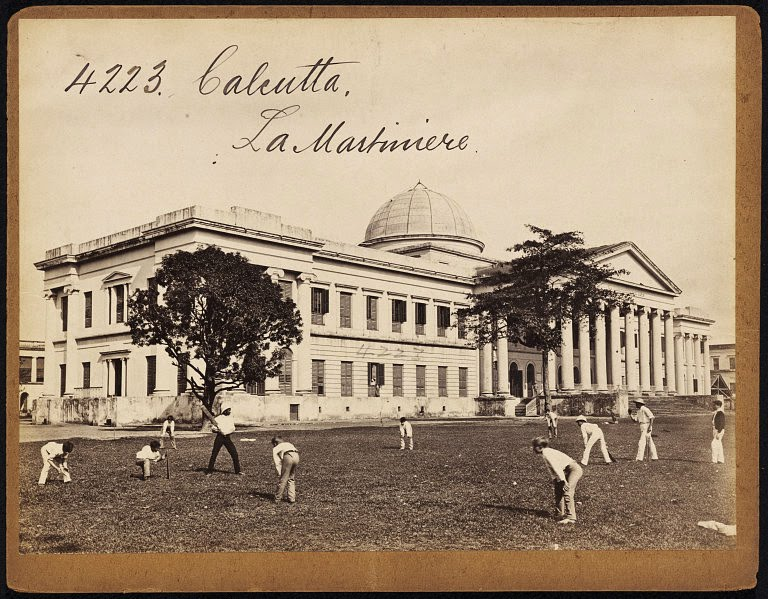
La Martiniere Calcutta, a private school in Kolkata

Most middle-class families send their children to private schools, mostly in their own city, but also at boarding schools. Private schools have been established since the British Rule in India and St George's School, Chennai is the oldest private school in India. At such schools, the medium of education is often English, but Hindi or the state's official language is also taught as a compulsory subject. Pre-school education is mostly limited to organised neighbourhood nursery schools with some organised chains. Montessori education is also popular, due to Maria Montessori's stay in India during World War II. In 2014, four of the top ten pre-schools in Chennai were Montessori.

Many privately owned and managed schools carry the appellation "Public", such as the Delhi Public Schools, or Frank Anthony Public Schools. These are modelled after British public schools, which are a group of older, expensive and exclusive fee-paying private independent schools in England.

Some studies claim private schools produce better academic results at lower costs per student compared to government schools, often due to different management practices and accountability structures. This is often attributed to factors such as better infrastructure, teacher accountability, and parental involvement. However, critics argue that private schools often exclude the poorest families, represent only a small portion of total schools, and have sometimes failed to comply with regulatory requirements. Research with children from the same family, in which one child attends private school and the other receives a government education, has found barely any difference in their attainment. Analysts suggest that the higher test scores in private schools largely reflect socioeconomic advantages, as these students often come from wealthier families. Such advantages often include access to educational resources, supportive home environments, and additional tutoring opportunities.

In their favour, it has been pointed out that private schools cover the entire curriculum and offer extra-curricular activities such as science fairs, general knowledge, sports, music and drama. The pupil teacher ratios are much better in private schools (1:31 whereas 1:37 for government schools) and more teachers in private schools are female. There is some disagreement over which system has better educated teachers. According to the latest DISE survey, the percentage of untrained teachers (para-teachers) is 54.91% in private, compared to 44.88% in government schools and only 2.32% teachers in unaided schools receive in-service training compared to 43.44% for government schools. The competition in the school market is intense, yet most schools make profit. However, the number of private schools in India is still low – the share of private institutions is 7% (with upper primary being 21% secondary 32% – source: fortress team research). Even the poorest often go to private schools despite the fact that government schools are free. A study found that 65% school-children in Hyderabad's slums attend private schools.

===== National schools =====
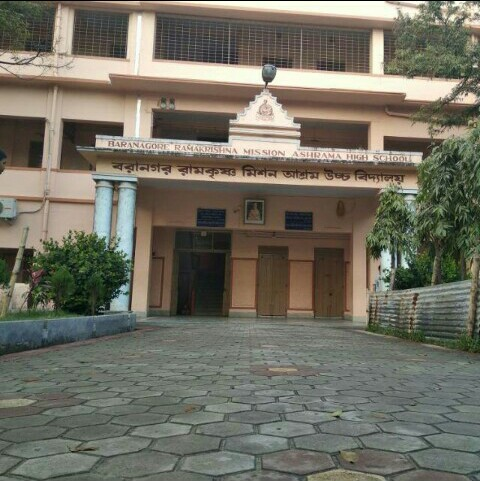
Baranagore Ramakrishna Mission Ashrama High School

- Atomic Energy Central School (established in 1969)
- Bal Bharati Public School (established in 1944)
- Bharatiya Vidya Bhavan (established in 1938)
- Chinmaya Vidyalaya (established in 1965)
- DAV Public School (established in 1886)
- Delhi Public School (established in 1949)
- Indian Army Public Schools (established in 1983)
- Jawahar Navodaya Vidyalaya (established in 1986)
- Kendriya Vidyalaya (established in 1963)
- Padma Seshadri Bala Bhavan (established in 1958)
- Railway Schools in India (established in 1873)
- Ramakrishna Mission Schools (established in 1922)
- Ryan International Schools (established in 1976)
- Sainik School (established in 1960)
- Saraswati Shishu Mandir (established in 1952)
- Seth M.R. Jaipuria Schools (established in 1992)
- Vivekananda Vidyalaya (established in 1972)
- Vivekananda Kendra Vidyalaya (established in 1977)
- Waldorf Schools (India) (established in 2002)

===== International schools =====
As of January 2015, the International Schools Consultancy (ISC) listed India as having 410 international schools. ISC defines an 'international school' in the following terms "ISC includes an international school if the school delivers a curriculum to any combination of pre-school, primary or secondary students, wholly or partly in English outside an English-speaking country, or if a school in a country where English is one of the official languages, offers an English-medium curriculum other than the country's national curriculum and is international in its orientation." This definition is used by publications including The Economist.

=== Home-schooling ===
Home-schooling in India is legal, though it is the less explored option, and often debated by educators. The Indian Government's stance on the issue is that parents are free to teach their children at home, if they wish to and have the means. The then MHRD Minister Kapil Sibal has stated that despite the RTE Act of 2009, if someone decides not to send his/her children to school, the government would not interfere.

=== Non-governmental work in education ===
NGO work in Indian education broadly spans four areas – piloting approaches to multigrade teaching, making improvements to learning environments, teacher training and support, and creating stronger school-community links.

NGO involvement in education has been crucial in delivering targeted action to under resourced communities, such as Scheduled Castes, Scheduled Tribes, the urban poor, children engaged in child labor, children with disabilities, etc. The Sarva Shiksha Abhiyan (SSA) recognised the role played by NGOs in ensuring access to education, particularly for students with disabilities. NGOs contributed to SSA by either leading advocacy movements for persons with disabilities or providing various types of assistance in rural settings for children with disabilities.

Under the SSA, NGOs also engaged in collaboration with the state to reach children excluded from mainstream education, including migrant children, child laborers, dropouts, children living in areas with civil instability and girls. There are 79,960 registered NGOs working in the areas of education and literacy. Partnerships under the SSA can occur through funding by Central and State governments, funding activities by identified National and State Resource Institutions or through participation in community activities of various Village Education Committees.

Grassroots education NGOs often deliver services via local governing institutions such as the Panchayati Raj and emphasise community participation in ensuring quality. The Mamidipudi Venkatarangaiya Foundation (MVF), established in 1991 to address literacy among child laborers utilised Parent Teacher Associations to disburse seed money for the programme under the supervision of the village Panchayat, which then took issues of staffing shortage and insufficient infrastructure to the State Government. The Pratham Educational Initiative in Delhi and Mumbai works with the Integrated Child Development Scheme to set up and provide support to community-run pre-school centres or balwadis. Under the Namma Shaale project in Karnataka, the Azim Premji Foundation identified seven key stakeholders (children, teachers, parents, School Development and Monitoring Committees, Community Based Organizations, Gram Panchayats, and education managers) in their work to establish a framework of school-community leadership.

NGOs also work with the State to enable teacher training. There have been a number of NGO partnerships with local District Institute of Educational Training. The Rishi Valley Institute for Educational Resources (RIVER) has worked with school districts in many Indian states to provide multi-grade, multi-level training approaches catering to the needs of remote one-room schools. The Eklavya Foundation in Madhya Pradesh has been working with the State Council for Education Research and Training since 1987 to train teachers in making learning a joyful experience by emphasising skill development and practical learning in the sciences.

NGOs have historically been associated with non-formal education (NFE) programmes, both in providing alternative pedagogical approaches as well as substitutes to mainstream education. The Bharat Gyan Vigyan Samiti, for instance, emphasises "science and literacy for national integration and self-reliance" and uses approaches such as the Gyan Vigyan Vidyalayas to encourage long-term engagement in literacy.

Studies in NGO involvement in education have criticised the adoption of NGO models into formal schooling as low-cost options that require institutional mechanisms to avoid undermining the State's financial responsibility in providing elementary education. The cost‐effectiveness of NGO programmes has yet to be determined. In studies that demonstrate that NGOs are more cost-effective in the Global South, there have been concerns raised that this is accomplished by cutting ethical corners, such as underpayment of NGO workers.

== Open and distance learning in India ==
Open schooling refers to a system of education that allows individuals to pursue their education through flexible and extensible learning methods. It is primarily targeted towards students who are unable to attend regular schools due to various reasons, such as work commitments, financial constraints, or other personal circumstances. The National Institute of Open Schooling (NIOS) is the largest open schooling system in India, operating under the aegis of the Indian Ministry of Education. NIOS offers various academic and vocational courses at the secondary (10th grade) and senior secondary (12th grade) levels. It follows a learner-centric approach and provides education through open and distance learning methods.

Apart from NIOS, some states like Kerala have their own open schooling boards that provide similar opportunities for flexible learning and certification. The certificates and qualifications offered by NIOS or state open education boards are recognised by various educational institutions, colleges, and universities in India and abroad, and hold the same value as certificates obtained through regular schooling. 1.4 million students are enrolled at the secondary and higher secondary level through open and distance learning.

At the school level, the Board of Open Schooling and Skill Education, Sikkim (BOSSE), NIOS provides opportunities for continuing education to those who missed completing school education. In 2012, various state governments also introduced the State Open School program to provide distance education.

Massive open online courses are made available for free by the MHRD and various educational institutes.

=== Online education ===
Online education in India has evolved into a highly regularized, mainstream multi-billion-dollar academic ecosystem. Spurred initially by the implementation of the National Education Policy (NEP) 2020, the 'Bharat Padhe Online' program launched by the MHRD (now Ministry of Education) and prolonged institutional lockdowns during the COVID-19 pandemic in India, the sector fundamentally transitioned from emergency remote lecturing into a structured marketplace. By 2025, the Indian online education market had reached an estimated valuation of US$3.64 billion, with projections indicating steady growth to over US$7.40 billion by the end of 2026. This growth has been heavily underpinned by rising internet penetration through national broadband initiatives like BharatNet and a growing cultural acceptance of digital micro-credentials and executive upskilling programs.

==== Regulatory framework and academic validity ====
The modern structural baseline for e-learning was established on 4 July 2018 through the UGC (Online Courses or Programmes) Regulations, 2018(later Amendments in 2020: The University Grants Commission relaxed eligibility criteria to let more institutions provide online education to improve the Gross Enrollment Ratio), which empowered the Distance Education Bureau (DEB) to certify digital higher education. Following judicial backing from the Supreme Court of India confirming that certified online degrees possess legal parity with on-campus programs, institutional adoption escalated significantly. By 2026, the number of UGC-DEB approved universities entitled to offer full-fledged online degrees reached 113—representing a 168% increase from the 53 universities registered in 2020—collectively hosting over 1,200 undergraduate and postgraduate digital programs.

To further bridge traditional and digital academia, the UGC introduced a credit framework allowing regular degree-pursuing students to complete up to 40% of their total semester courses via the online SWAYAM platform. In 2026, the UGC instituted rigorous compliance parameters to secure student data and streamline credits. It integrated the Distance Education Bureau ID (DEB-ID) with the APAAR (Automated Permanent Academic Account Registry) framework, a unique 12-digit student identification number linked to the Academic Bank of Credits (ABC). By mid-2026, over 26.35 crore verified APAAR IDs had been generated across India, allowing seamless inter-university credit transfers. Concurrently, under the National Commission for Allied and Healthcare Professions (NCAHP) Act, the UGC enforced strict containment guidelines, officially prohibiting all clinical healthcare, allied medical sciences, and psychology programs from being delivered via fully online or open and distance learning (ODL) formats due to missing practical training components.

==== Digital public infrastructure and free learning ====
To offset the steep economic barriers associated with commercial entrance coaching and to standardize digital education across states, the Ministry of Education (India) systematically expanded state-backed educational architecture:

- Launched to unify digital, online, and on-air education, the PM e-VIDYA framework provides multi-mode access to millions of students. A core component is DIKSHA (Digital Infrastructure for Knowledge Sharing), which serves as a national repository for e-books and e-content created by states and UTs, featuring QR-coded access directly linked to physical NCERT textbooks.
- National Digital Education Architecture (NDEAR): Functioning as an architectural blueprint rather than a single software application, NDEAR was established to ensure that digital educational technology across the country remains federated, interoperable, and inclusive, adhering to a "digital first" approach for both administration and classroom teaching.
- SATHEE Portal: Collaboratively developed by the Ministry of Education (India) and IIT Kanpur, the Self-Assessment, Test and Help for Entrance Exams (SATHEE) platform provides free, AI-driven adaptive learning assessments. Supported by lectures curated by faculty from the IITs, IISc, and AIIMS, it offers structured instruction for highly competitive examinations including the JEE, NEET, and CUET. Materials are delivered in English, Hindi, and 12 regional languages.
- SWAYAM Platform: Operating under the "One Nation, One Digital Platform" framework, India's indigenous MOOC system, SWAYAM, has become a global digital learning pillar. As of 2026, the platform surpassed 5.80 crore student enrollments and offers over 4,400 unique courses developed by national coordinators like NPTEL, NCERT, and the UGC.
- SWAYAM Prabha: To bridge the digital divide for students in remote areas without high-speed internet, the government expanded SWAYAM Prabha—a group of 48 dedicated DTH Satellite television channels broadcasting 24/7 localized academic lectures and SATHEE test preparation materials.

==== Private sector maturity, specialized utilities, and hybrid models ====
The private EdTech sector in India experienced extreme volatility following the pandemic boom. Venture-backed entities that relied on aggressive, high-cost student acquisition strategies faced massive financial downturns, restructuring, and in prominent cases like Byju's, insolvency proceedings. Additionally, to combat predatory marketing practices, the Advertising Standards Council of India (ASCI) rolled out strict guidelines prohibiting EdTech platforms from airing misleading advertisements, promoting unhealthy study schedules, or stereotyping low-scoring students as failures.

Consequently, the non-governmental market diversified heavily into mass-volume educators and specialized utility platforms operating at highly reduced price ceilings:

Mass-Volume Hybrid Educators: Entities like Physics Wallah (PW) and Khan GS Research Centre disrupted the traditional coaching market by optimizing direct-to-student streaming networks, offering core engineering, medical, and civil service prep suites at nominal prices. By 2026, major players in this segment shifted toward an "omnichannel" model, establishing physical-digital hybrid learning centers (such as PW's Vidyapeeth) in Tier-II and Tier-III municipalities. Regional titans like Utkarsh Classes similarly scaled massive digital subscriber bases by focusing on vernacular languages and state-level competitive exams.

- Affordable Assessment and Utility Platforms: A significant tier of the market shifted away from full-suite video lecturing toward affordable testing and practice. Companies like Testbook and Adda247 captured massive user bases by offering high-volume mock tests and micro-courses for government recruitment exams at fraction-of-a-cent margins.
- Targeted Study Frameworks: The ecosystem also spawned highly specialized utility applications. Platforms such as the MARKS App provide targeted, data-driven test preparation and extensive question banks for elite entrance exams. Simultaneously, digital resource repositories like Selfstudys grew exponentially by democratizing access to study materials, offering comprehensive PDFs, NCERT solutions, and mock papers, thereby neutralizing the financial barriers associated with expensive physical reference books.

== Deaf education in India ==
=== History of education in India for the DHH population ===
India is very diverse with eight main religions, hundreds of ethnic groups, and 21 languages with hundreds of dialects. This diversity has made it difficult to educate deaf or hard of hearing (DHH) people in India for generations.

There is a history of educating the deaf in India, however, there is no single clear approach to their education. This stems from conditions, some similar to those faced around the world, and others unique to India. For example, prior to independence of India, there were not clear laws and protections for the disabled. Since independence, advancements have been made for rights of the disabled, but this has not fully tackled the issue.

Pre-independence there were only 24 schools for the deaf in India, and all of these used an oral approach. The belief was that using sign language would hinder advancements of hearing and speaking in deaf children. Additionally, there was no single Indian sign language, so signs would differ depending on where the school was located.

Post-independence, there are more services and resources available for DHH people, however, challenges with education remain. There are organisations around the country that work to advance the spread and quality of education for the deaf.

=== Education for DHH children ===
Oralism and the use of sign language are two competing approaches to education for DHH people. While oralism dominates in India, which is an approach that encourages speaking and hearing, it is usually not realistic for DHH children.

There is an Indian Sign Language, however, it is not formally recognised by the government and it is not complete or comprehensive. It varies around the country and is not encouraged by professionals and educators. Beliefs of the past that the use of sign language will hinder the potential advancements of hearing and speaking in DHH children remain. In recent years, there has been a notion to encourage the use of sign language in India and teach it in schools. In 2017, the first ISL dictionary was released.

Due to these challenges and beliefs associated with sign language, education for DHH people in India often focuses on teaching children to hear, speak, and read lips, this is known as an oral approach.

In India there are regular schools and special schools. Special schools provide education for children with different disabilities. Special schools can be beneficial to DHH children, and provide a better education than they would receive in a regular school. However, these schools are not available for every deaf child. Sometimes they are located too far from a child's home. Another reason a child may have to attend a regular school is if they receive hearing technology. Since India focuses on hearing and speaking for the deaf, hearing technology is encouraged. Once a child receives hearing technology it is believed that they can attend regular schools. Even with hearing technology, DHH children still need special education in order to succeed. This puts them at a significant disadvantage in regular school and can cause them to fall behind academically, linguistically, and developmentally. For these reasons, many deaf children receive poor education or no education at all, causing the illiteracy rate of deaf children to rise.

Education in India in regular schools and deaf schools has problems. Even in deaf schools, sign language is not usually taught and used. Some use a small amount of sign language but all of the deaf schools in India use or claim to use an oral approach. Some deaf schools secretly teach sign language due to the stigma and beliefs surrounding the use of sign language, and disability in general, in India. Children in deaf schools have to try to learn by hearing or reading lips and writing. In hearing schools, the children have to do the same. There are no special accommodations. Additionally, there are not any teachers that use sign language in regular schools (maybe a few in deaf schools), and there aren't any interpreters.

There are a couple of hundred deaf schools in India and vocational training is becoming more common for DHH people.

=== Higher education ===
There are no deaf colleges or universities in India. A person's education ends with grade school- where they likely were not able to learn. With lack of education, DHH people then have a very difficult time finding a job.

There is one interpreter in one college in India, Delhi University.

== Quality ==
=== Literacy ===
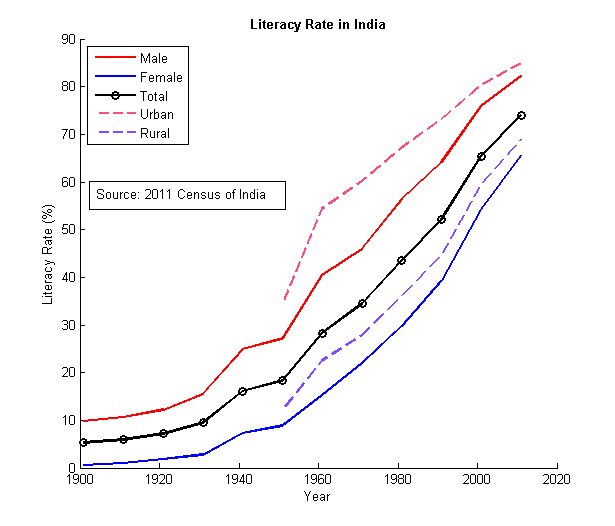
Literacy in India grew very slowly until independence in 1947. An acceleration in the rate of literacy growth occurred in the 1991–2001 period.

According to the Census of 2011, "every person above the age of 7 years who can read and write with understanding in any language is said to be literate". According to this criterion, the 2011 survey holds the national literacy rate to be 74.04%. The youth literacy rate, measured within the age group of 15 to 24, is 81.1% (84.4% among males and 74.4% among females), while 86% of boys and 72% of girls are literate in the 10–19 age group.

Within the Indian states, Kerala has the highest literacy rate of 93.91% whereas Bihar averaged 61.8% literacy. The 2001 statistics indicated that the total number of 'absolute non-literates' in the country was 304 million. Gender gap in literacy rate is high, for example in Rajasthan, the state with the lowest female literacy rate in India, average female literacy rate is 52.66% and average male literacy rate is 80.51%, making a gender gap of 27.85%.

=== Attainment ===
As of 2011, enrolment rates are 58% for pre-primary, 93% for primary, 69% for secondary, and 25% for tertiary education.

Despite the high overall enrolment rate for primary education among rural children of age 10, half of them could not read at a basic level, over 60% were unable to do division, and half dropped out by the age of 14.

In 2009, two states in India, Tamil Nadu and Himachal Pradesh, participated in the international PISA exams which is administered once every three years to 15-year-old's. Both states ranked at the bottom of the table, beating out only Kyrgyzstan in score, and falling 200 points (two standard deviations) below the average for OECD countries. While in the immediate aftermath there was a short-lived controversy over the quality of primary education in India, ultimately India decided to not participate in PISA for 2012, and again not to for 2015 and 2018.

While the quality of free, public education is in crisis, a majority of the urban poor have turned to private schools. In some urban cities, it is estimated as high as two-thirds of all students attend private institutions, many of which charge a modest US$2 per month.

==== Public school workforce ====
Officially, the pupil to teacher ratio within the public school system for primary education is 35:1. However, teacher absenteeism in India is exorbitant, with 25% never showing up for work. The World Bank estimates the cost in salaries alone paid to no-show teachers who have never attended work is US$2 billion per year.

A study on teachers by Kremer etc. found out that 25% of private sector teachers and 40% of public sector medical workers were absent during the survey. Among teachers who were paid to teach, absence rates ranged from 14.6% in Maharashtra to 41.9% in Jharkhand. Only 1 in nearly 3,000 public school head teachers had ever dismissed a teacher for repeated absence. The same study found "only about half were teaching, during unannounced visits to a nationally representative sample of government primary schools in India."

=== Higher education ===
As per "Report of the Higher education in India, Issues Related to Expansion, Inclusiveness, Quality and Finance", the access to higher education measured in term of gross enrolment ratio increased from 0.7% in 1950/51 to 1.4% in 1960–61. By 2006/7 the GER increased to about 11%. Notably, by 2012, it had crossed 20% (as mentioned in an earlier section).

According to a survey by All India Survey on Higher Education (AISHE) released by the ministry of human resource development, Tamil Nadu which has the highest gross enrolment ratio (GER) in higher education in the country has registered an increase of 2.6% to take GER to 46.9 per cent in 2016–17.

=== Vocational education ===
An optimistic estimate from 2008 was that only one in five job-seekers in India ever had any sort of vocational training. However, it is expected to grow as the CBSE has brought changes in its education system which emphasises inclusion of certain number and types of vocational subjects in classes 9th and 11th. Although it is not mandatory for schools to go for it but a good number of schools have voluntarily accepted the suggestion and incorporated the change in their curriculum.

== Challenges ==
=== Child labour ===
Child labour was officially outlawed in 1986. As of 2023, 1% of children aged 5–14 (around 2.1 million) were subjected to child labour.

=== Facilities ===
As per the 2016 Annual Survey of Education Report (ASER), 3.5% schools in India had no toilet facility while only 68.7% schools had usable toilet facility. 75.5% of the schools surveyed had a library in 2016, a decrease from 78.1% in 2014. The percentage of schools with separate girls toilet have increased from 32.9% in 2010 to 61.9%in 2016. 74.1% of schools had drinking water facility and 64.5% of the schools had a playground.

=== Curriculum issues ===
Modern education in India is often criticised for being based on rote learning rather than problem solving. Anil K. Rajvanshi writes that the Indian education system seems to be producing zombies since in most of the schools students seemed to be spending majority of their time in preparing for competitive exams rather than learning or playing. Preschool for Child Rights states that almost 99% of pre-schools do not have any curriculum at all. Also, creativity is not encouraged and is considered a form of entertainment in most institutions. The 2009 Hindi movie 3 Idiots specifically highlighted these issues, which led to major debates, especially in higher education.

The British "essentialist" view of knowledge of the nineteenth century emphasised the individual, scientific, universal, and moral aims of education ahead of the social and cultural. This, combined with the colonial construction of Indian society, designed to preserve the ideological lead of the Empire post-1857, it helped shape the official nineteenth-century school curriculum. The rejection of nationalist Gopal Krishna Gokhale's Bill (1911) to make primary education free and compulsory by the colonial administration and English-educated and often upper-caste elite further helped sustain a curriculum that focused on colonial objectives. Holmes and McLean (1989, 151) argue that despite tensions between the colonial view of education and the nationalist postcolonial aims of education, British essentialism grew unassailable roots in India partly because "colonial values coincided with those of indigenous traditions."

Since India's independence, the composition of school curricula, particularly national NCERT history textbooks, has been a subject of ongoing debate among educational authorities and scholars. Proponents of curriculum reform, including initiatives under the National Education Policy (NEP) 2020, argue that historic syllabi disproportionately prioritized Delhi-centric imperial dynasties, such as the Delhi Sultanate and Mughal Empire, while underrepresenting regional powers including the Ahoms of Assam, the Maratha Empire, the Chola and Vijayanagara dynasties of South India, and northern indigenous traditions. Advocates maintain that recent textbook revisions seek to decolonize national history and offer a more inclusive representation of India's diverse regional heritage.Policies drafted such as National Education Policy (NEP) 2020 that have broad reach also involving higher education, are also criticized for not advocating for equitable and just educational foundation rather to a privileged few. For example, the draft curriculum for undergraduate mathematics released by UGC as part of NEP, contained Kala Ganpana (traditional Indian time calculation), Bharatiya Bijganit (Indian algebra), Shulba Sutra (maxims of fire-altar measurements), among others while providing limited coverage of core subjects and applied math, as well as poorly designed elective courses. Indian-origin Field medalist, Manjul Bhargava claimed that "We must own ours (Indian contribution to mathematics) and be proud of them. It acts as an inspiration to the current generation” while critics questioned the meaningful impact of these subjects to an Indian mathematician's career while noting a general trend of nationalist and revivalist agendas overshadowing historical accuracy and academic rigor.

=== Rural education ===
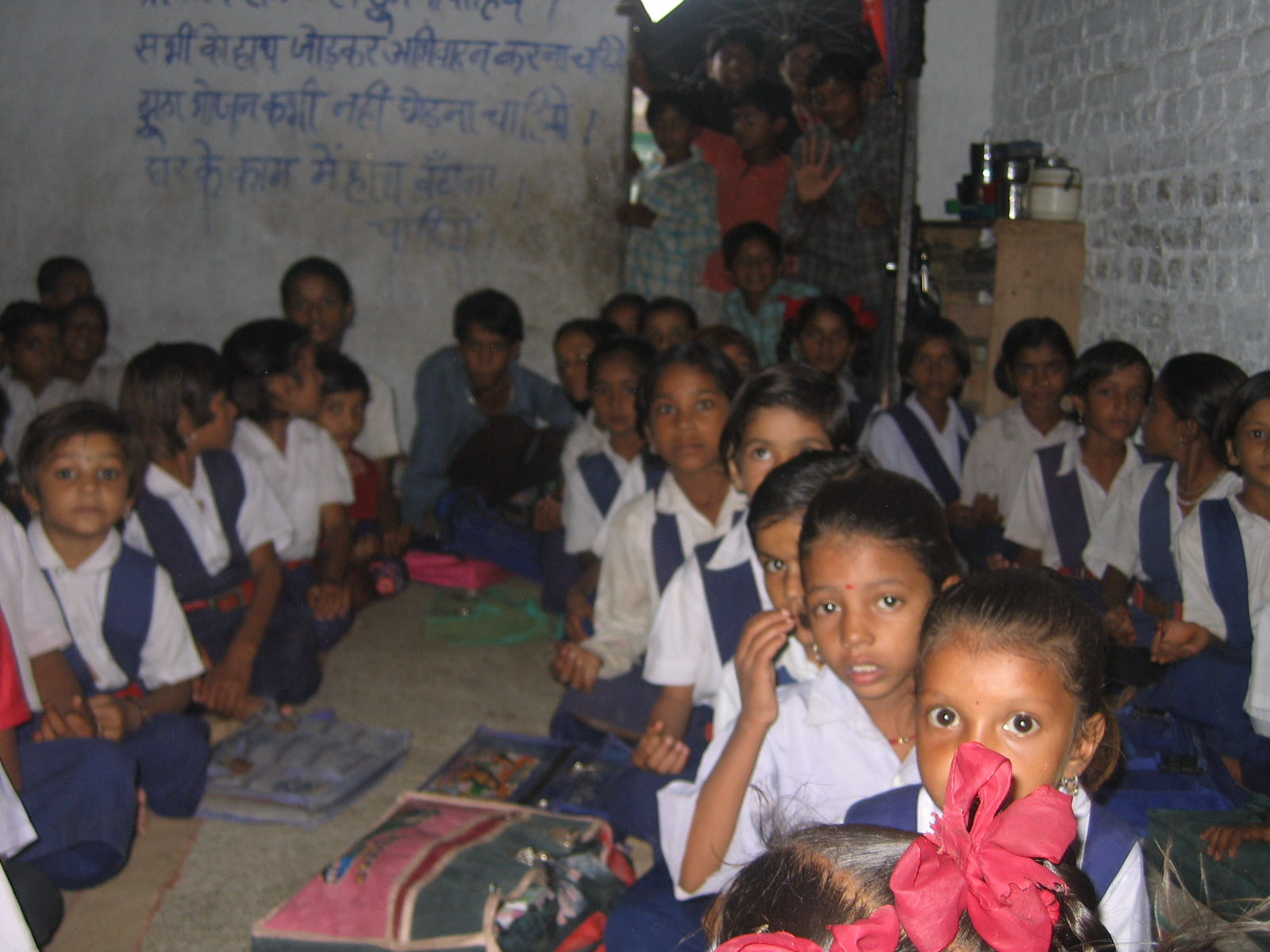
A primary school in a village in Madhya Pradesh

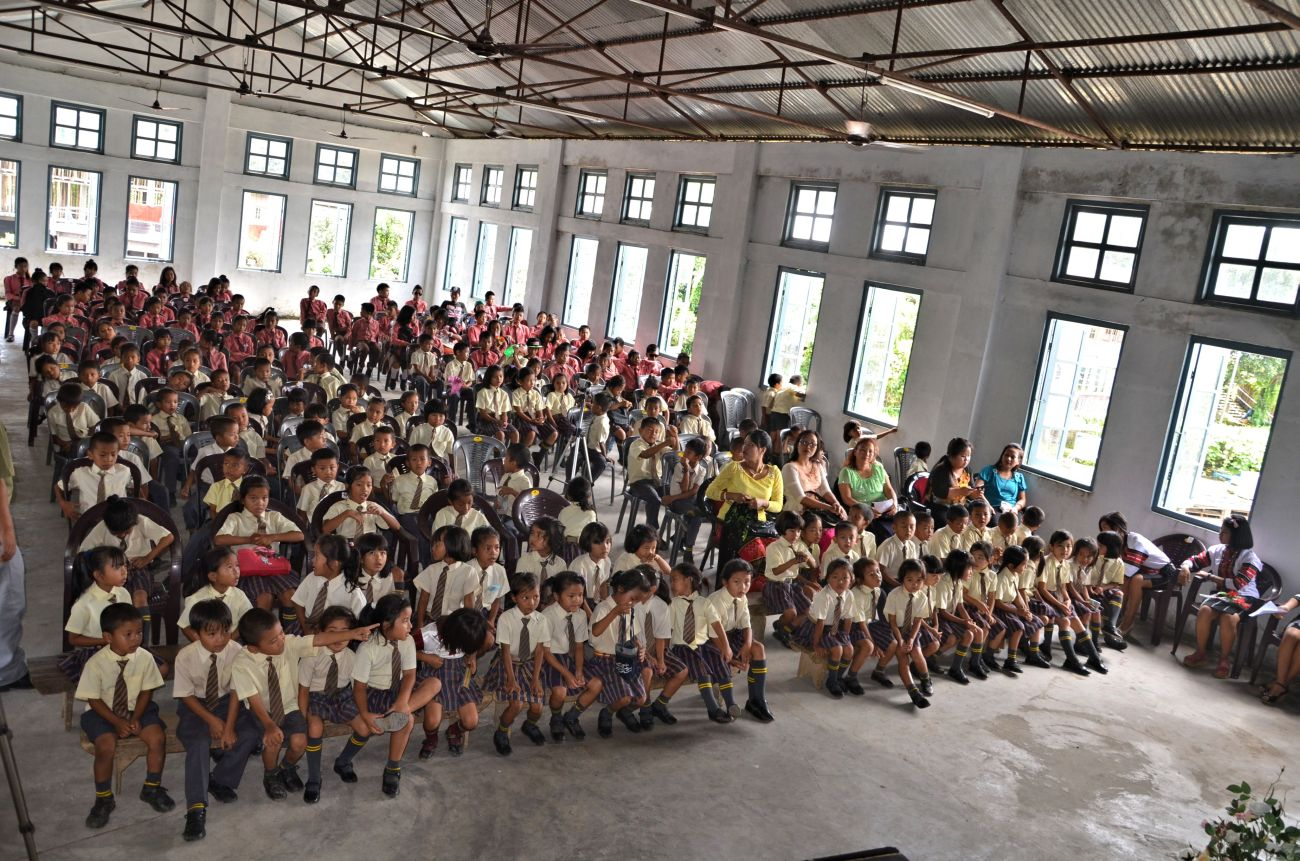
Indian school children in Mizoram

Following independence, India viewed education as an effective tool for bringing social change through community development. The administrative control was effectively initiated in the 1950s, when, in 1952, the government grouped villages under a Community Development Block—an authority under a national programme which could control education in up to 100 villages. A Block Development Officer oversaw a geographical area of 150 square miles (390 km^{2}) which could contain a population of as many as 70,000 people.

Setty and Ross elaborate on the role of such programmes, themselves divided further into individual-based, community based, or the Individual-cum-community-based, in which microscopic levels of development are overseen at village level by an appointed worker:

The community development programmes comprise agriculture, animal husbandry, cooperation, rural industries, rural engineering (consisting of minor irrigation, roads, buildings), health and sanitation including family welfare, family planning, women welfare, child care and nutrition, education including adult education, social education and literacy, youth welfare and community organisation. In each of these areas of development there are several programmes, schemes and activities which are additive, expanding and tapering off covering the total community, some segments, or specific target populations such as small and marginal farmers, artisans, women and in general people below the poverty line.

Despite some setbacks the rural education programmes continued throughout the 1950s, with support from private institutions. A sizeable network of rural education had been established by the time the Gandhigram Rural Institute was established and 5,200 Community Development Blocks were established in India. Nursery schools, elementary schools, secondary school, and schools for adult education for women were set up.

The government continued to view rural education as an agenda that could be relatively free from bureaucratic backlog and general stagnation. However, in some cases lack of financing balanced the gains made by rural education institutes of India. Some ideas failed to find acceptability among India's poor and investments made by the government sometimes yielded little results. Today, government rural schools remain poorly funded and understaffed. Several foundations, such as the Rural Development Foundation (Hyderabad), actively build high-quality rural schools, but the number of students served is small.

Education in rural India is valued differently from in an urban setting, with lower rates of completion. An imbalanced sex ratio exists within schools with 18% of males earning a high school diploma compared with only 10% of females. The estimated number of children who have never attended school in India is near 100 million which reflects the low completion levels. This is the largest concentration in the world of youth who have not enrolled in school.

=== Women's education ===
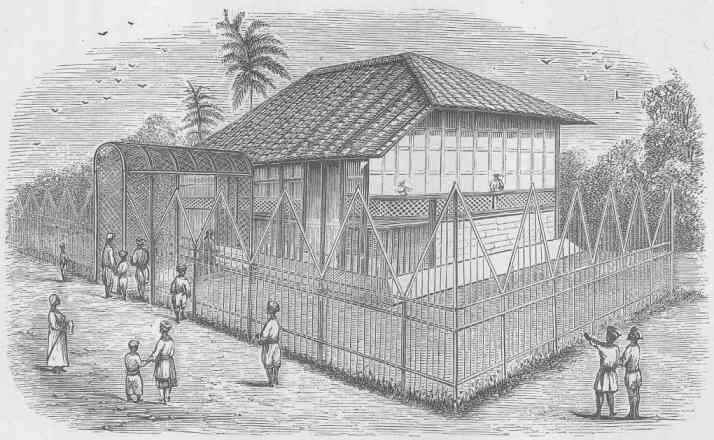
London Mission Bengali Girls' School, Calcutta (LMS, 1869, p.12)

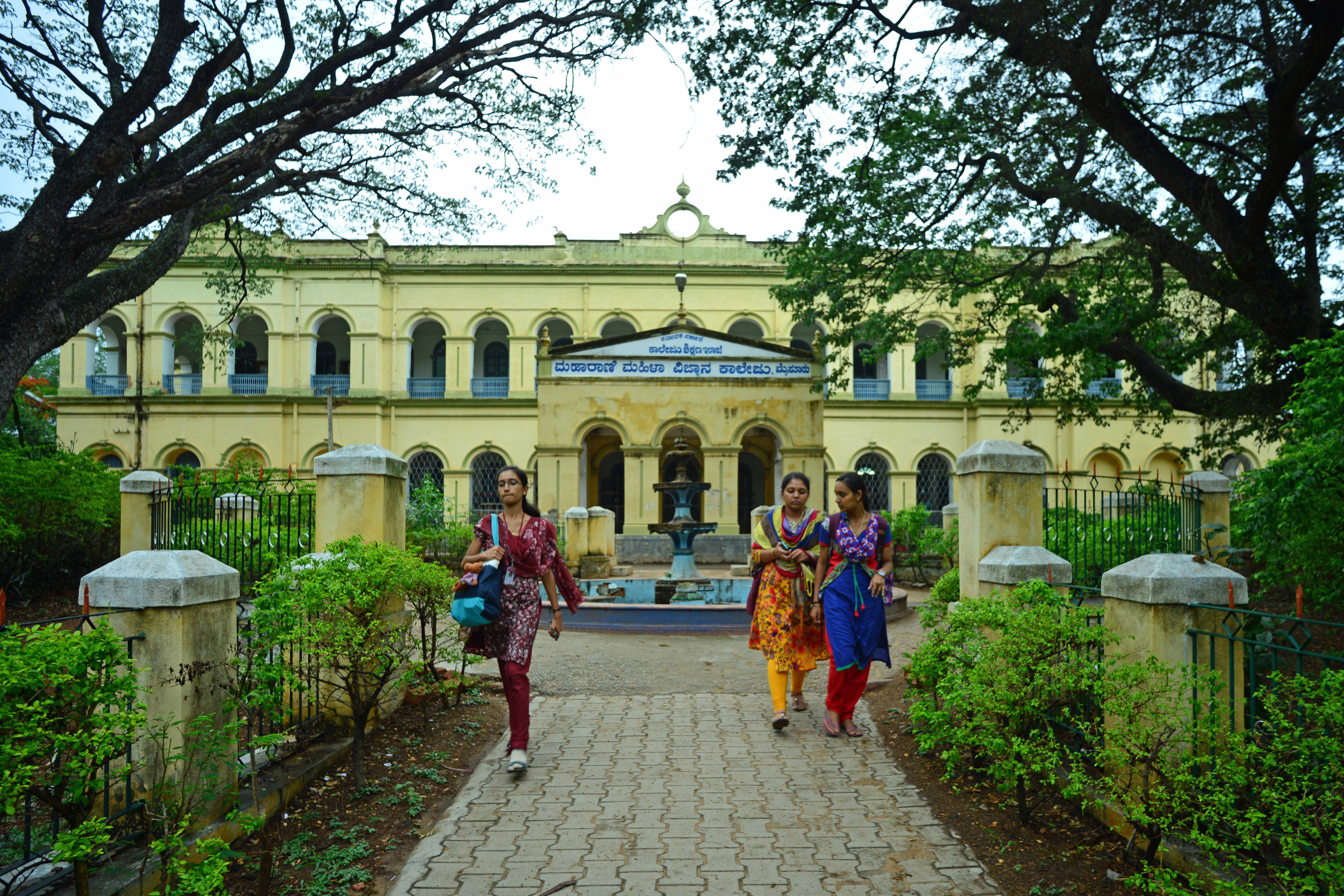
Maharanis College for Women, Mysore

Women have a much lower literacy rate than men. Far fewer girls are enrolled in the schools, and many of them drop out. In the patriarchal setting of the Indian family, girls have lower status and fewer privileges than boys. Conservative cultural attitudes prevent some girls from attending school. Furthermore, educated women belonging to the upper middle classes are less likely to enter the workforce compared to uneducated women of lower classes. They opt to stay at home due to traditional, cultural and religious norms.

The number of literate women among the female population of India was between 2–6% from the British Raj onward to the formation of the Republic of India in 1947. Concerted efforts led to improvement from 15.3% in 1961 to 28.5% in 1981. By 2001 literacy for women had exceeded 50% of the overall female population, though these statistics were still very low compared to world standards and even male literacy within India. Recently the Indian government has launched Saakshar Bharat Mission for Female Literacy. This mission aims to bring down female illiteracy by half of its present level.

Sita Anantha Raman outlines the progress of women's education in India:

Since 1947 the Indian government has tried to provide incentives for girls' school attendance through programmes for midday meals, free books, and uniforms. This welfare thrust raised primary enrollment between 1951 and 1981. In 1986 the National Policy on Education decided to restructure education in tune with the social framework of each state, and with larger national goals. It emphasised that education was necessary for democracy, and central to the improvement of women's condition. The new policy aimed at social change through revised texts, curricula, increased funding for schools, expansion in the numbers of schools, and policy improvements. Emphasis was placed on expanding girls' occupational centres and primary education; secondary and higher education; and rural and urban institutions. The report tried to connect problems like low school attendance with poverty, and the dependence on girls for housework and sibling day care. The National Literacy Mission also worked through female tutors in villages. Although the minimum marriage age is now eighteen for girls, many continue to be married much earlier. Therefore, at the secondary level, female drop-out rates are high.

Sita Anantha Raman also mentions that while the educated Indian women workforce maintains professionalism, the men outnumber them in most fields and, in some cases, receive higher income for the same positions.

The education of women in India plays a significant role in improving livings standards in the country. A higher female literacy rate improves the quality of life both at home and outside the home, by encouraging and promoting education of children, especially female children, and in reducing the infant mortality rate. Several studies have shown that a lower level of women literacy rates results in higher levels of fertility and infant mortality, poorer nutrition, lower earning potential and the lack of an ability to make decisions within a household. Women's lower educational levels is also shown to adversely affect the health and living conditions of children. A survey that was conducted in India showed results which support the fact that infant mortality rate was inversely related to female literacy rate and educational level. The survey also suggests a correlation between education and economic growth.

In India, there is a large disparity between female literacy rates in different states. The state of Kerala has the highest female literacy rate of 91.98% while Rajasthan has the lowest female literacy rate of 52.66. This correlates to the health levels of states, Kerala has average life expectancy at birth of 74.9 while Rajasthan's average life expectancy at birth is 67.7 years.

In India, higher education is defined as the education of an age group between 18 and 24, and is largely funded by the government. Despite women making up 24–50% of higher education enrolment, there is still a gender imbalance within higher education. Only one third of science students and 7% of engineering students, are women. In comparison, however, over half the students studying Education are women.

=== Accreditation ===
In 2018, 277 fake engineering colleges were identified. In January 2010, the Government of India decided to withdraw Deemed university status from as many as 44 institutions. The Government claimed in its affidavit that academic considerations were not being kept in mind by the management of these institutions and that "they were being run as family fiefdoms". In February 2009, the University Grant Commission found 39 fake institutions operating in India.

=== Employer training ===
Only 16% of manufacturers in India offer in-service training to their employees, compared with over 90% in China.

=== Teacher careers ===
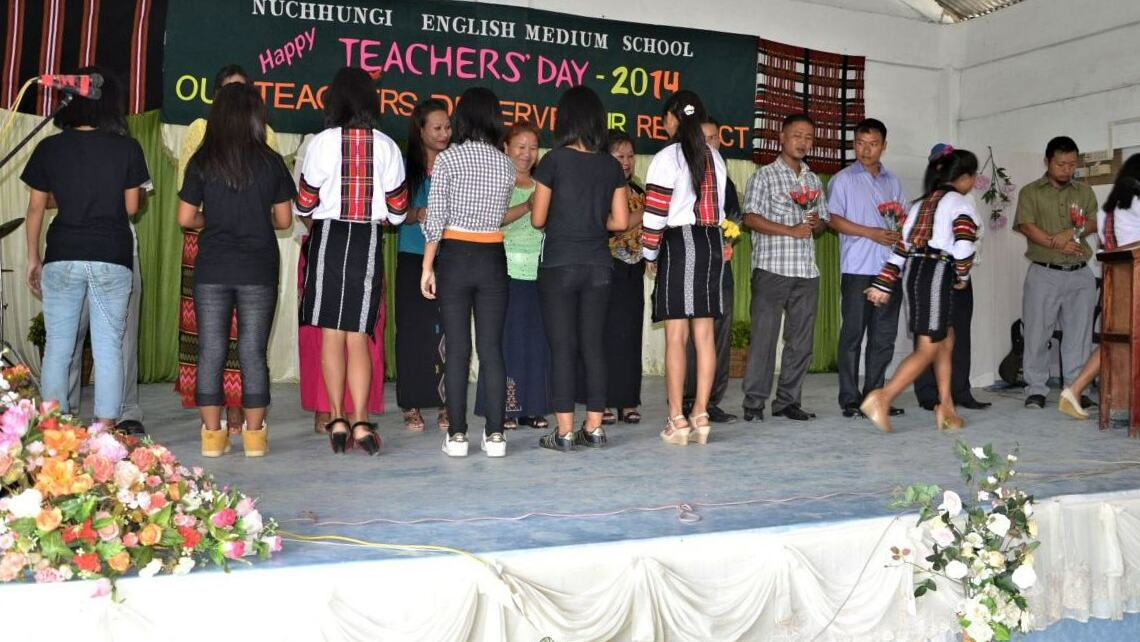
Nuchhungi English Medium School Hnahthial Lunglei Mizoram on Teachers' Day

In the Indian education system, a teacher's success is loosely defined. It is either based on a student's success or based on the years of teaching experience, both of which do not necessarily correlate to a teacher's skill set or competencies. The management of an institution could thereby be forced to promote teachers based on the grade level they teach or their seniority, both of which are often not an indicator of a good teacher. This means that either a primary school teacher is promoted to a higher grade, or a teacher is promoted to take up other roles within the institution such as Head of department, coordinator, Vice Principal or Principal. However, the skills and competencies that are required for each of them vary and a great teacher may not be a great manager. Since teachers do not see their own growth and success in their own hands, they often do not take up any professional development. Thus, there is a need to identify a framework to help a teacher chart a career path based on his/her own competency and help them understand their own development.

=== Coaching Institutes ===
Increased competition to get admission in reputed colleges has given rise to this toxic private coaching institutes in India. They prepare students for engineering, medical, MBA, banking jobs' entrance tests as well as American SAT and GRE. There are also coaching institutes that teach subjects like English for employment in India and abroad.

Private coaching institutes are of two types: offline coaching and online coaching. There are many online coaching centres and apps available in the market and their usage is growing, especially in tier 2 metro cities.

A 2013 survey by ASSOCHAM predicted the size of private coaching industry to grow to $40 billion, or Rs 2.39 trillion (short scale) by 2015.

Kota in Rajasthan is the called the "Coaching Capital Of India" as it prepares students for engineering and medical entrance exams like IIT-JEE and NEET-UG In Punjab, English language is taught by coaching institutes for foreign visa aspirants to get the right IELTS score for their applications. Mukherjee Nagar and Old Rajinder Nagar in Delhi are considered a hub for UPSC Civil Services Examination coaching. To compete in these exams, Center and some state governments also provide free coaching to students, especially to students from minority communities.

Coaching classes have been blamed for the neglect of school education by students. Educationists such as Anandakrishnan have criticised the increasing importance being given to coaching classes as they put students under mental stress, less time for their hobbies and the coaching fees add to the financial burden on parents. These educationists opine that if a good schooling system is put in place, children should not need additional coaching to take any competitive examination.

The Indian education system has faced criticism for its emphasis on rote learning and intense examination pressure. This pressure has been linked to cases of mental health issues and student suicides especially in the city of Kota, Rajasthan, and other such cities like Noida also, amongst those preparing for competitive exams such as JEE and NEET-UG. In 2023, India witnessed a rise in the number of student suicides with Kota, Rajasthan witnessing a record breaking 26 suicide cases in a single year. Initiatives like the National Level Common Entrance Examination (NLCEE) provide students with exposure to various career paths and institutions, guiding them to make informed decisions about their future. By reducing uncertainty and regret in their choices, such initiatives aim to alleviate stress and help students avoid extreme responses to academic challenges.

In January 2024, the Ministry of Education issued guidelines for regulating private coaching centres, citing concerns including rising student stress, reported student suicides, safety issues and other malpractices. States and Union Territories were asked to implement suitable legal frameworks based on these guidelines. It included no enrolment of students below 16 years of age, no misleading advertisements or guaranteed ranks, mandatory counselling and student support mechanisms.

=== Corruption in education ===
Corruption in Indian education system has been eroding the quality of education and has been creating long-term negative consequences for the society. Educational corruption in India is considered one of the major contributors to domestic black money. In 2021, Manav Bharti University, a private university, was accused of selling tens of thousands of degrees for money over a decade.

=== Grade inflation ===
Grade inflation has become an issue in Indian secondary education. In CBSE, a 95 per cent aggregate is 21 times as prevalent today as it was in 2004, and a 90 per cent close to nine times as prevalent. In the ISC Board, a 95 per cent is almost twice as prevalent today as it was in 2012. CBSE called a meeting of all 40 school boards early in 2017 to urge them to discontinue "artificial spiking of marks". CBSE decided to lead by example and promised not to inflate its results. But although the 2017 results have seen a small correction, the board has clearly not discarded the practice completely. Almost 6.5 per cent of mathematics examinees in 2017 scored 95 or more – 10 times higher than in 2004 – and almost 6 per cent of physics examinees scored 95 or more, 35 times more than in 2004.

=== Overflow of Certain Fields ===
Across the nation, it has often been observed that majority of Indian parents want their children to pursue only engineering or medical fields. This is due to a belief of guaranteed employment, financial security, survival mentality, societal status, and cultural conditioning. As a result of this, along with an obsession for getting into prestigious IITs, many students in their high school are forced to sit and study for entrance exams other than their field of preference, like the JEE-Advanced for engineering and NEET for medical. This has led to development of coaching centers that tutor students for such exams, and with packed schedules issued, it has caused extreme pressure for the students, gradually affecting their mental health and no time for extra-curricular activities like arts or sports. The IITs, despite being premier institutions, do not accept SAT scores for entrance and admission, which have been noted to be comparatively easier than the JEE.

In 2012, it was noted that India had an overflow of engineering colleges/institutions, and that NASSCOM, non-governmental trade association and advocacy group, revealed in a report that only 15% of engineering graduates are employable. In 2024, that figure had dropped close to 10%, which triggered a debate of the skill gaps.

== Initiatives ==
=== Central government involvement ===
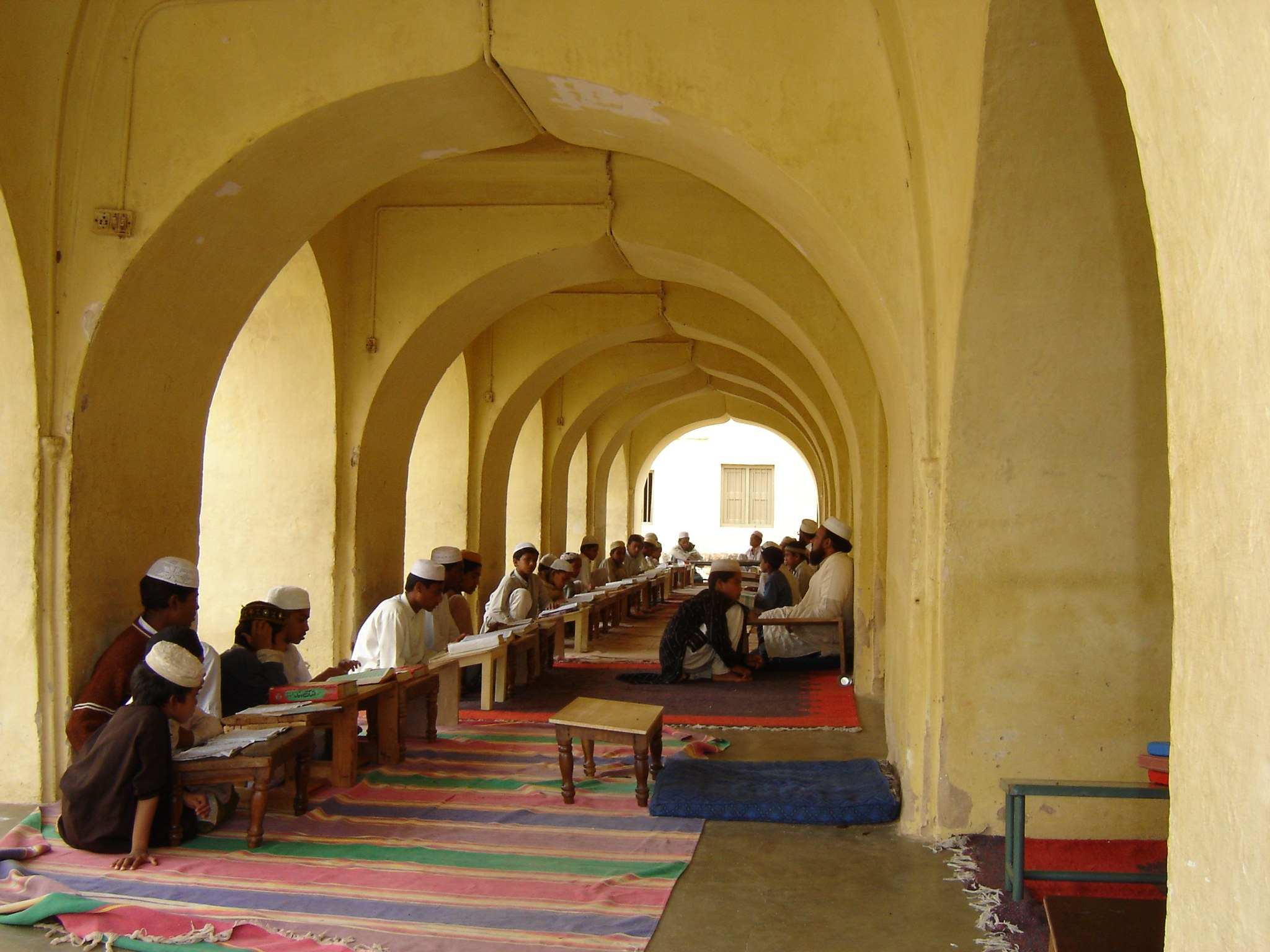
The madrasah of Jamia Masjid mosque in Srirangapatna.

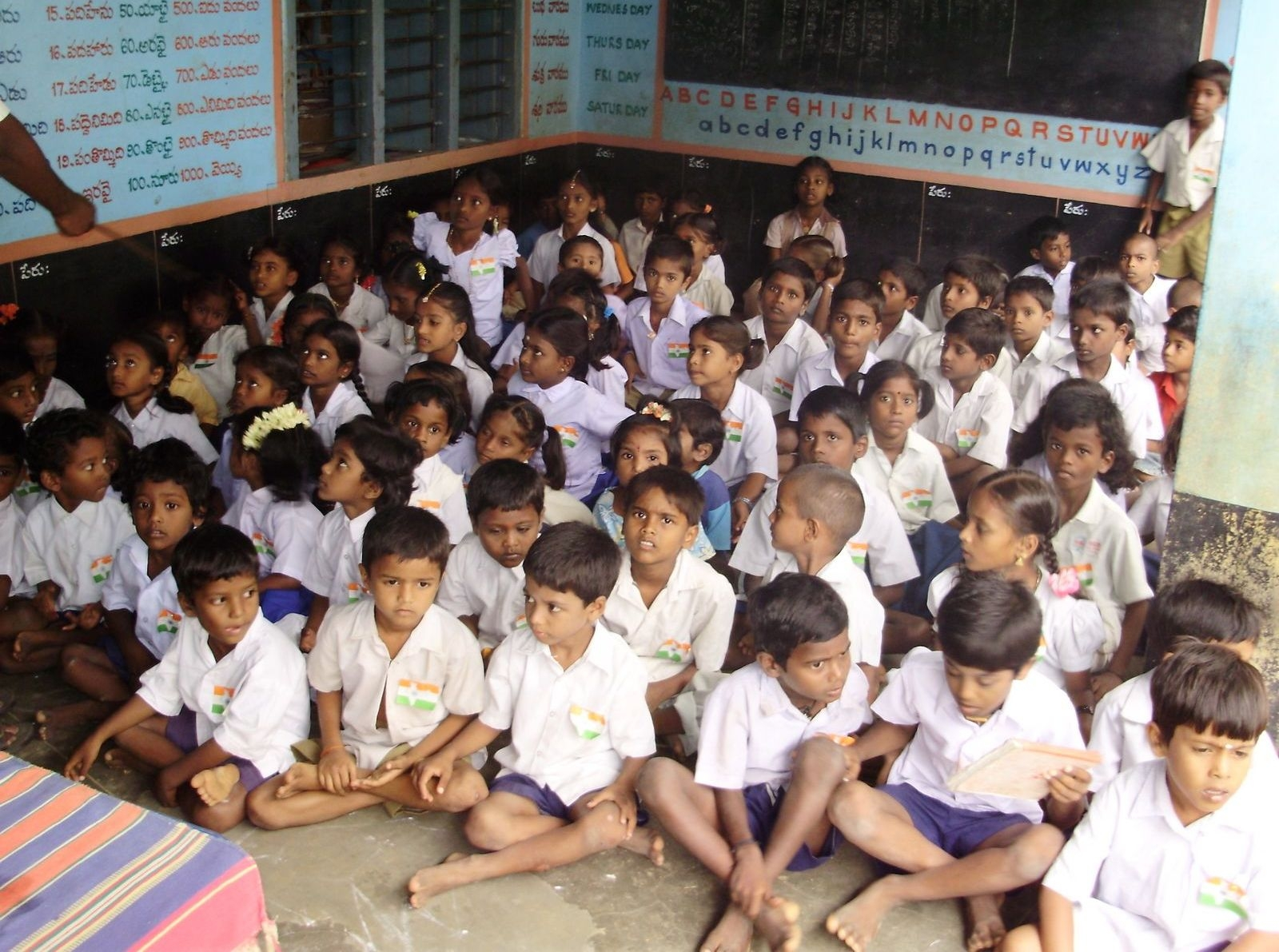
Elementary school in Chittoor. This school is part of the 'Paathshaala' project. The school educates 70 students.

Following India's independence, a number of rules were formulated for the backward Scheduled Castes and the Scheduled Tribes of India. In 1960, a list identifying 405 Scheduled Castes and 225 Scheduled Tribes was published by the central government. An amendment was made to the list in 1975, which identified 841 Scheduled Castes and 510 Scheduled Tribes. The total percentage of Scheduled Castes and Scheduled Tribes combined was found to be 24.5% with the Scheduled Castes accounting for 17% and the Scheduled Tribes accounting for the remaining 7.5%. Following the report many Scheduled Castes and Scheduled Tribes increasingly referred to themselves as Dalit, a Marathi language terminology used by B R Ambedkar which literally means "oppressed".

The Scheduled Castes and Scheduled Tribes are provided for in many of India's educational programmes. Special reservations are also provided for the Scheduled Castes and Scheduled Tribes in India, e.g. a reservation of 15% in Kendriya Vidyalaya for Scheduled Castes and another reservation of 7.5% in Kendriya Vidyalaya for Scheduled Tribes. Similar reservations are held by the Scheduled Castes and Scheduled Tribes in many schemes and educational facilities in India. The remote and far-flung regions of North-East India are provided for under the Non-Lapsible Central pool of Resources (NLCPR) since 1998–1999. The NLCPR aims to provide funds for infrastructure development in these remote areas.

Women from remote, underdeveloped areas or from weaker social groups in Andhra Pradesh, Assam, Bihar, Jharkhand, Karnataka, Kerala, Gujarat, Uttar Pradesh, and Uttarakhand, fall under the Mahila Samakhya Scheme, initiated in 1989. Apart from provisions for education this programme also aims to raise awareness by holding meetings and seminars at rural levels. The government allowed ₹340 million (US$3.6 million) during 2007–08 to carry out this scheme over 83 districts including more than 21,000 villages.

There are 68 Bal Bhavans and 10 Bal Kendra affiliated to the National Bal Bhavan. The scheme involves educational and social activities and recognising children with a marked talent for a particular educational stream. A number of programmes and activities are held under this scheme, which also involves cultural exchanges and participation in several international forums.

India's minorities, especially the ones considered 'educationally backward' by the government, are provided for in the 1992 amendment of the Indian National Policy on Education (NPE). The government initiated the Scheme of Area Intensive Programme for Educationally Backward Minorities and Scheme of Financial Assistance or Modernisation of Madarsa Education as part of its revised Programme of Action (1992). Both these schemes were started nationwide by 1994. In 2004 the Indian parliament passed an act which enabled minority education establishments to seek university affiliations if they passed the required norms.

Ministry of Human Resource and Development, Government of India in collaboration with Ministry of Electronics & Information Technology has also launched a National Scholarship Portal to provide students of India access to National and State Level Scholarships provided by various government authorities. As a Mission Mode Project under the National e-Governance Plan (NeGP), the online service enlists more than 50 scholarship programmes every year including the renowned Ministry of Minority Affairs (MOMA) Scholarships for Post-Matric and Pre-Matric studies. In the academic year 2017–18 the MOMA Scholarships facilitated the studies of 116,452 students with scholarships worth ₹3165.7 million. The National Scholarship continues to enlist scholarship programmes managed by AICTE (All India Council for Technical Education), UGC (University Grants Commission) and respective state governments.

=== Legislative framework ===
Article 45, of the Constitution of India originally stated:

The State shall endeavour to provide, within a period of ten years from the commencement of this Constitution, for free and compulsory education for all children until they complete the age of fourteen years.

This article was a directive principle of state policy within India, effectively meaning that it was within a set of rules that were meant to be followed in spirit and the government could not be held to court if the actual letter was not followed. However, the enforcement of this directive principle became a matter of debate since this principle held obvious emotive and practical value, and was legally the only directive principle within the Indian constitution to have a time limit.

Following initiatives by the Supreme Court of India during the 1990s the 93rd amendment bill suggested three separate amendments to the Indian constitution:

The constitution of India was amended to include a new article, 21A, which read:

The State shall provide free and compulsory education to all children of the age of six to fourteen years in a such manner as the State may, by law, determine.

Article 45 was proposed to be substituted by the article which read:

Provision for early childhood care and education to children below the age of six years: The State shall endeavour to provide early childhood care and education for all children until they complete the age of sixteen years.

Another article, 51A, was to additionally have the clause:

...a parent or guardian [shall] provide opportunities for education to his child or, as the case may be, [a] ward between the age of six to fourteen years.

The bill was passed unanimously in the Lok Sabha, the lower house of the Indian parliament, on 28 November 2001. It was later passed by the upper house—the Rajya Sabha—on 14 May 2002. After being signed by the President of India the Indian constitution was amended formally for the eighty sixth time and the bill came into effect. Since then those between the age of 6–14 have a fundamental right to education.

Article 46 of the Constitution of India holds that:

The State shall promote, with special care, the education and economic interests of the weaker sections of the people, and in particular of the Scheduled Castes and Scheduled Tribes, and shall protect them from social injustice and all forms of social exploitation'.

Other provisions for the Scheduled Castes and Scheduled Tribes can be found in Articles 330, 332, 335, 338–342. Both the 5th and the 6th Schedules of the Constitution also make special provisions for the Scheduled Castes and Scheduled Tribes.

=== Central government expenditure on education ===
As a part of the tenth Five-year Plan (2002–2007), the central government of India outlined an expenditure of 65.6% of its total education budget of ₹438 billion (US$4.7 billion) i.e. ₹288 billion (US$3.1 billion) on elementary education; 9.9% i.e. ₹43.25 billion (US$460 million) on secondary education; 2.9% i.e. ₹12.5 billion (US$130 million) on adult education; 9.5% i.e. ₹41.77 billion (US$450 million) on higher education; 10.7% i.e. ₹47 billion (US$500 million) on technical education; and the remaining 1.4% i.e. ₹6.24 billion (US$67 million) on miscellaneous education schemes.

During the Financial Year 2011–12, the Central Government of India has allocated ₹ 38,957 crore for the Department of School Education and Literacy which is the main department dealing with primary education in India. Within this allocation, a major share of ₹ 21,000 crore, is for the flagship programme 'Sarva Siksha Abhiyan'. However, budgetary allocation of ₹ 210,000 million is considered very low in view of the officially appointed Anil Bordia Committee recommendation of ₹ 356.59 billion for the year 2011–12. This higher allocation was required to implement the recent legislation, the 'Right of Children to Free and Compulsory Education Act, 2009'. In recent times, several major announcements have been made for developing the poor state of affairs in the education sector in India, the most notable ones being those of the National Common Minimum Programme (NCMP) of the United Progressive Alliance (UPA) government. These announcements were: (a) To progressively increase expenditure on education to around 6% of GDP. (b) To support this increase in expenditure on education, and to increase the quality of education, there would be an imposition of an education cess over all central government taxes. (c) To ensure that no one is denied of education due to economic backwardness and poverty. (d) To make right to education a fundamental right for all children in the age group 6–14 years. (e) To universalise education through its flagship programmes such as Sarva Shiksha Abhiyan and Midday Meal Scheme.

However, even after five years of the implementation of NCMP, not much progress has been seen on this front. Although the country has targeted devoting a 6% share of its GDP towards the educational sector, India's performance has definitely fallen short of expectations. Expenditure on education has steadily risen from 0.64% of GDP in 1951–52 to 2.31% in 1970–71 and thereafter reached the peak of 4.26% in 2000–01. However, it declined to 3.49% in 2004–05. There is a definite need to step up again. As a proportion of total government expenditure, it has declined from around 11.1% in 2000–2001 to around 9.98% during the UPA's rule, even though ideally it should be around 20% of the total budget. A policy brief issued by [Network for Social Accountability (NSA)] titled "[NSA Response to Education Sector Interventions in Union Budget: UPA Rule and the Education Sector]" provides a significant revelation of this fact. Due to a declining priority of education in the public policy paradigm in India, there has been an exponential growth in the private expenditure on education also. [As per the available information, the private out-of-pocket expenditure by the working class population for the education of their children in India has increased by around 1150 percent or around 12.5 times over the last decade].

== National Education Policy 2020 ==
The central government of India introduced the National Education Policy 2020 (NEP 2020) which is expected to bring profound changes to education in India. The policy, approved by the Cabinet of India on 27 July 2020, outlines the vision of India's new education system. The new policy replaces the 1986 National Policy on Education. The policy is a comprehensive framework for elementary education to higher education as well as vocational training in both rural and urban India. It aims to transform India's education system by 2021.

The National Education Policy 2020 has 'emphasised' on the use of mother tongue or local language as the medium of instruction till Class 5 while, recommending its continuance till Class 8 and beyond. It also states that no language will be imposed on the students. The language policy in NEP is a broad guideline and advisory in nature; and it is up to the states, institutions, and schools to decide on the implementation. Education in India is a Concurrent List subject.

NEP 2020 outlines the vision of India's School education system. The new policy replaces the previous National Policy on Education, 1986. The policy is a comprehensive framework for elementary education to higher education as well as vocational training in both rural and urban India. The policy aims to transform India's education system by 2021. As per NEP2020, the "10 + 2" structure is replaced with "5+3+3+4" model. 5+3+3+4 refers to 5 foundational years, whether in an anganwadi, pre-school or balvatika. This is followed by 3 years of preparatory learning from classes 3 to 5. This is followed by a middle stage that is of 3 years in length and finally a 4-year secondary stage till class 12 or 18 years of age. This model will be implemented as follows:

Instead of exams being held every academic year, school students attend three exams, in classes 2, 5 and 8. Board exams are held for classes 10 and 12. Standards for Board exams is established by an assessment body, PARAKH (Performance Assessment, Review and Analysis of Knowledge for Holistic Development). To make them easier, these exams would be conducted twice a year, with students being offered up to two attempts. The exam itself would have two parts, namely the objective and the descriptive.

NEP's higher education policy proposes a 4-year multi-disciplinary bachelor's degree in an undergraduate programme with multiple exit options. These will include professional and vocational areas and will be implemented

- A certificate after completing 1 year of study (vocational)
- A diploma after completing 2 years of study (vocational)
- A Bachelor's degree after completion of a 3-year programme (professional)
- A 4-year multidisciplinary bachelor's degree (the preferred option) (professional)

Category		Grade	Ages	Comments
Compulsory education (India)
Foundational Stage	Preschool (Urban) / Anganwadi (Rural)	Pre-kindergarten	3–4	This will cover children of ages 3–8 years. The focus of studies will be in activity-based learning.
Foundational Stage	Preschool (Urban) / Anganwadi (Rural)	Kindergarten	4–6	This will cover children of ages 3–8 years. The focus of studies will be in activity-based learning.
Foundational Stage	Primary School	1st grade	6–7	This will cover children of ages 3–8 years. The focus of studies will be in activity-based learning.
Foundational Stage	Primary School	2nd grade	7–8	This will cover children of ages 3–8 years. The focus of studies will be in activity-based learning.
Preparatory Stage	Primary School	3rd grade	8–9	It will gradually introduce subjects like speaking, reading, writing, physical education, languages, art, science and mathematics.
Preparatory Stage	Primary School	4th grade	9–10	It will gradually introduce subjects like speaking, reading, writing, physical education, languages, art, science and mathematics.
Preparatory Stage	Primary School	5th grade	10–11	It will gradually introduce subjects like speaking, reading, writing, physical education, languages, art, science and mathematics.
Middle Stage	Middle School	6th grade	11–12	It will introduce students to the more abstract concepts in subjects of mathematics, sciences, social sciences, arts and humanities.
Middle Stage	Middle School	7th grade	12–13	It will introduce students to the more abstract concepts in subjects of mathematics, sciences, social sciences, arts and humanities.
Middle Stage	Middle School	8th grade	13–14	It will introduce students to the more abstract concepts in subjects of mathematics, sciences, social sciences, arts and humanities.
Secondary Stage	Junior High school	9th grade	14–15	These 4 years of study are intended to inculcate multidisciplinary study, coupled with depth and critical thinking. Multiple options of subjects will be provided.
Secondary Stage	Junior High school	10th grade	15–16	These 4 years of study are intended to inculcate multidisciplinary study, coupled with depth and critical thinking. Multiple options of subjects will be provided.
Secondary Stage	Senior High school	11th grade	16–17	These 4 years of study are intended to inculcate multidisciplinary study, coupled with depth and critical thinking. Multiple options of subjects will be provided.
Secondary Stage	Senior High school	12th grade	17–18	These 4 years of study are intended to inculcate multidisciplinary study, coupled with depth and critical thinking. Multiple options of subjects will be provided.
Higher education (India)
College (University)	Undergraduate school	First year	18–19	1-year Vocational Certificate
College (University)	Undergraduate school	Second year	19–20	2-years Vocational Diploma
College (University)	Undergraduate school	Third year	20–21	3-years bachelor's degree (Optional and limited)
College (University)	Undergraduate school	Fourth year	21–22	4-years multidisciplinary bachelor's degree (Preferred)
College (University)	Undergraduate school	Fifth year	22–23	5-years MBBS, a bachelor's degree in medicine.
College (University)	Graduate school	First year	21+	(with various degrees and curricular partitions thereof)
College (University)	Graduate school	Second year	22+	(with various degrees and curricular partitions thereof)
College (University)	Graduate school	Third year	23+	(with various degrees and curricular partitions thereof)
College (University)	Doctorate		24+	
Research
	Postdoctoral			
Continuing education
Vocational school			18 and up	
Adult education			18 and up	

=== Conceptual understanding of inclusive education ===
The new National Education Policy 2020 (NEP 2020) introduced by the Central Government is expected to bring profound changes to education in India. The policy approved by the Union Cabinet of India on 29 July 2020, outlines the vision of India's new education system. The new policy replaces the 1986 National Policy on Education. The policy is a comprehensive framework for elementary education to higher education as well as vocational training in both rural and urban India. The policy aims to transform India's education system by 2021.

Shortly after the release of the policy, the government clarified that no one will be forced to study any particular language and that the medium of instruction will not be shifted from English to any regional language. The language policy in NEP is a broad guideline and advisory in nature; and it is up to the states, institutions, and schools to decide on the implementation. Education in India is a Concurrent List subject.

Although it may not be appropriate to judge the adoption of a northern concept in the south from a northern perspective, hasty use of such globalised terminology without engaging with the thinking behind it may present no more than empty rhetoric, whatever the context. clearly perceives inclusive education as "...a concept that has been adopted from the international discourse, but has not been engaged with in the Indian scenario." She supports this view of lack of conceptual engagement through data collected in semi-structured interviews for her PhD research, where she found that: Many interviewees concurred with the opinions reflected in government documents that inclusion is about children with special needs, as reflected by a disabling condition. A handful of others argue that inclusive education should not be limited to children with disabilities, as it holds relevance for all marginalised groups. Though they were quick to accept that this thinking has not yet prevailed. Indian understandings of disability and educational needs are demonstrated through the interchangeable use of several English terms which hold different meanings in the north. For example, children with special needs or special educational needs tend to be perceived as children with disabilities in India, as demonstrated by Mukhopadhyay and Mani's (2002) chapter on 'Education of Children with Special Needs' in a NIEPA government-funded research report, which solely pertains to children with disabilities. In contrast, the intention of Mary Warnock's term 'special educational needs', coined in the UK in 1978, was to imply that any child, with an impairment or not, may have an individual educational need at some point in their school career (e.g. dyslexia, or language of instruction as a second language) which the teacher should adapt to. This further implies that a child with a disability may not have a special educational need while their able-bodied peers could (Giffard-Lindsay, 2006). In addition, despite the 1987 Mental Health Act finally separating the meaning of learning disability from that of mental illness in India, there is still some confusion in understanding, with the 1995 Persons with Disabilities Act listing both intellectual disability and mental illness as categories of disability. Ignorance and fear of genetic inheritance adds to the societal stigma of both. 'Inclusive' and 'integrated' education are also concepts that are used interchangeably, understood as the placement of children with disabilities in mainstream classrooms, with the provision of aids and appliances, and specialist training for the teacher on how to 'deal with' students with disabilities. There is little engagement with the connotations of school, curriculum, and teacher flexibility for all children. These rigid, categorical interpretations of subtly different northern concepts are perhaps a reflection of not only the government tendency to categories and label (Julka, 2005; Singal, 2005a) but also a cultural one, most explicitly enforced through the rigidly categorised caste system.

=== Adult and youth literacy rates ===
Adult literacy rates
Country	15+ years old		15–24 years	
Country	Male	Female	Male	Female
Bangladesh	51.7	33.1	59.4	43.1
Pakistan	63.0	36.0	75.8	54.7
Sri Lanka	92.3	89.1	95.1	96.1
India	73.4	47.8	84.2	67.7
China	95.1	86.5	99.2	98.5
Brazil	88.4	88.8	95.8	97.9
Russian Federation	99.7	99.2	99.7	99.8
World	87.2	77.3	90.5	84.1
Developing countries	83.5	70.1	88.6	80.9
Sub-Saharan Africa	69.5	53.5	77.8	68.3

== See also ==
- Minister of Education (India)
- Ministry of Education (India)
- Gender inequality in India
- Gurukula
- List of design colleges and institutes of India
- List of schools in India
- Macaulayism, historical background to the implementation of English education in India.
- National Translation Mission
- New Education Policy
- NCERT textbook controversies
- Open access in India
- Two Million Minutes, documentary film
- Dreams Choked, documentary film
- Happiness Curriculum
