= List of Ramakrishna Mission institutions =

The following is the list of institutions started by/affiliated to Ramakrishna Mission.

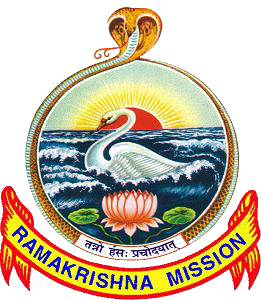
Logo of Ramakrishna Mission

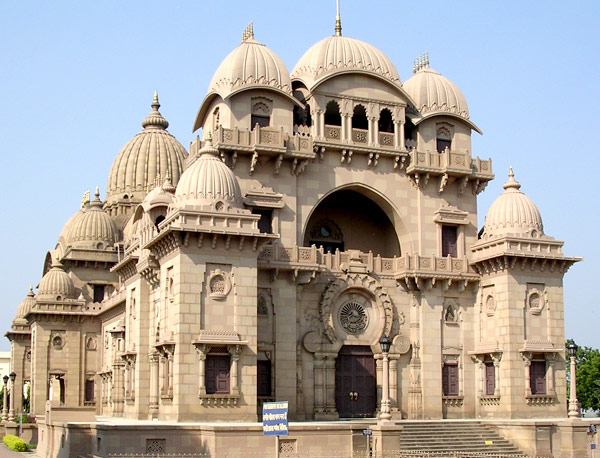
Belur Math is the headquarters of Ramakrishna Mission

As of 1 April 2024, the Ramakrishna Math and the Ramakrishna Mission have 279 branch centres all over the world. Of these, 211 centres are in India and the remaining 68 are in 24 other countries (27 in Bangladesh, 14 in the USA, 3 in Brazil, 2 each in Canada, Russia and South Africa, and one each in Argentina, Australia, Fiji, France, Germany, Ireland, Japan, Malaysia, Mauritius, Nepal, Netherlands, New Zealand, Philippines, Singapore, Sri Lanka, Switzerland, UK and Zambia). Further, there are 56 sub-centres (24 within India and 32 outside India) functioning under the above branch centres. The Math and Mission run 748 educational institutions (including 12 colleges, 22 higher secondary schools, 41 secondary schools, 135 schools of other grades, 4 polytechnics, 48 vocational training centres, 118 hostels, 7 orphanages, etc.) with a total student population of more than 2,00,000. Besides these branch centres, there are about one thousand unaffiliated centres (popularly called 'private centres') all over the world started by the devotees and followers of Sri Ramakrishna and Swami Vivekananda.

The centres of the Ramakrishna Order outside India fall into two broad categories. In countries such as Bangladesh, Nepal, Sri Lanka, Fiji and Mauritius, the nature of service activities is very much similar to India (which is humanitarianism and spirituality). In other parts of the world, especially in Europe, Canada, United States, Japan, and Australia, the work is mostly confined to the preaching of Vedanta, the publication of books and journals and personal guidance in spiritual matters. Many of the centres outside India are called as the 'Vedanta Society' or 'Vedanta Centre'.

== India ==
=== West Bengal ===
==== Educational institutions ====
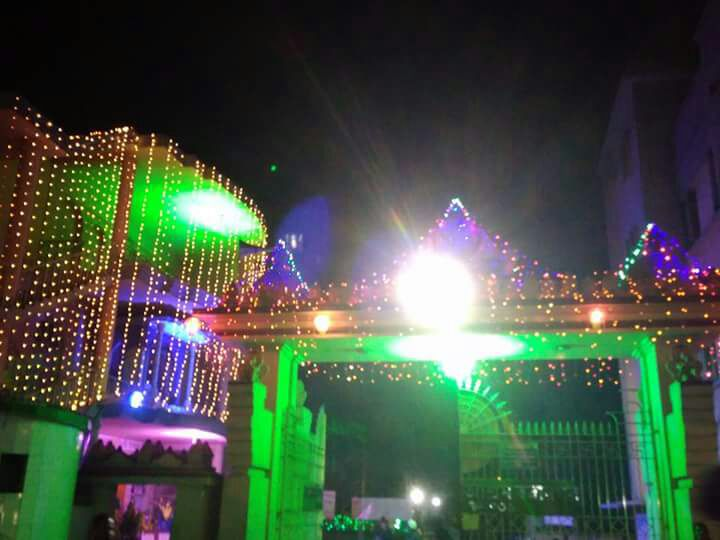
Baranagore Ramakrishna Mission Ashrama High School

- Baranagore Ramakrishna Mission Ashrama High School, Baranagar, Dist.: North 24 Parganas

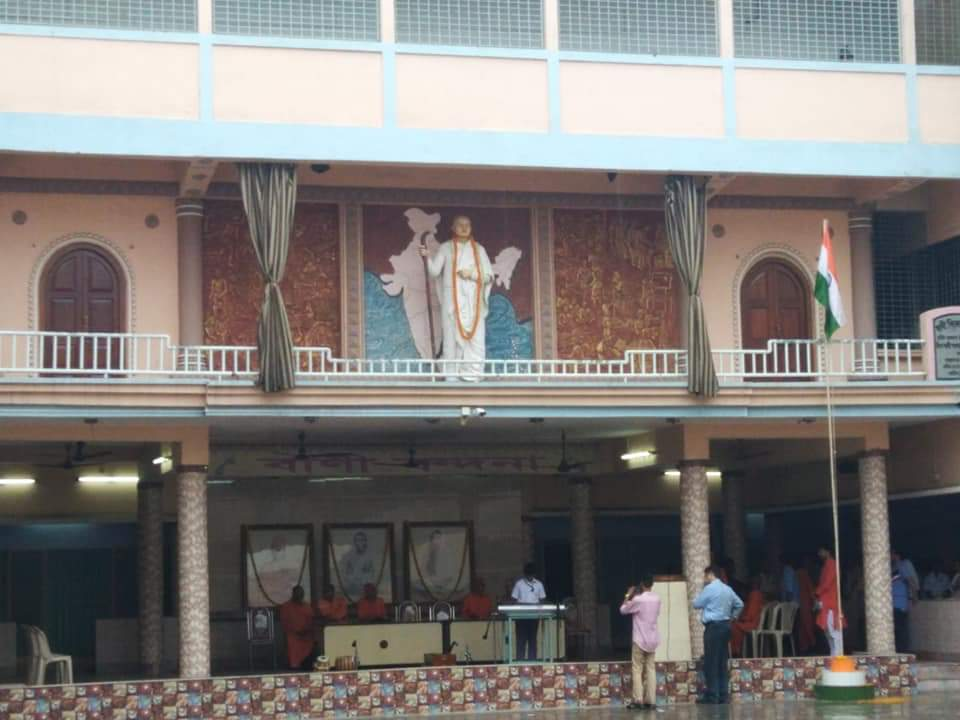
Ramakrishna Mission Centenary Primary School, Baranagore

- Ramakrishna Mission Centenary Primary School, Baranagore, Baranagar
- Taki Ramakrishna Mission High School, Taki, District: North 24 Parganas
- Asansol Ramakrishna Mission High School, Asansol, District: West Burdwan
- Ramharipur Ramakrishna Mission High School, Ramharipur, Dist.: Bankura
- Ramakrishna Mission Vivekananda Vidyamandir, Malda
- Ramakrishna Mission Boys' Home High School, Rahara, District: North 24 Parganas

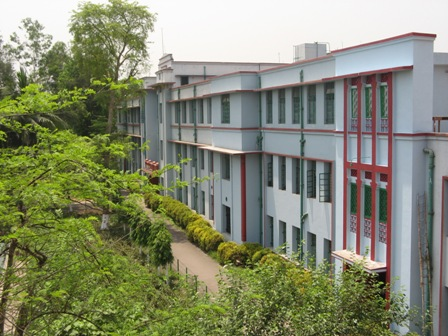
Rahara RKMVC College

- Ramakrishna Mission Vivekananda Centenary College, Rahara, District: North 24 Parganas
- Ramakrishna Mission Calcutta Students' Home, Belgharia, District: North 24 Parganas

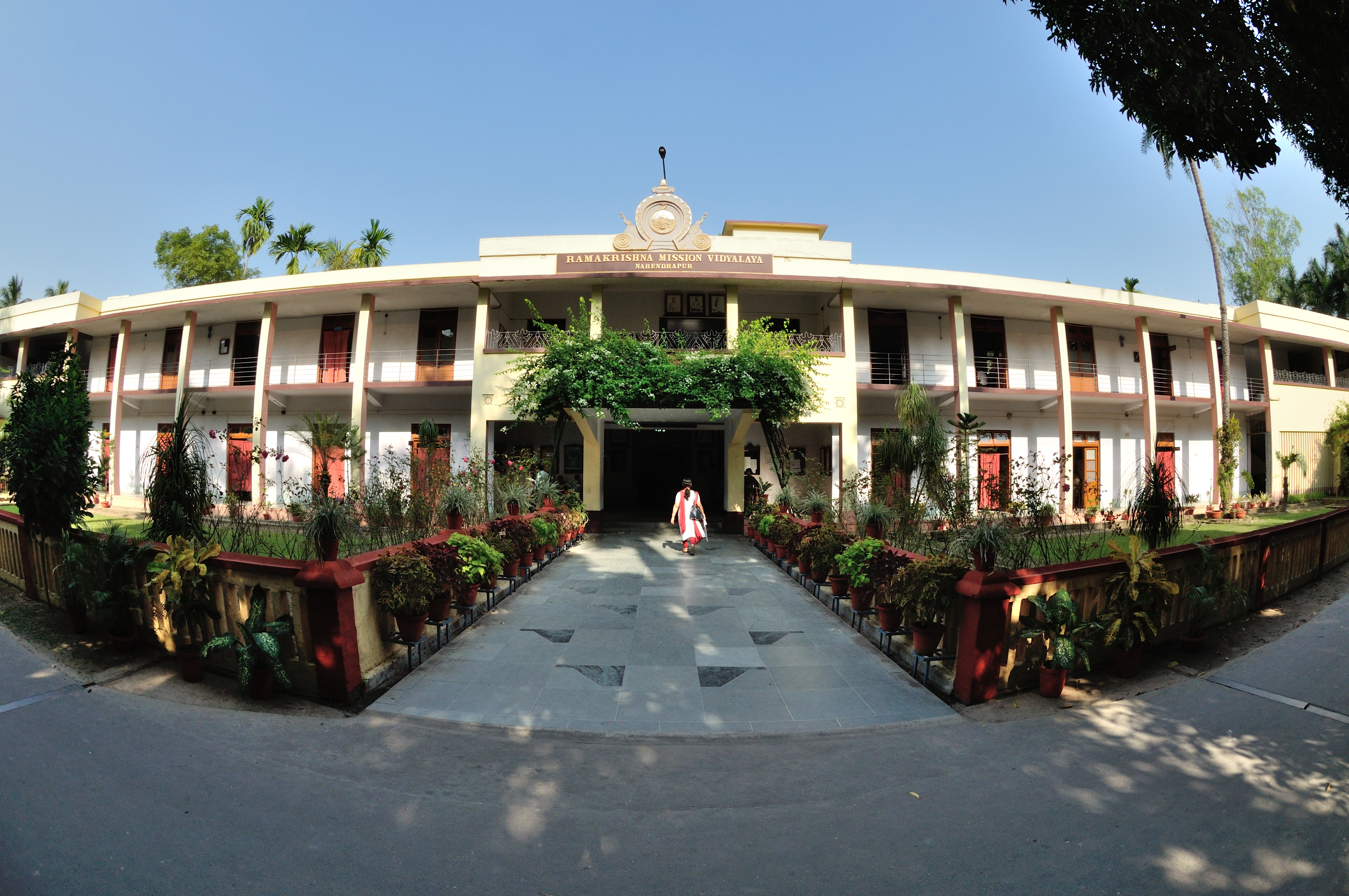
Narendrapur Ramakrishna Mission Vidyalaya

- Ramakrishna Mission Vidyalaya, Narendrapur

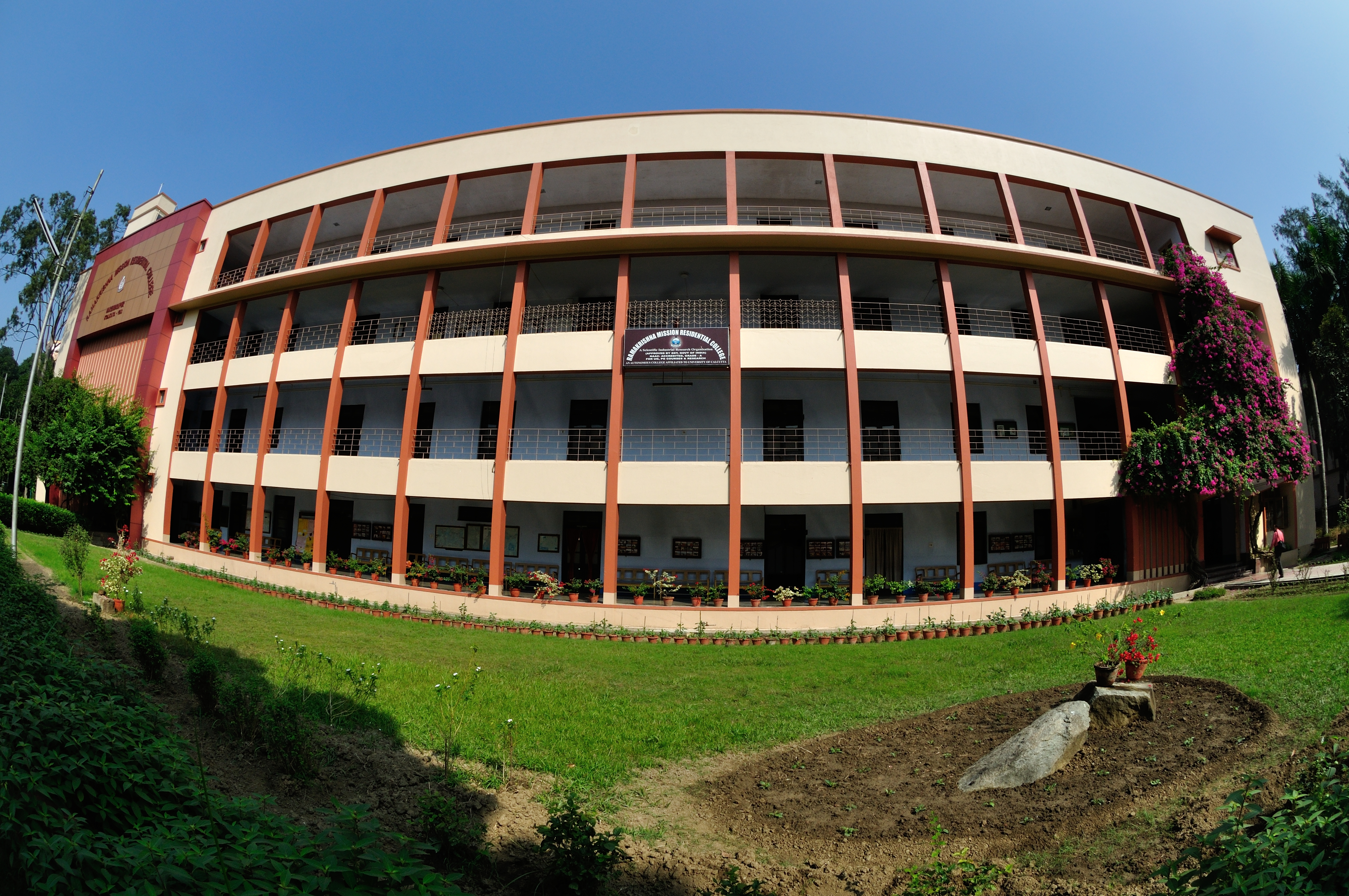
Narendrapur Ramakrishna Mission Residential College

- Ramakrishna Mission Residential College, Narendrapur

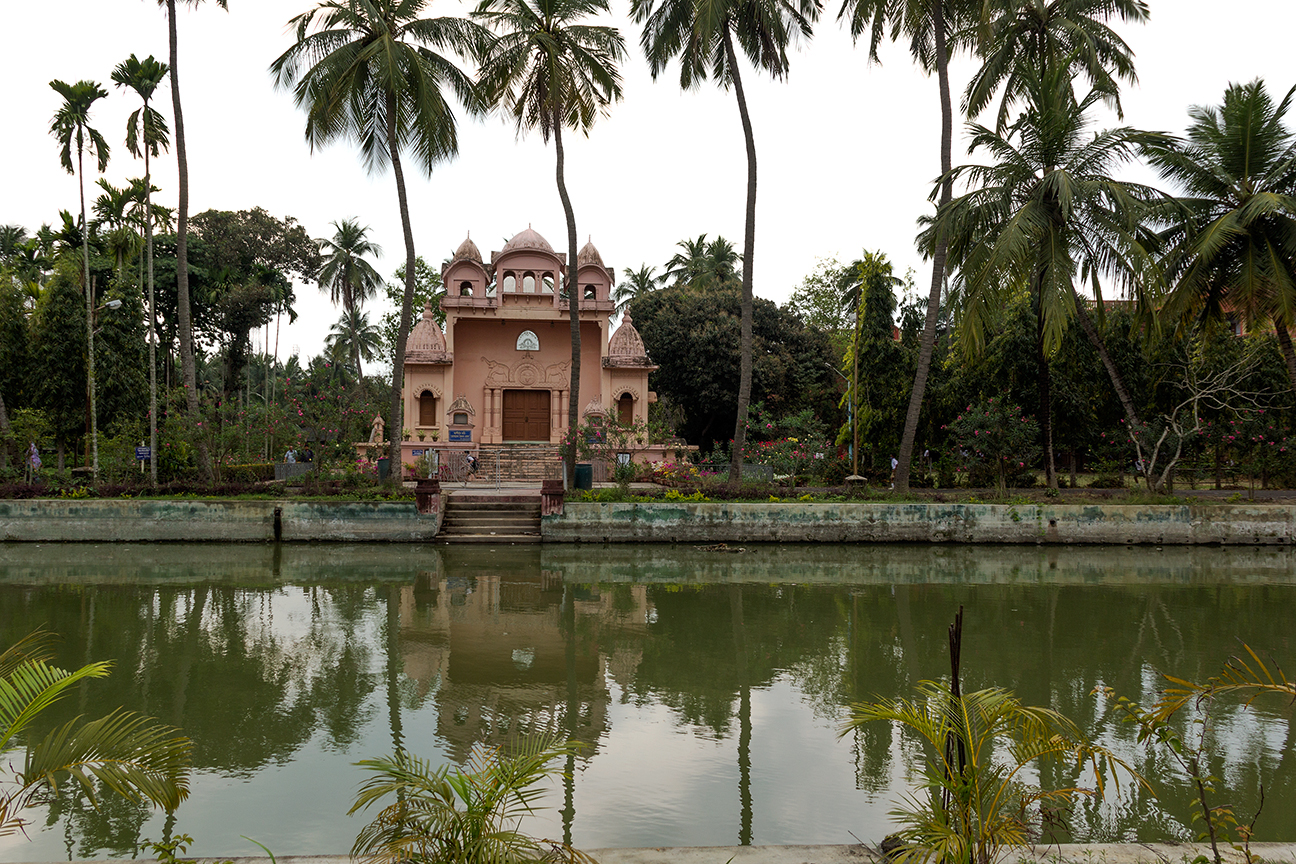
Sarisha RKM

- Ramakrishna Mission Siksha Mandir, Sarisha, Sarisha, District: South 24 Parganas
- Ramakrishna Mission Vidyamandira, Belur Math, District: Howrah

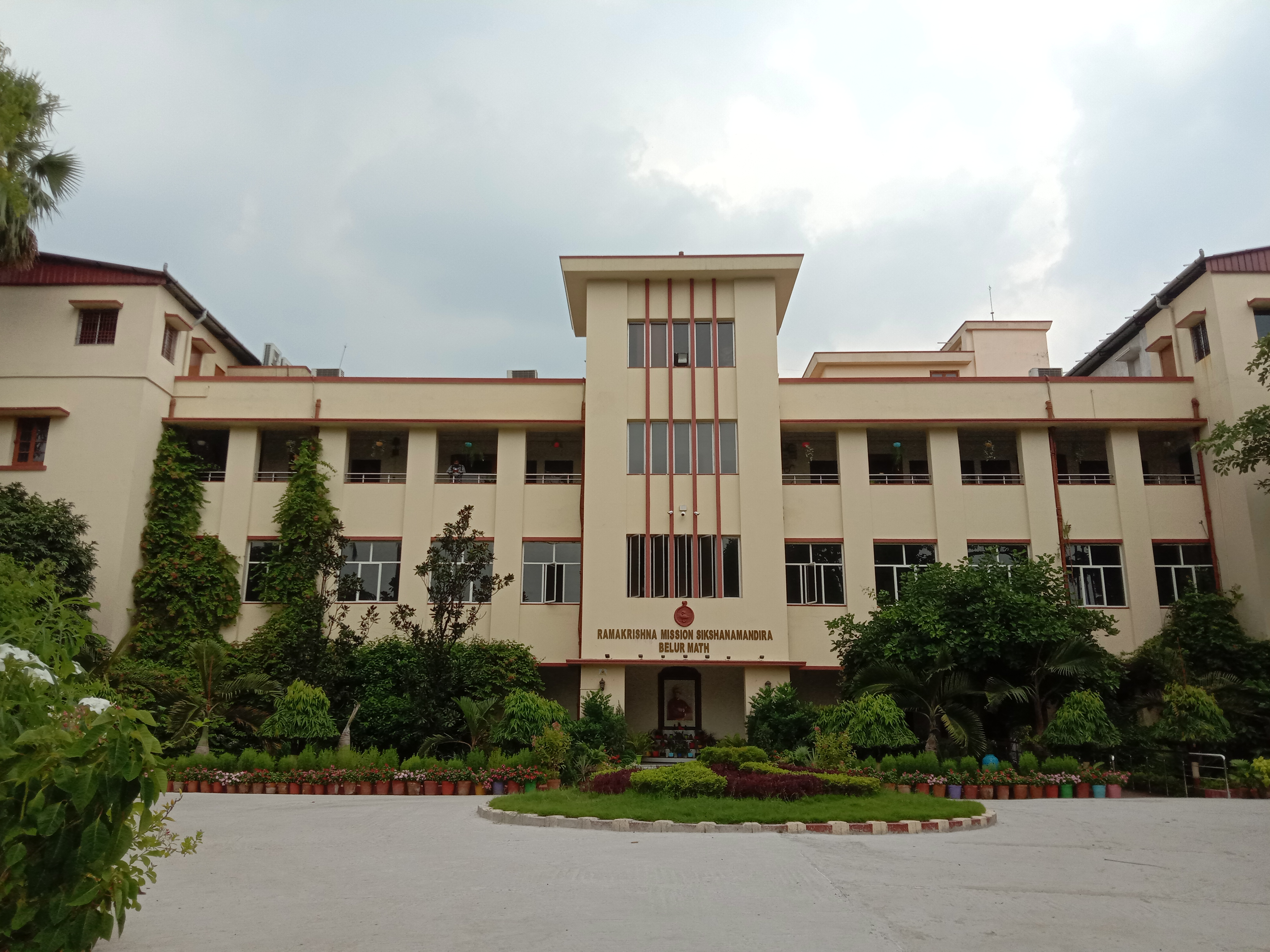
Ramakrishna Mission Shikshanamandira

- Ramakrishna Mission Shikshanamandira, Belur Math, District: Howrah
- Ramakrishna Mission Shilpayatana (I.T.I. & Higher Secondary Vocational), Belur Math, District: Howrah
- Ramakrishna Mission Vidyabhaban, Midnapore
- Ramakrishna Mission Multipurpose School, Kamarpukur

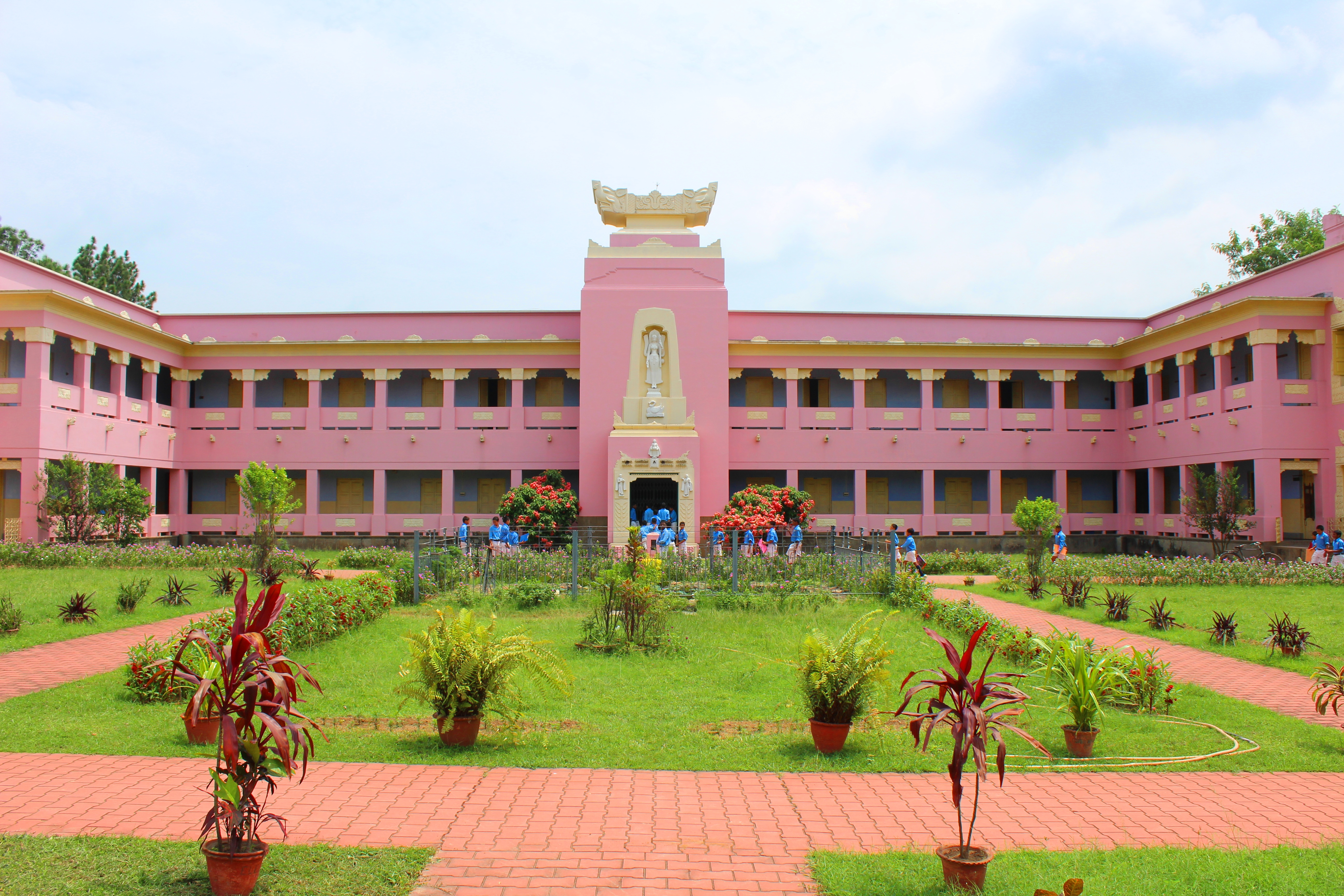
Purulia Ramakrishna Mission

- Ramakrishna Mission Vidyapith, Purulia

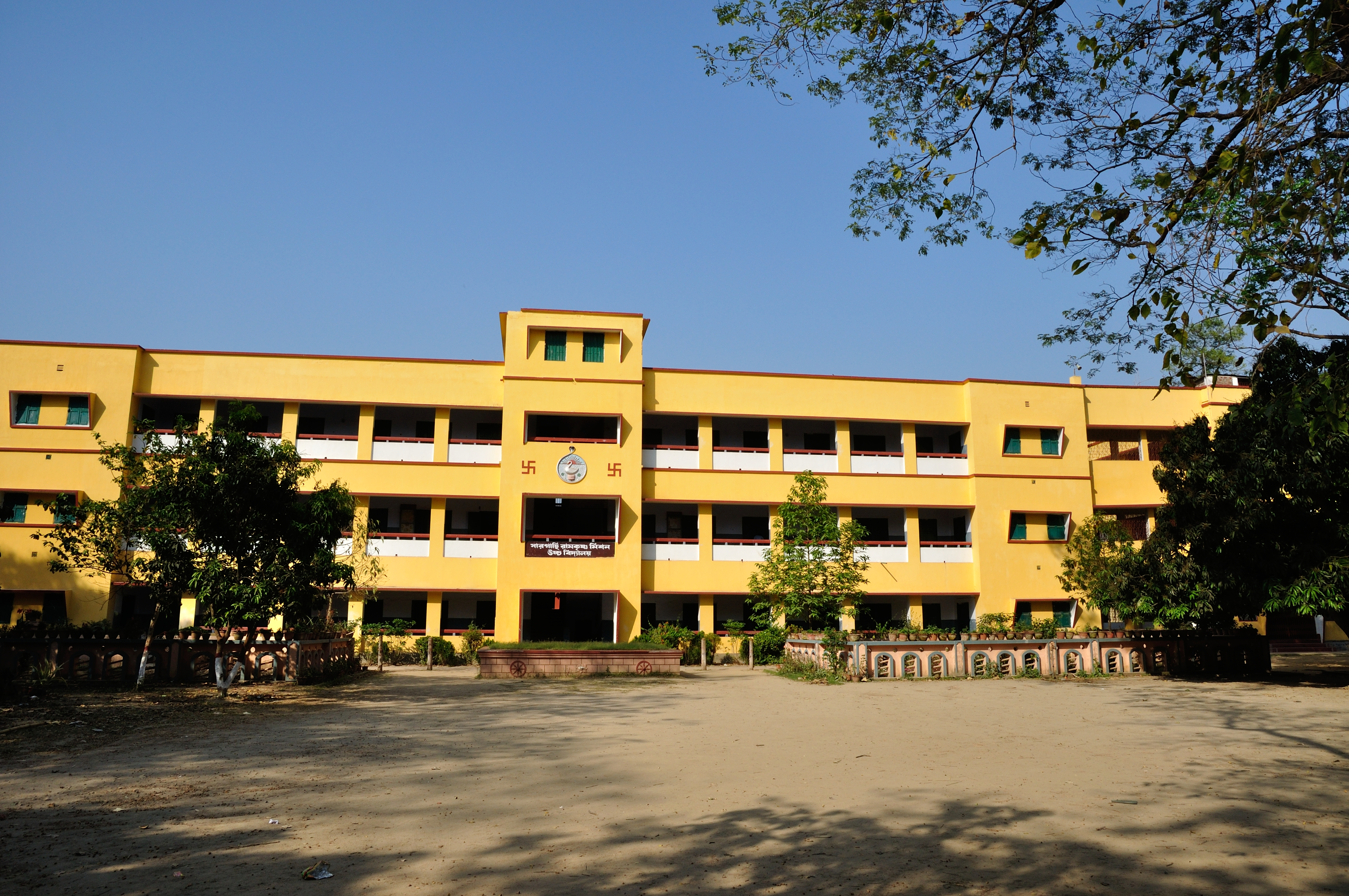
Sargachi Ramakrishna Mission

- Sargachi Ramakrishna Mission High School, Sargachi, Murshidabad

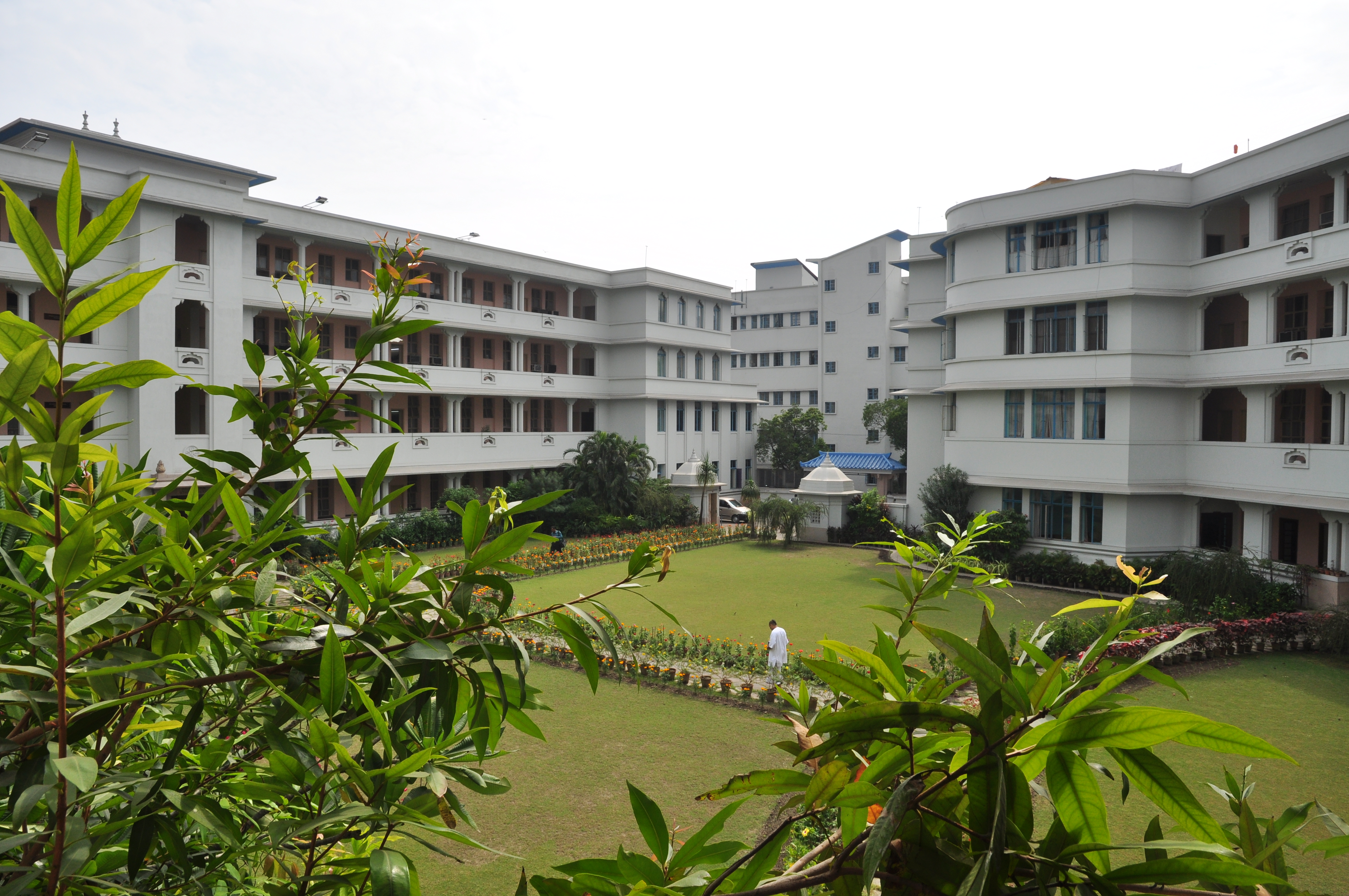
RKM Institute of Culture

- Ramakrishna Mission Institute of Culture, Golpark, Kolkata

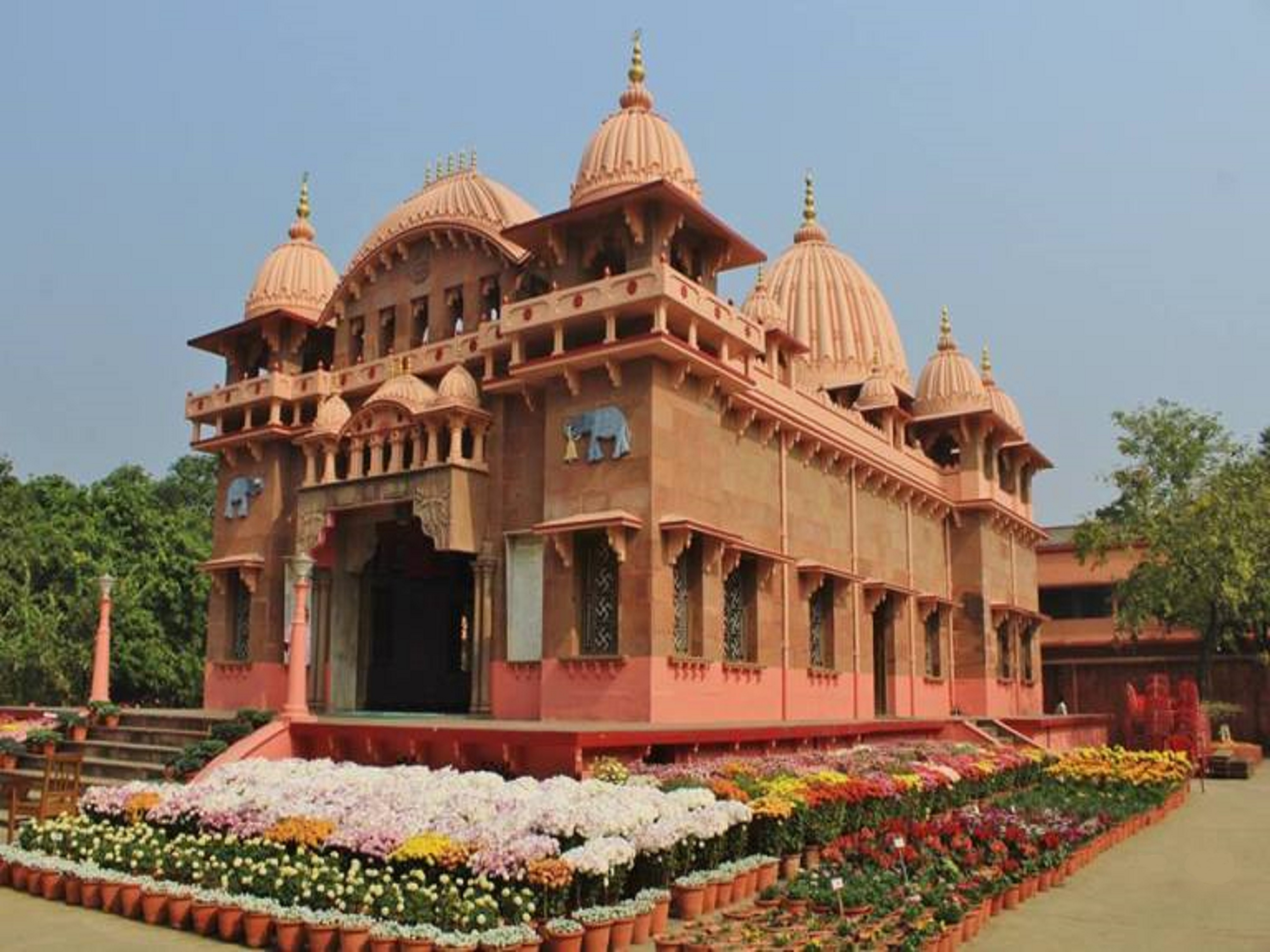
Nimpith RKM

- Nimpith Ramakrishna Mission Ashrama, Jaynagar Majilpur, District: South 24 Parganas
- Ramakrishna Mission Sarada Vidyapith, Jayrambati, Bankura

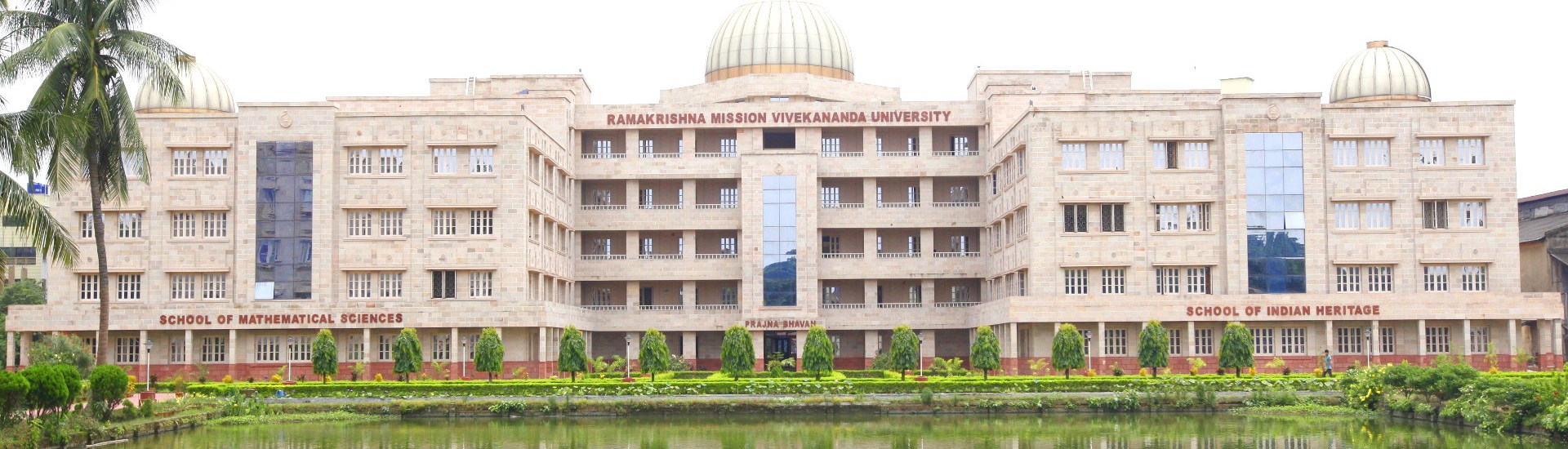
Ramakrishna Mission Vivekananda Educational and Research Institute

- Ramakrishna Mission Vivekananda Educational and Research Institute, Belur

==== Other institutions ====
- Belur Math (Headquarters of Ramakrishna Mission), Belur, Howrah

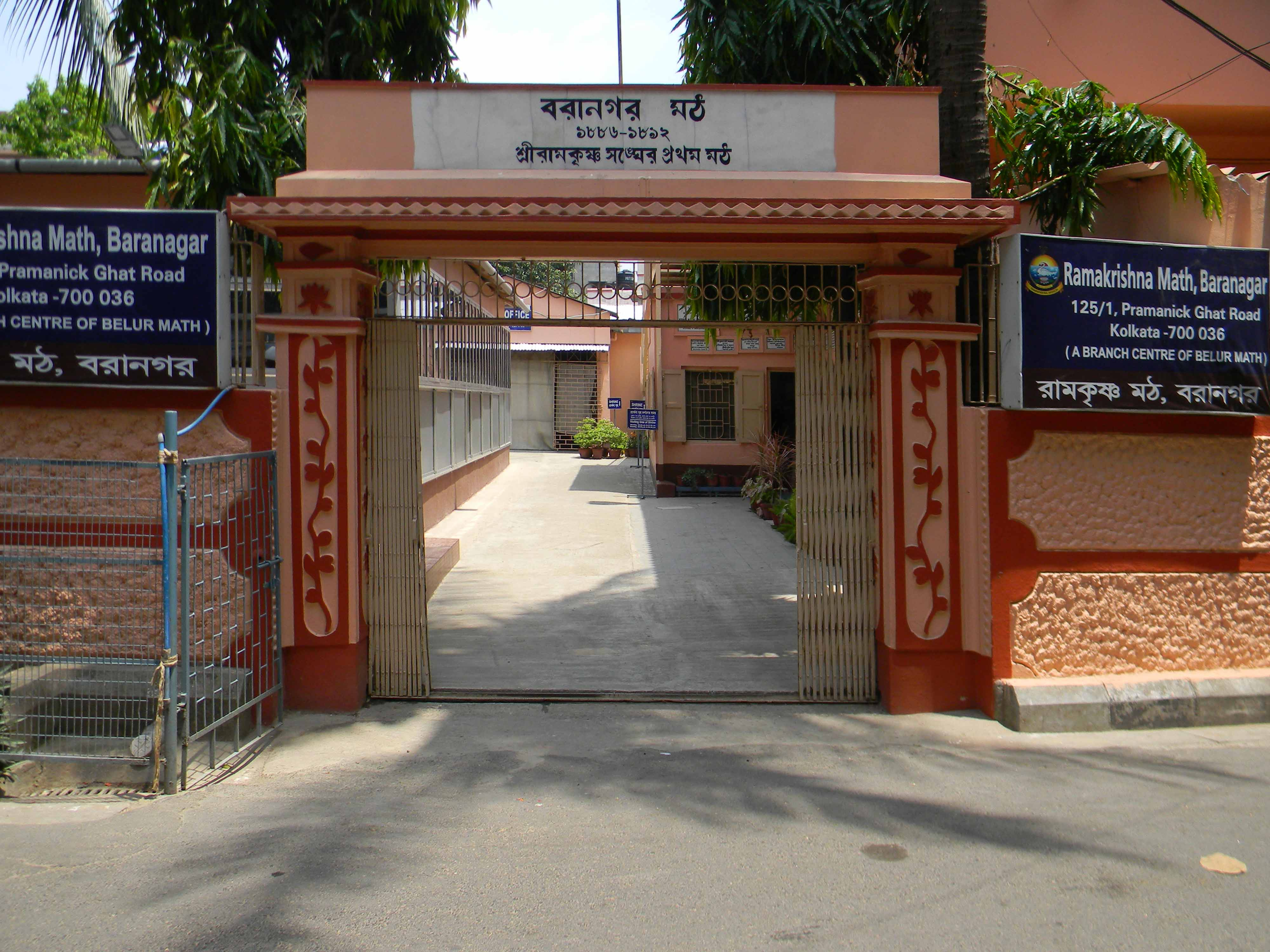
Baranagar Math

- Baranagar Math, Baranagar (first monastery of Ramakrishna Order)
- Alambazar Math, Baranagar (second monastery of Ramakrishna Order)

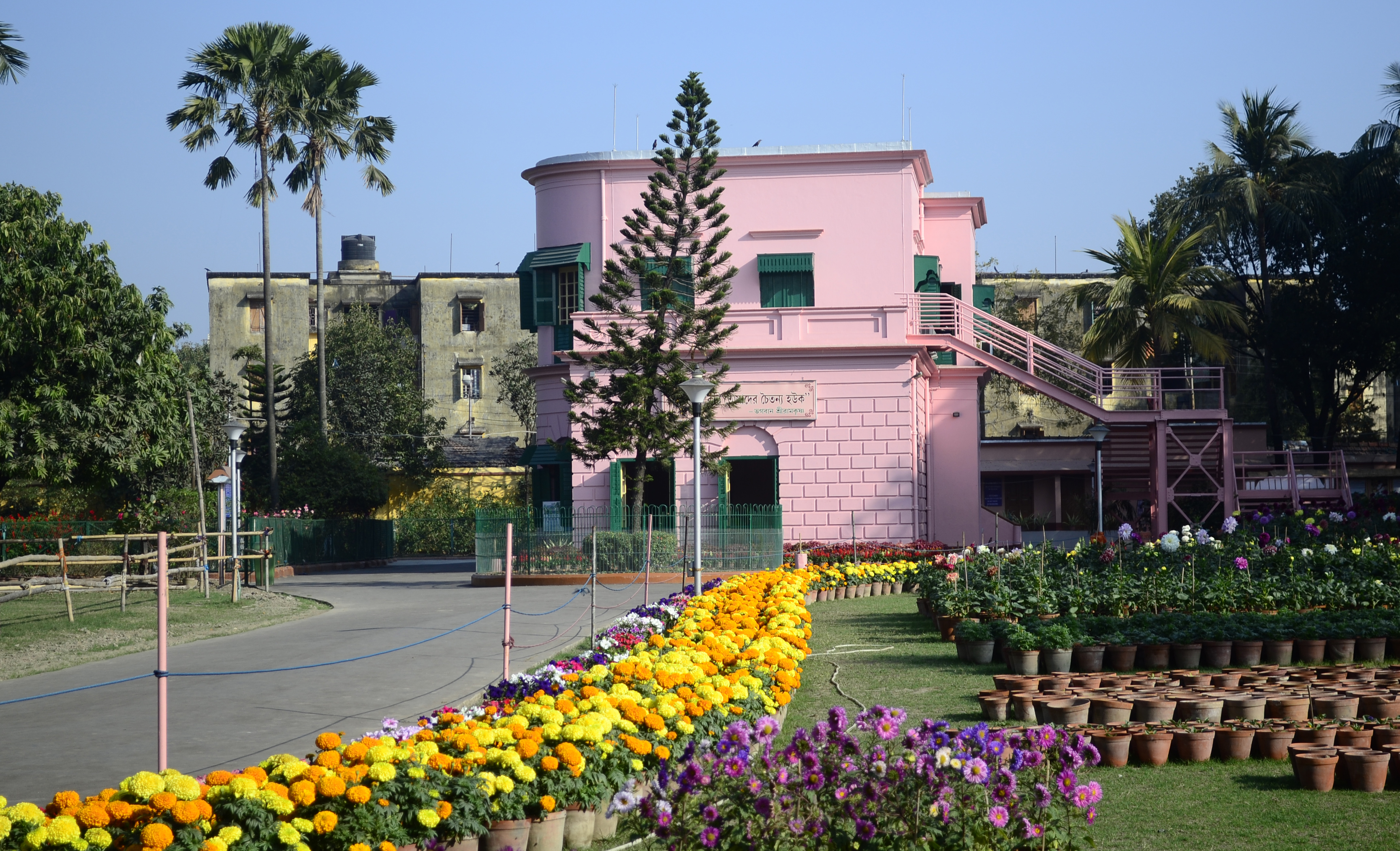
Cossipore Garden House

- Garden House (Udyan Bati), Cossipore, Kolkata
- Ramakrishna Mission Seva Pratishthan–Vivekananda Institute of Medical Sciences, Kolkata
- Ramakrishna Stadium, Narendrapur

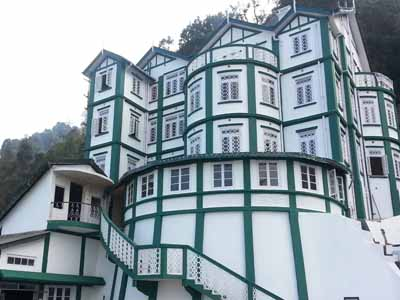
Roy Villa

- Roy Villa, Darjeeling

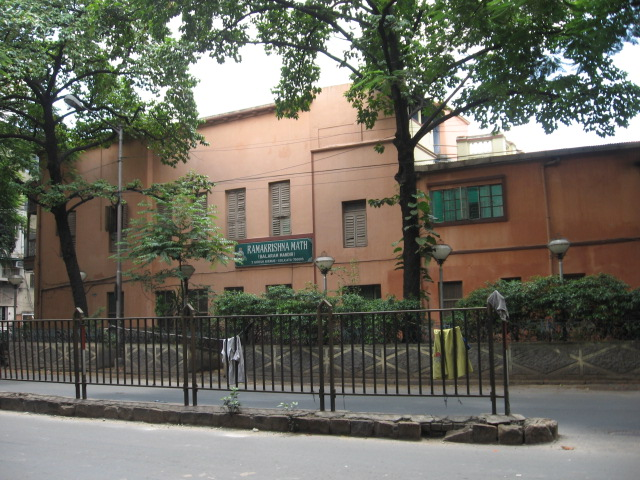
Balaram Mandir

- Balaram Mandir, Baghbazar, Kolkata
- Ramakrishna Mission Sevashrama, Sargachi

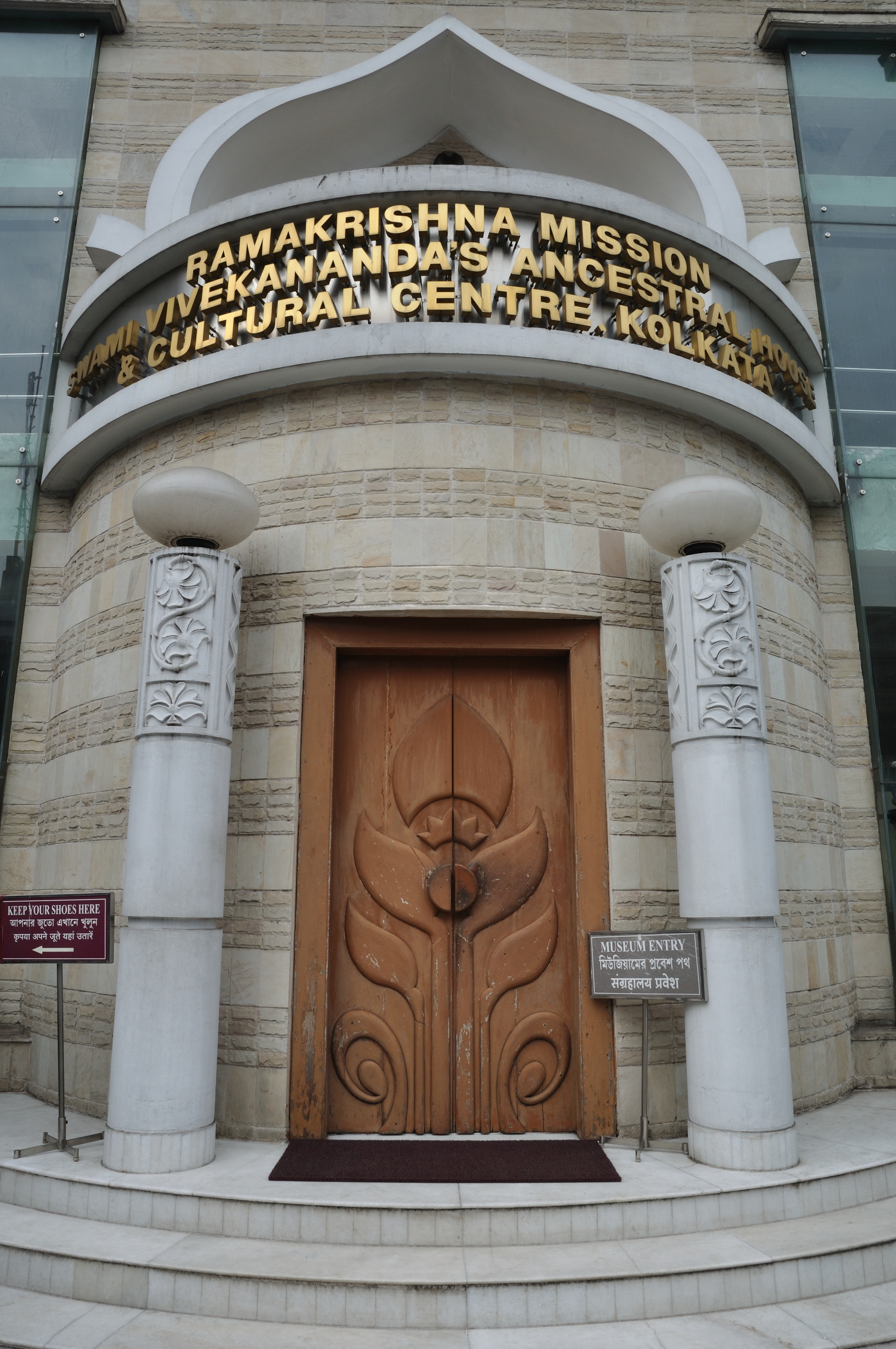
Swami Vivekananda's Ancestral House & Cultural Centre

- Ramakrishna Mission Swami Vivekananda's Ancestral House and Cultural Centre, Kolkata
- Ramakrishna Sarada Math, Baghbazar

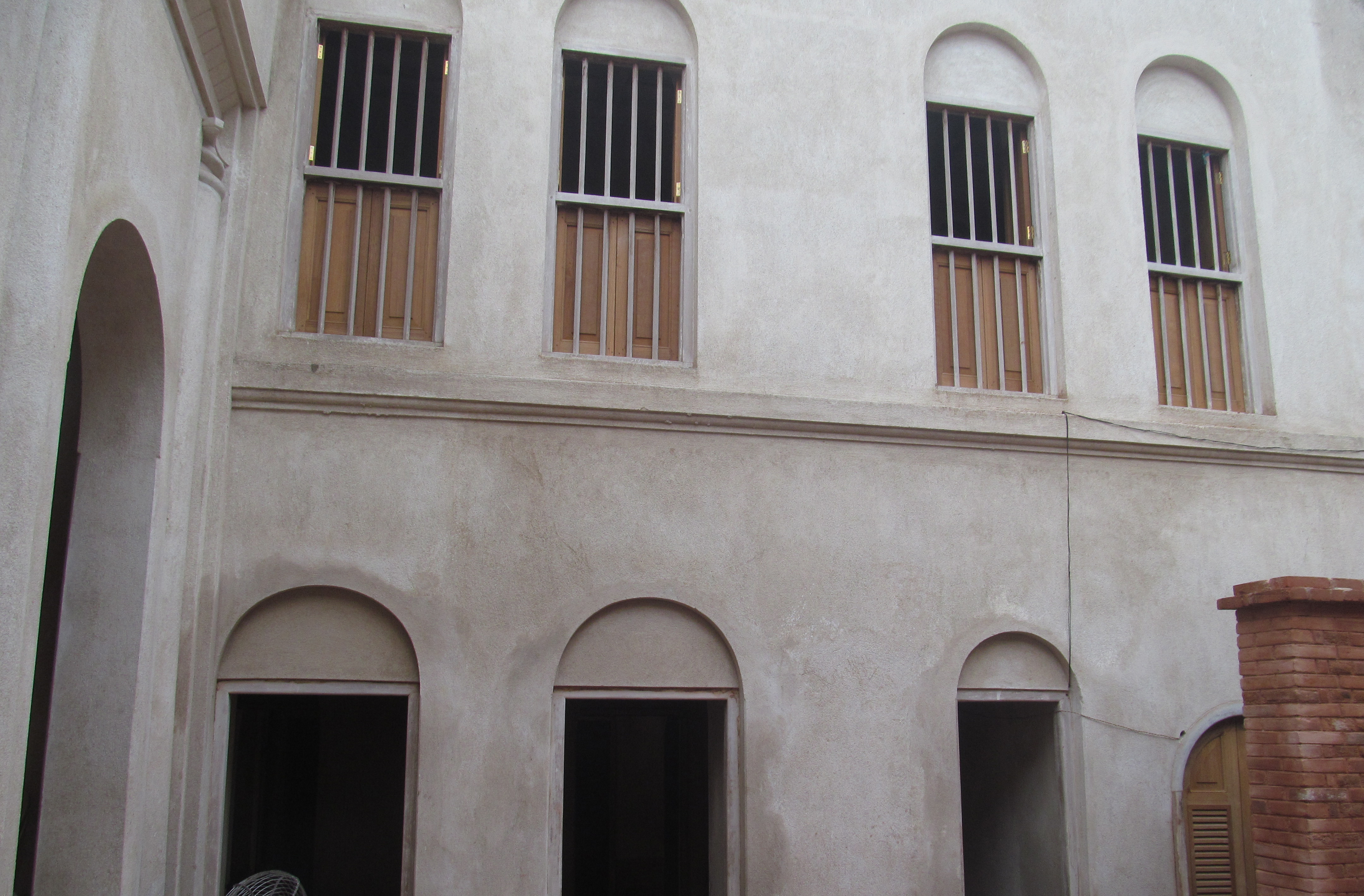
House of Sister Nivedita

- House of Sister Nivedita, Baghbazar
- Shyampukur Bati, Shyampukur, Kolkata
- Ramakrishna Math, Dakshineswar

=== Madhya Pradesh ===
- Ramakrishna Mission Ashrama, Gwalior, M.P.
- Ramakrishna Math, Rewa

==== Educational institutions ====
- Ramakrishna Mission CBSE School, Gwalior, M.P.
- Ramakrishna Mission MPBSE School, Gwalior, M.P.
- Ramakrishna Mission Ashrama, Gwalior, M.P.]
- Sharada Naad Mandir, Ramakrishna Mission Ashrama, Music College, Gwalior, M.P.

==== Medical/Ayurveda Panchakarma institutions ====
- Swami Vivekananda : Ayush Dispensary & Panchakarma Center, RKMA, Gwalior, M.P.

==== Orphanage ====
Sharada Balgram Student Home, RKMA Gwalior, M.P.

==== Dairy Farm ====
- Rakhal Gir Gaushala, RKMA Gwalior, M.P.

=== Chhattisgarh ===
- Ramakrishna Mission Ashrama Narainpur, Chhattisgarh

=== Bihar ===
- Katihar Ramakrishna Mission Vidyamandir, Bihar

=== Jharkhand ===
- Ramakrishna Mission Vidyapith, Deoghar, Jharkhand
- Ramakrishna Mission School, Sidhgora Jamshedpur
- Vivekananda Vidya Mandir, Ranchi

=== Uttar Pradesh ===
==== Educational institutions ====
- Ramakrishna Mission Ashrama, Kanpur, Uttar Pradesh

==== Other institutions ====
- Ramakrishna Mission Home of Service, Varanasi
- Sri Ramakrishna Math, Lucknow
- Vivekananda Polyclinic and Institute of Medical Sciences, Lucknow
- Swami Vivekananda : Ayush Dispensary & Panchakarma Center, RKMA, Gwalior, M.P.

=== Tamil Nadu ===
==== Educational institutions ====
- Ramakrishna Mission Students Home Chennai, Mylapore, Chennai, Tamil Nadu
- Ramakrishna Mission Vivekananda College, Mylapore, Chennai, Tamil Nadu
- Sri Ramakrishna Mission Higher Secondary School, T. Nagar, Chennai
- Sri RKM Sarada Vidyalaya Girls Higher Secondary School, T. Nagar, Chennai
- Ramakrishna Mission Vidyalaya, Coimbatore
- Ramakrishna Vidyalaya Matriculation Higher Secondary School, Villupuram
- Sri Ramakrishna Mission Vidyalaya Polytechnic College, Coimbatore
- Sri Ramakrishna Mission Vidyalaya College of Arts and Science, Coimbatore
- Sri Ramakrishna Mission Vidyalaya College of Education, Coimbatore
- Maruthi college of Physical Education, Coimbatore

==== Other institutions ====
- Sri Ramakrishna Math, Chennai
- Vivekanandar Illam, Chennai
- Vivekananda Rock Memorial, Kanyakumari

=== Kerala ===
==== Educational institutions ====
- Shree Ramakrishna Mission Maharani School, Panniyankara, Kozhikode, Calicut, Kerala

==== Other institutions ====
- Ramakrishna Math, Thrissur

=== Andhra Pradesh ===
==== Educational institutions ====
- Ramakrishna Mission High School, Maharanipeta, Visakhapatnam, Andhra Pradesh
- Ramakrishna Math, Tirupati

=== Karnataka ===
==== Educational institutions ====
- Sri Ramakrishna Vidyarthi Mandiram, Bangalore
- Sri Ramakrishna Vidyashala, Mysore, Karnataka
- Vivekananda Balaka Sangha, Bangalore
- Ramakrishna Institute of Moral & Spiritual Education, Mysore

==== Other institutions ====
- Ramakrishna Math, Ulsoor, Bangalore
- Ramakrishna Math, Basavanagudi, Bangalore
- Sri Ramakrishna Ashram, Yadavagiri, Mysore
- Sri Ramakrishna Math and Mission, Mangaladevi, Mangalore
- Ramakrishna Sharadashram, Ponnampet, Kodagu
- Ramakrishna Mission, Shivanahalli
- Ramakrishna Mission Ashrama, Belagavi
- Ramakrishna Mission, Davangere
- Ramakrishna Math, Madihalli

=== Arunachal Pradesh ===
==== Educational institutions ====
- Ramakrishna Mission School, Viveknagar, Along, Dist.: West Siang, Arunachal Pradesh
- Ramakrishna Mission School, Narottamnagar
- Ramakrishna Mission School, Lumdung, Seppa 790102, Arunachal Pradesh,

==== Other institutions ====
- Ramakrishna Mission Hospital, Ganga, Itanagar

=== Tripura ===
- Ramakrishna Mahavidyalaya, Kailasahar, Tripura
- Ramakrishna Mission Vidyalaya, Viveknagar, Agartala

=== Uttarakhand ===
- Advaita Ashrama, Dist. Champawat, Uttarakhand
- Ramakrishna Mission Sevashrama, Kankhal, Haridwar, Uttarakhand

=== Odisha ===
- Ramakrishna Math and Mission, Bhubaneswar, Bhubaneswar, Odisha
- Ramakrishna Mission Ashrama School, Hatamuniguda, Rayagada, Odisha

=== Rajasthan ===
- Ramakrishna Mission, Khetri, Jhunjhunu

=== Delhi ===
- Ramakrishna Mission, Delhi

=== Maharashtra ===
- Ramakrishna Math, Pune
- Ramakrishna Math, Khar
- Ramakrishna Math, Aurangabad
- Ramakrishna Math, Nagpur
- Ramakrishna Mission Ashram, Sakwar

=== Telangana ===
- Ramakrishna Math, Domalguda, Hyderabad

== Bangladesh ==
=== Religious Institutions ===
- Ramakrishna Math and Ramakrishna Mission, Dhaka

=== Other institutions ===
- Ramakrishna Sevashram Chittagong.
- Ramakrishna Math, Barisal.
- Ramakrishna Math, Sylhet.

== Sri Lanka ==
- R. K. M. Sri Koneswara Hindu College
- Kokuvil Ramakrishna M.V, Sri Lanka
- Kondavil Hindu Maha Vidyalayam, Sri Lanka
- Kondavil Ramakrishna Vidyalayam, Sri Lanka

== United States ==
- Ramakrishna-Vivekananda Center, New York
- Vedanta Society of New York
- Vedanta Society of Providence, Providence, Rhode Island
- Vivekananda Vedanta Society of Chicago, Illinois
- Vedanta Society of Connecticut, Canton, Connecticut,
- Vedanta Society of Southern California, Los Angeles, California
- Ramakrishna Vedanta Society, Boston
- Vedanta Center of St. Petersburg, Florida

== Singapore ==
- Ramakrishna Mission, Singapore

== Germany ==
- Vedanta gesellschaft, Berlin

== Gallery ==
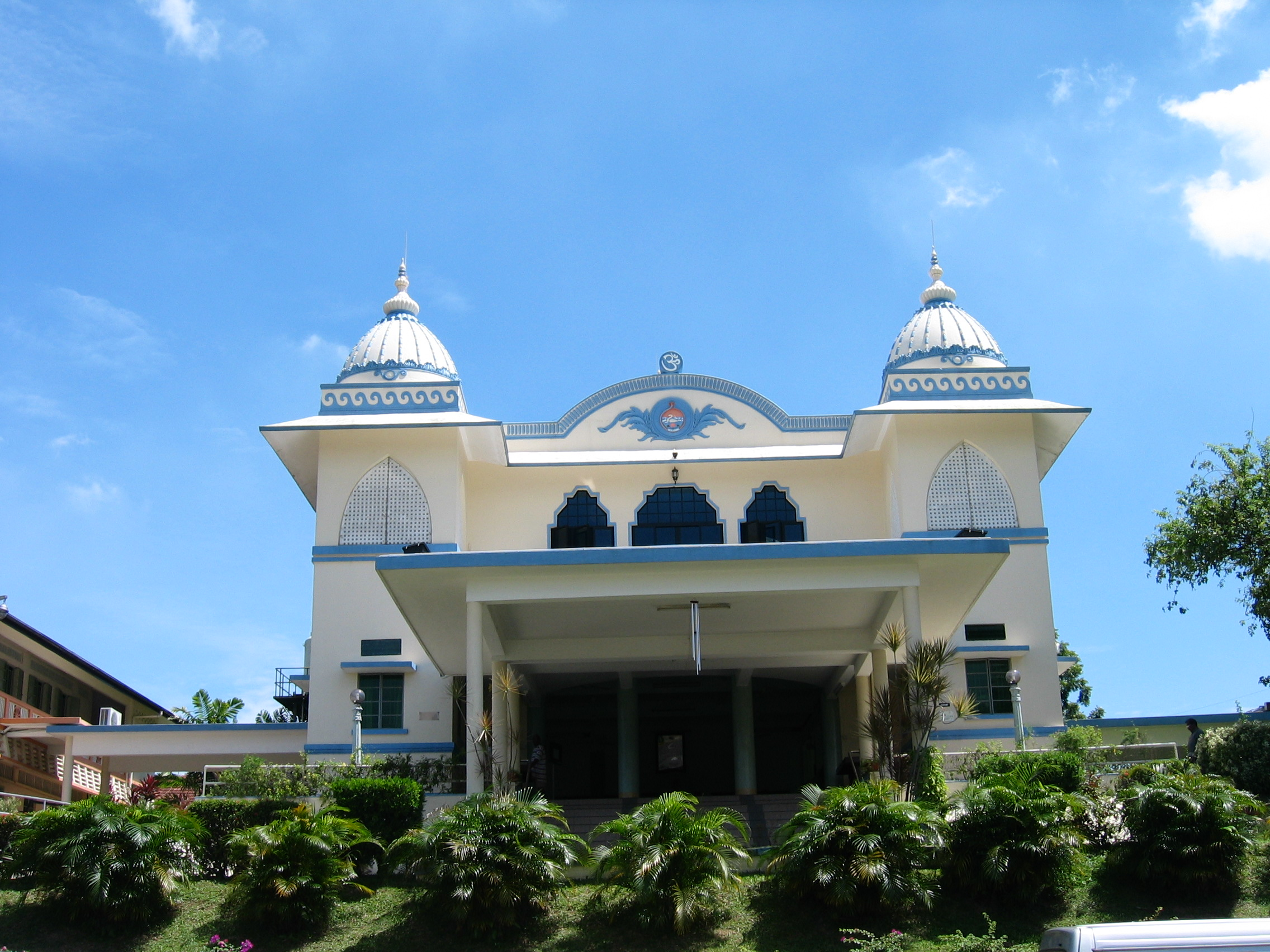
Ramakrishna Mission, Singapore

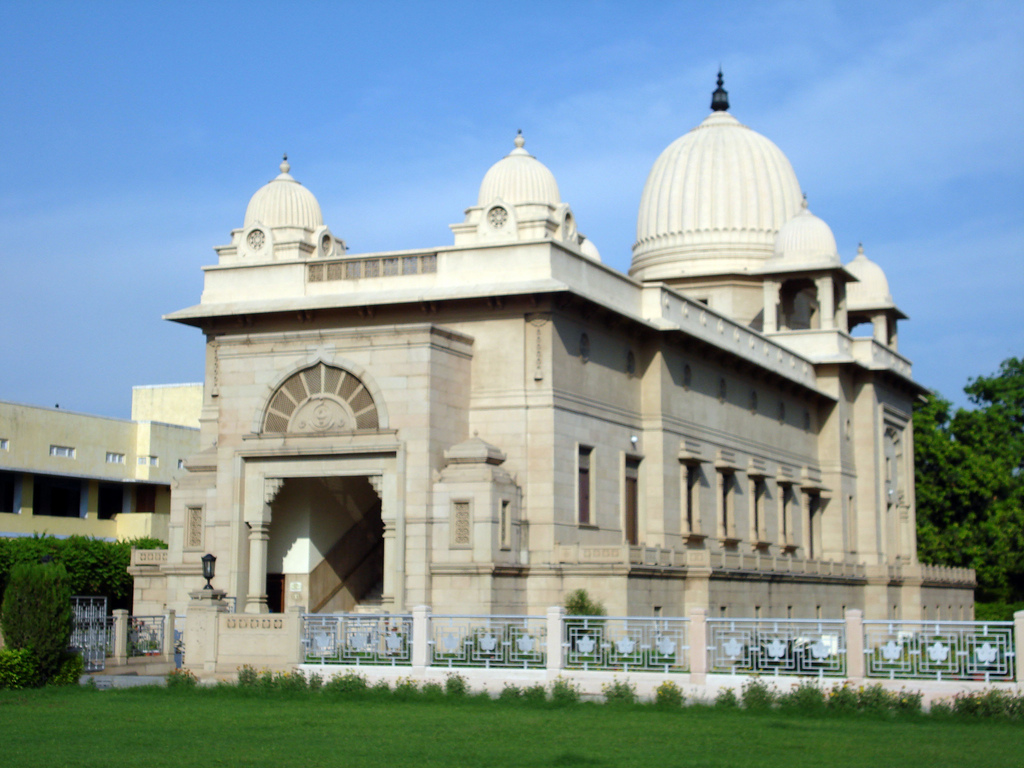
RKM Math & Mission, Delhi

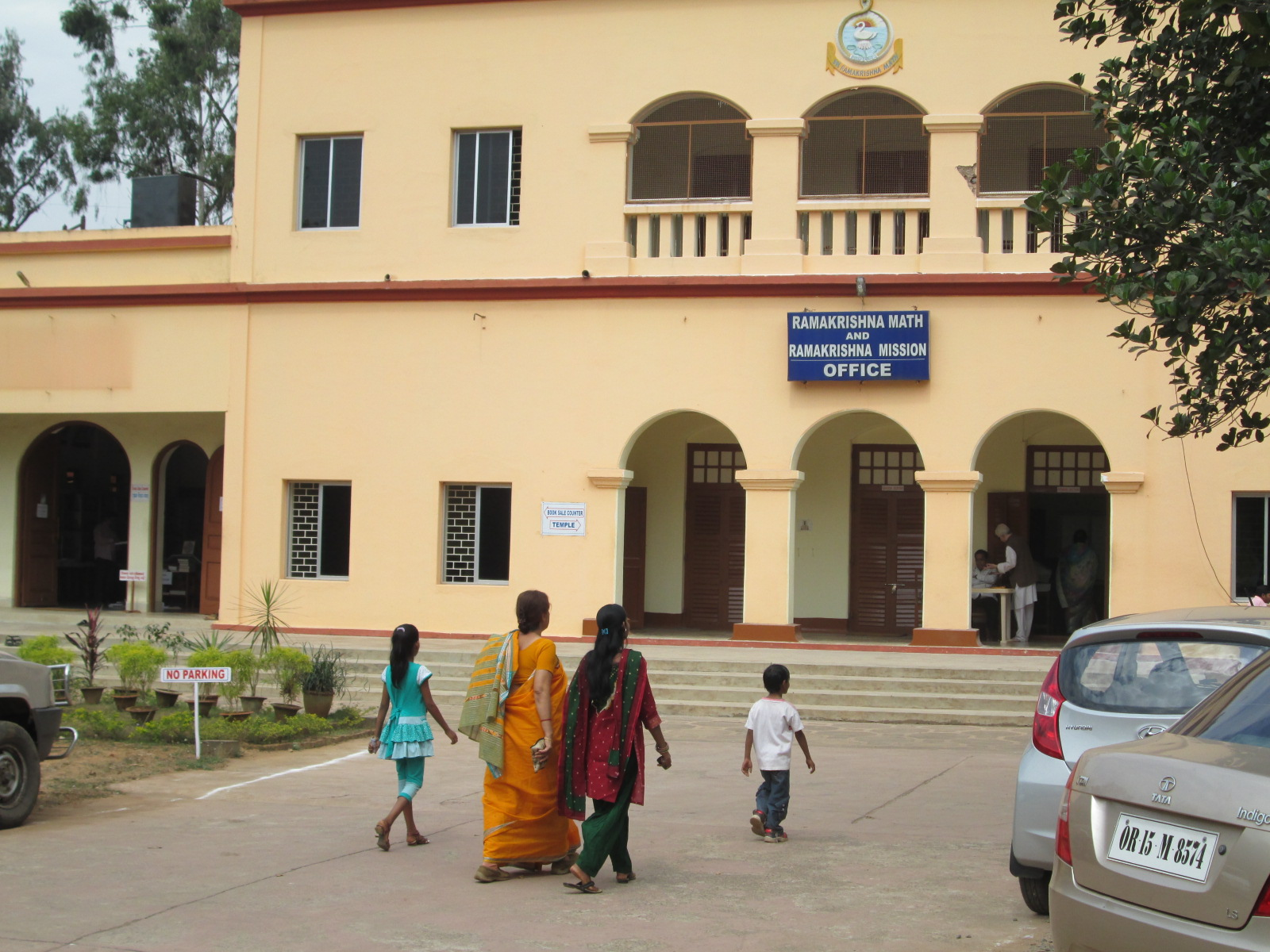
Ramakrishna Math, Bhubaneswar

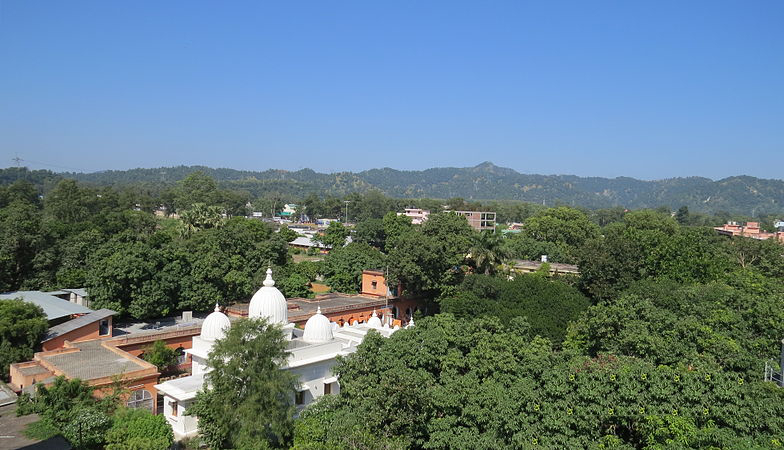
RKM Sevashrama, Kankha

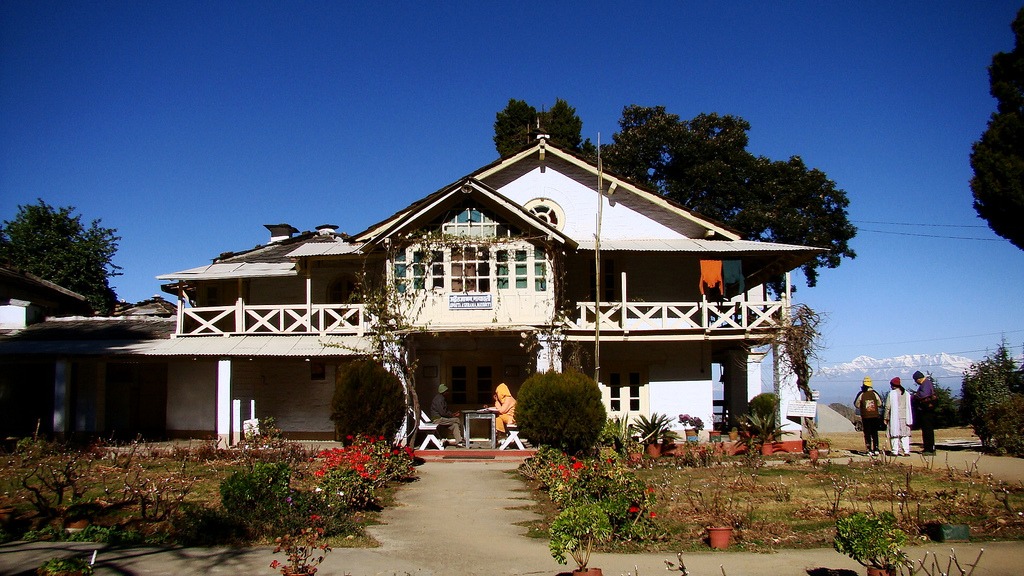
Advaita Ashrama

Viveknagar Ramakrishna Mission Vidyalaya

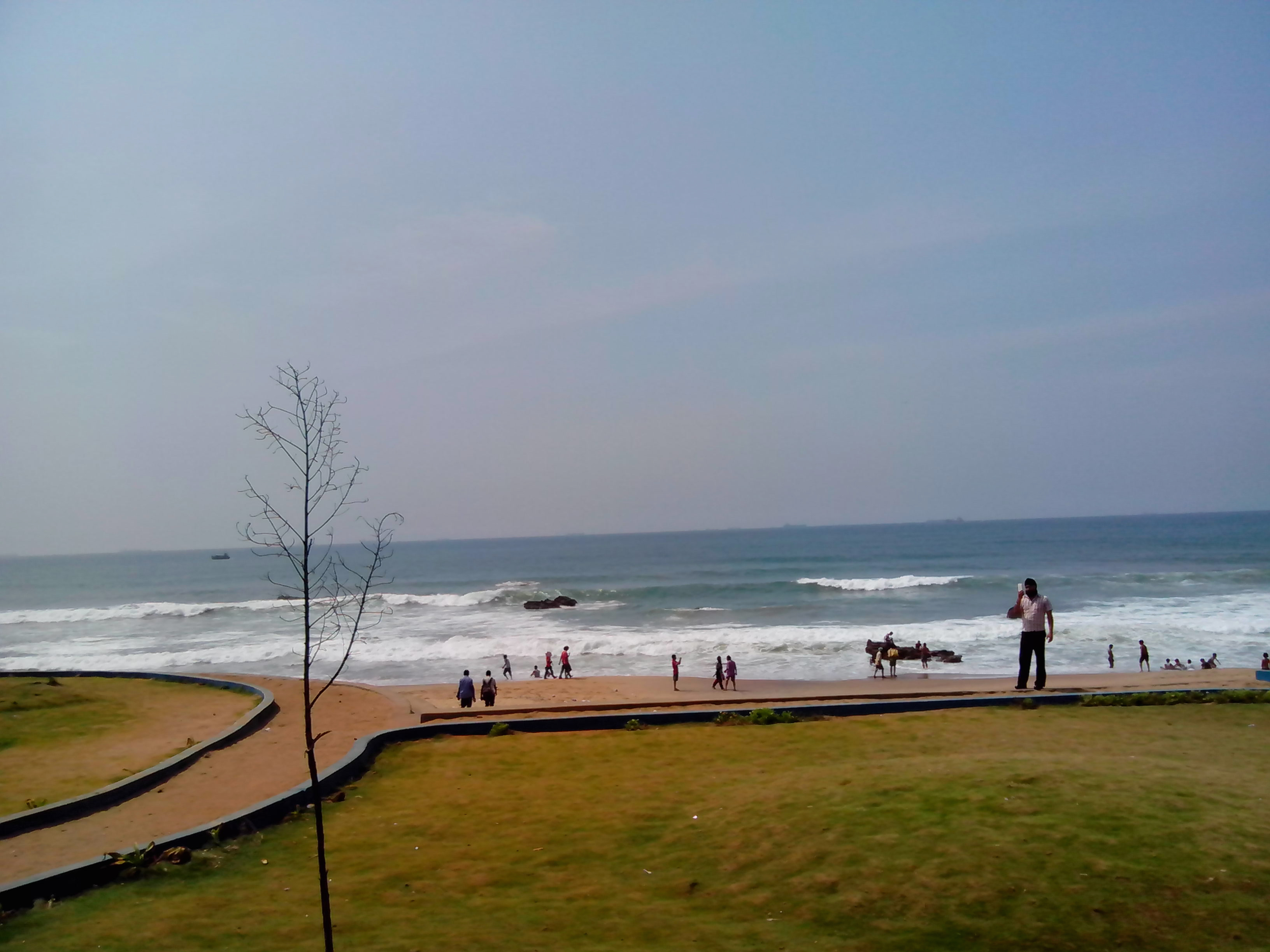
Ramakrishna Mission Beach

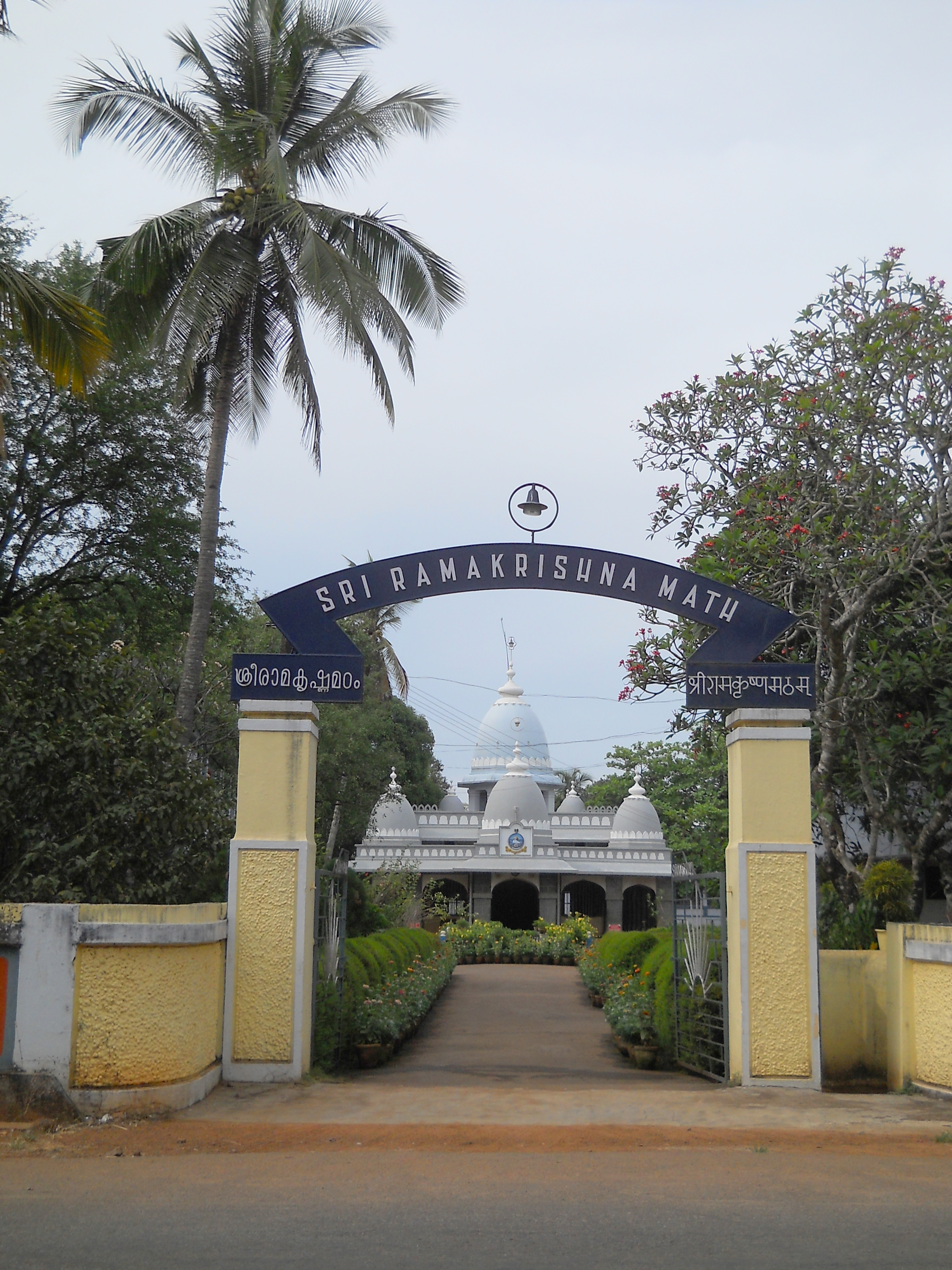
Thrissur Ramakrishna Math

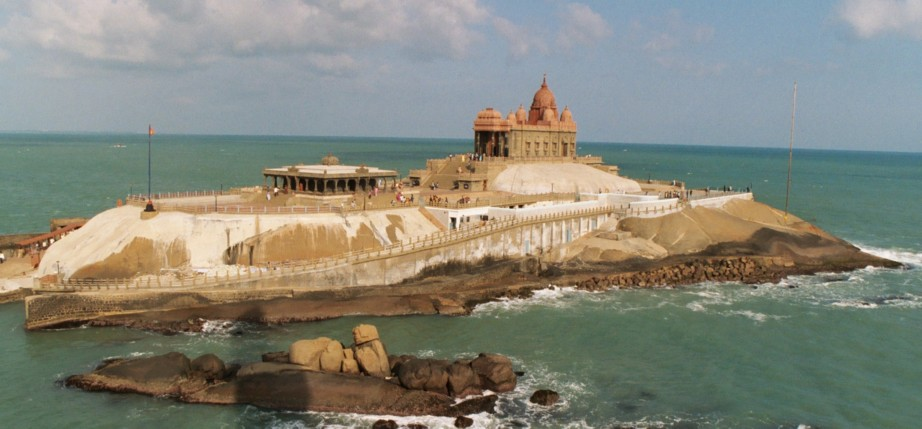
Vivekananda Rock Memorial

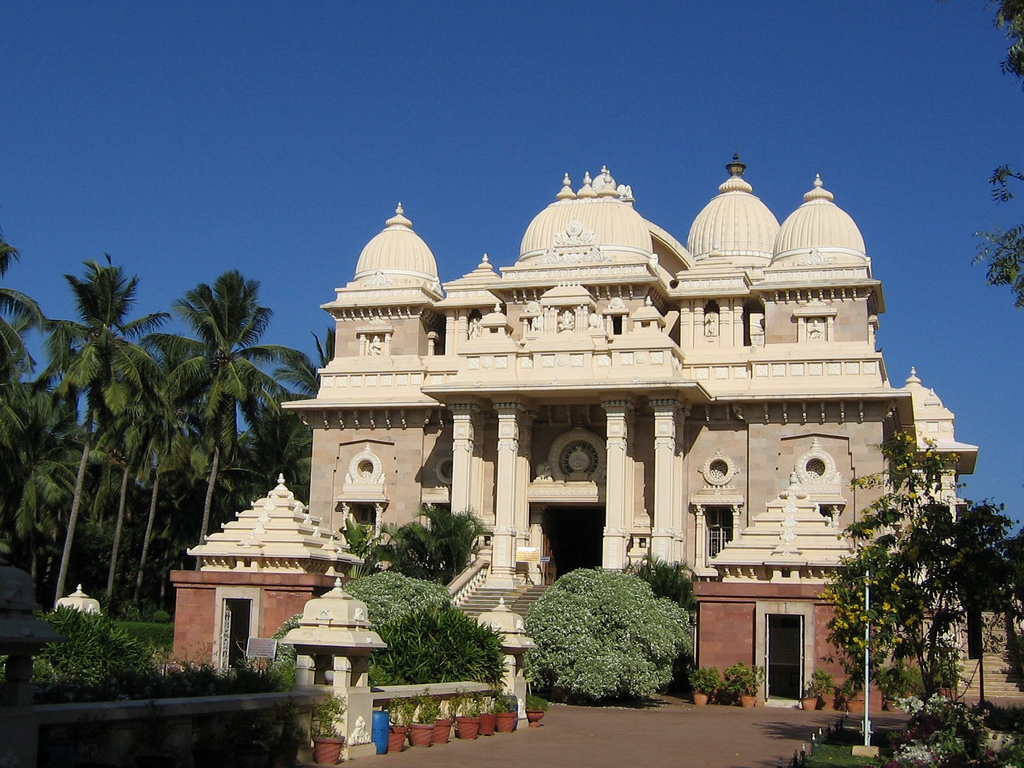
Ramakrishna Math, Chennai

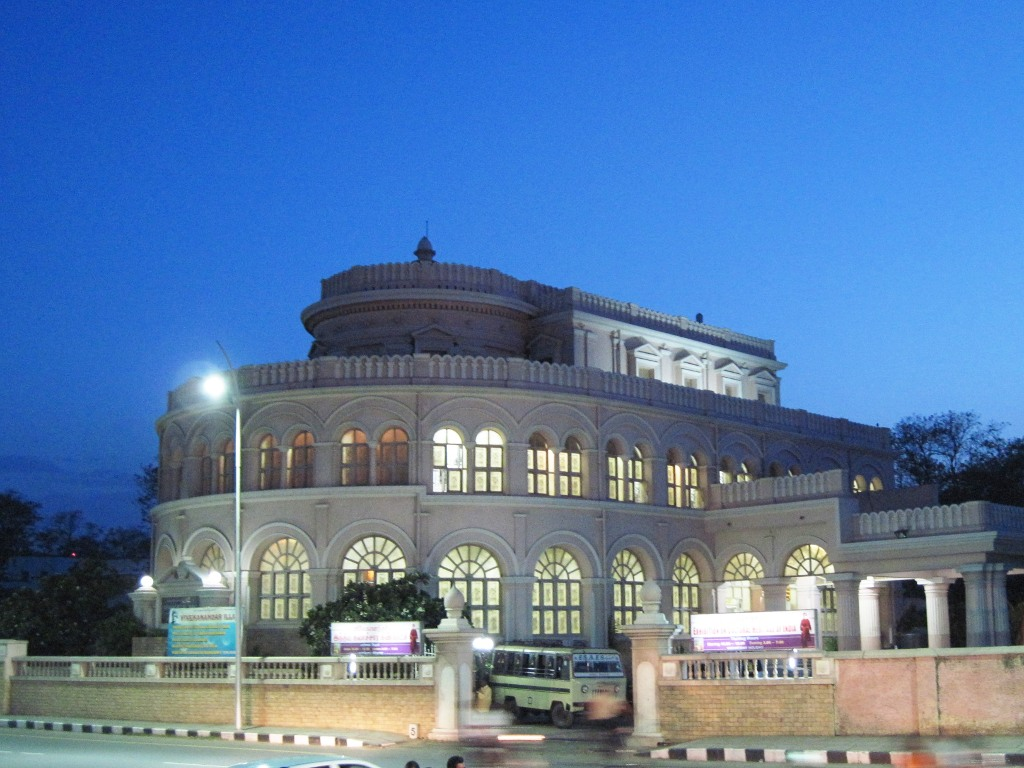
Vivekanandar Illam

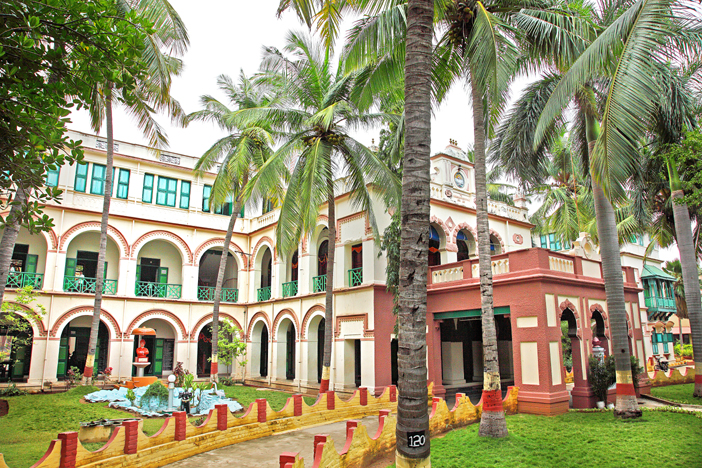
RKM Students' Home, Mylapore

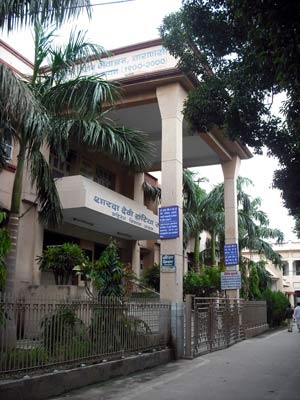
RKM Home of Service
