= Ramakrishna Mission Siksha Mandir, Sarisha =

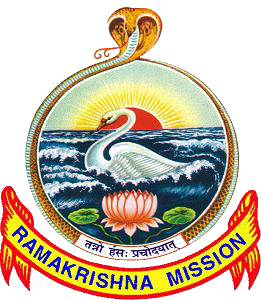
- Motto: Atmano mokshartham jagat hitaya cha (For one’s own salvation and for the welfare of the world)
- Type: Semi-residential Bengali Medium Higher secondary school
- Established: 1923
- Students: 1113
- Location: Sarisha, Diamond Harbour, South 24 Parganas, near Kolkata, India; 22.243982°N 88.183437°E
- Affiliations: West Bengal Board of Secondary Education

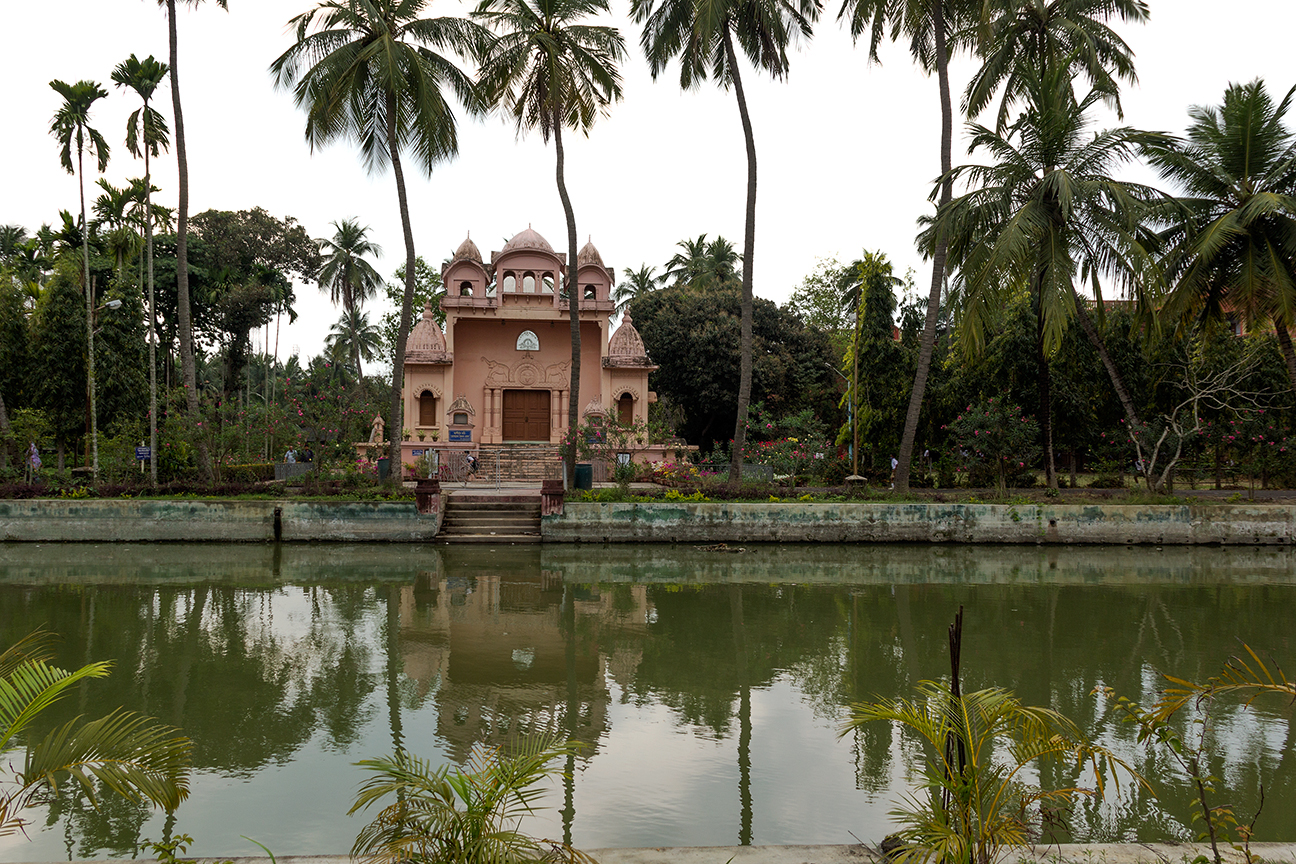
The Ramakrishna Mission

The Ramakrishna Mission Siksha Mandir, Sarisha or Sarisha Ramakrishna Mission Siksha Mandir is a semi-residential Bengali Medium, premium higher secondary school in Sarisha, in South 24 Parganas near Kolkata, India. It was established in 1921. It is affiliated with the West Bengal Board of Secondary Education.

== Notable alumni ==
- Prabhat Roy, Filmmaker

== See also ==
- List of Ramakrishna Mission institutions
