= Ramakrishna Mission School, Sidhgora Jamshedpur =

Ramakrishna Mission School Sidhgora
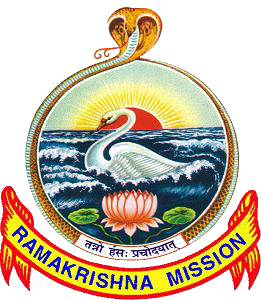
- Emblem

Location
- Jamshedpur, Jharkhand; India; 22.801869°N 86.232017°E

Information
- Type: Educational, Philanthropic, Religious Studies, Spirituality
- Motto: Atmano mokshartham jagat hitaya cha (आत्मनो मोक्षार्थं जगद्धिताय च) (For one’s own salvation and for the welfare of the world)
- Established: 1977
- Principal: Apurba Das
- Gender: Co-education
- Campus: Jamshedpur
- Affiliation: ICSE

Ramakrishna Mission School, Sidhgora of Jamshedpur was established in 1977, by the Ramakrishna Mission Society, a spiritual and humanitarian body founded by the followers of Sri Ramakrishna Paramahamsa (1836–1886), a 19th-century saint. The Mission Objectives was to preach those truths which Sri Ramakrishna, has, for the good of humanity, preached and demonstrated by practical application in his own life, and to help others to put these truths into practice in their lives for their temporal, mental, and spiritual advancement.

The Mission has established many schools and colleges in India in which young men and women belonging to every social status, community and linguistic group, are educated through the medium of English and other regional languages. These institutions are a part of the Mission efforts to share in the country's educational undertakings.

Ramakrishna Mission School has for its inspiration and guidance, the life and teachings of Ramakrishna Paramahamsa. Special attention is paid to faith formation of the students, through weekly classes. Even so, the school's student profile is very cosmopolitan.

The School is owned and run by Ramakrishna Mission. The responsibility of the day-to-day running of the school is vested in the Principal, currently Mr. Apurba Das.

It is a co-ed and permanently affiliated to the Indian Certificate of Secondary Education (ICSE). Admission to its Secondary Section is restricted to standard VI alone. Initially Hindi and Bengali Medium were also a part of the school, but now they have been abolished. When the school was founded it had been affiliated to Central Board of Secondary Education(CBSE), but in 2001 the affiliation was changed to ICSE. The 2002 Batch was the first batch of ICSE student from this school. In January 2004, a new building was inaugurated by East Singhbhum superintendent of Police.

== Location ==
The school is located near the Sidhgora Market. It is about 50 metres from the Main Road.

== Emblem of Ramakrishna Mission ==
Designed and explained by Swami Vivekananda given in his own words: The wavy waters in the picture are symbolic of Karma; the lotus, of Bhakti; and the rising-sun, of Jnana. The encircling serpent is indicative of Yoga and the awakened Kundalini Shakti, while the swan in the picture stands for Paramatman (Supreme Self). Therefore, the idea of the picture is that by the union of Karma, Jnana, Bhakti and Yoga, the vision of Paramatman is obtained.

== Vasanti Durga Mahotsav ==
Children of Ramakrishna Mission celebrate annually the Vasanti Durga Mahotsav on its premises in Sidhgora. Apart from religious discourses, kirtan, bhog and arti are also organised.

== The Morning Prayer ==
For Unity of Faiths: May He Who is the Father in Heaven of the Christians, Holy One of the Jews, Allah of the Muhammadans, Buddha of the Buddhists, Tao of the Chinese, Ahura Mazda of the Zoroastrians and Brahman of the Hindus lead us from the unreal to the Real, from darkness to light, from disease and death to immortality. May the All-Loving Being manifest Himself unto us, and grant us abiding understanding and all-consuming divine love. Peace, Peace. Peace be unto all.

== See also ==
- Education in India
- Literacy in India
- List of schools in India
