= Asansol Ramakrishna Mission High School =

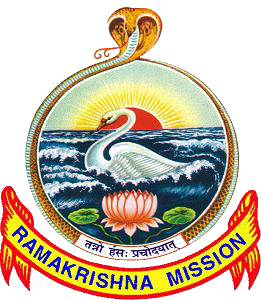

Location
- Kanyapur Road; Asansol, West Bengal, 713305; India
- Coordinates: 23.711528°N 86.950176°E

Information
- Type: School
- Motto: Atmano mokshartham jagat hitaya cha (For one's own salvation and for the welfare of the world)
- Religious affiliation: Hindu
- Established: 1939
- School board: West Bengal Board of Secondary Education
- Oversight: Ramakrishna Mission Ashrama, Asansol
- Grades: I–X
- Gender: Boys
- Language: Bengali
- Website: rkmasansolhs.in

Asansol Ramakrishna Mission High School is a Bengali-medium school for boys in Asansol, West Bengal, India. It was established in 1939 and is part of the Ramakrishna Mission Ashrama, Asansol; a branch of Ramakrishna Mission. It is affiliated to the West Bengal Board of Secondary Education.

== History ==
In 1926, few devotees, inspired by Swami Vivekananda's ideology established a Ramakrishna mission in Asansol, presently at Paschim Bardhaman district, in the Indian state of West Bengal. Belur Math took it over as one of its branches in 1939 and it was renamed as Ramakrishna Mission Ashrama, Asansol. Initially the Mission's activities were on a small scale with only an orphanage and a school for girls. Later a boys' school was started which was upgraded to a High School in 1944.
