= Ramakrishna Stadium =

Multi-purpose stadium in Narendrapur, India

Ramakrishna Mission Stadium
- Interactive map of Ramakrishna Mission Stadium
- Full name: Ramakrishna Mission Stadium
- Location: Narendrapur, South 24 Parganas district, Bengal
- Coordinates: 22.432542°N 88.403249°E
- Owner: Ramakrishna Mission
- Operator: Ramakrishna Mission
- Capacity: 5,000

Construction
- Groundbreaking: 1997
- Opened: 1997

Website
- cricketarchive

Ramakrishna Stadium is a multi-purpose stadium in Narendrapur, South 24 Parganas district. The ground is mainly used for organizing matches of football, cricket, and other sports. The ground has floodlights so that the stadium can host day-night matches. It complies with all norms of BCCI so that Ranji Trophy matches can be played there. The stadium was established in 1998 when they hosted a match of Vijay Hazare Trophy between Central Zone Under-16s and North Zone Under-16s but since then the stadium has not hosted any senior cricket matches.
