= Ramakrishna Mission Students Home Chennai =

R.K Mission

Ramakrishna Mission Students Home
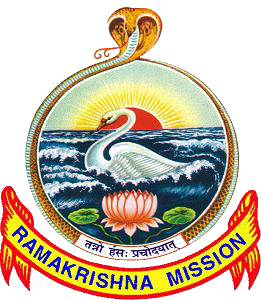
- Emblem
- Abbreviation: RKMH
- Formation: 17 February 1905; 121 years ago Chennai, British India
- Founder: C.Ramasami Ayyangar
- Type: Educational organisation
- Purpose: Education
- Headquarters: Belur Math, West Bengal, India
- Location: Chennai
- Coordinates: 13.05°N 80.26°E
- Region served: Chennai
- Secretary: Swami Satyajnanananda
- Affiliations: Ramakrishna Mission
- Website: Official website

Ramakrishna Mission Students Home is a residential and day school and polytechnic for poor, destitute and orphan boys. It is located on Sir P.S.Sivaswamy Salai (Road) in Mylapore, Chennai.

== History ==
The Home was started on 17 February 1905 by Sri C.Ramasami Ayyangar with the blessings of Swami Ramakrishnananda, a direct disciple of Ramakrishna with 7 orphan boys. The Home began operating out of a small building in Mylapore, given free of rent by Dr. M.C.Nanjunda Rao who was a disciple of Vivekananda.

In 1916, Sri S.G.Srinivasachariar donated a piece of land and the adjoining piece of land was acquired. The total area is about 1.4 acres (26 grounds). The foundation of a new building was laid on 6 May 1917 and the building was on 10 May 1921 which happened to be the Akshaya Tritiya day that year.

The Home started offering vocational training for students in the year 1932 with a Licenciate in Automobile Engineering (LAE) course.

The Home operations was temporarily shifted to Athur near Chengalpattu in 1942 during the second world war and was moved back to Mylapore in 1958. The Home is formally affiliated to the Ramakrishna Mission, Belur Math.

== Courses Offered ==
The Home runs a primary school, high school and a polytechnic (offering diploma courses in Mechanical Engineering, Automobile Engineering and Computer Engineering). It is modeled on the Gurukula system of education.

== See also ==
- Ramakrishna Mission
