= Ramakrishna Mission Sevashrama, Sargachi =

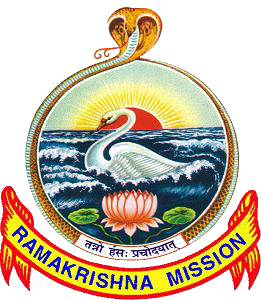
- Emblem
- Coordinates: 24.023033°N 88.251128°E
- Website: rkmsargachi.org

Ramakrishna Mission Sevashrama Sargachi is located in Murshidabad district of West Bengal. It was founded by Swami Akhandananda, a direct disciple of Sri Ramakrishna in August, 1897. It is a spiritual and philanthropic centre under Belur Math, the headquarters of Ramakrishna Order. It started with an orphanage and later undertook many activities in the fields of education, treatment of poor, training and development, agriculture and overall development of a very poor and backward area of West Bengal. All of these activities are undertaken as spiritual practices.

== Genesis ==
Swami Akhandananda or Gangadhar Maharaj, as he was popularly called, was an avid traveler and philanthropist. He went to Tibet several times on foot, and also other regions of Himalayas. He went to Gujarat, Rajputana and various other parts of North India as itinerant monk and returned to the Alambazar Math, the then headquarters of Ramakrishna Order, in 1895. he then traveled to Baharampur in the district of Murshidabad, a very poor and backward area where he encountered a major famine and saw people suffering from want of basic necessities like food. He started famine relief at Mahula village with the help of the newly established Ramakrishna Mission and with active help and encourage from Swami Vivekananda and Swami Brahmananda In the course of the famine relief, Swami Akhandananda took two young orphans and with them and several others, started an orphanage at Mahula. Subsequently, the orphanage was moved to Sargachi village. Since its inception, the organization under Swami Akhandananda, who stayed there permanently even after becoming the president of Belur Math, developed schools, started industrial training programs, medical camps and hospital services for poor and other philanthropic programs beneficial for the society. One of the staunch patrons of the ashrama was Maharaja Manindra Chandra Nandi of Kashimbazar.
