= Ramakrishna Math, Ulsoor =

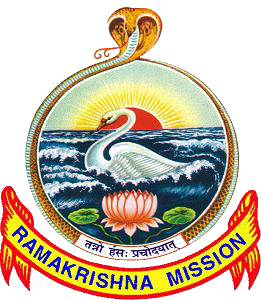
- Emblem
- Headquarters: Ulsoor, Karnataka, India
- Coordinates: 12°58′49.12″N 77°37′38.30″E
- Website: ramakrishnamath.in

Ramakrishna Math, Ulsoor is a branch of Ramakrishna Math and Ramakrishna Mission located at Ulsoor, Bangalore, India. Other than Ulsoor, there is another Ramakrishna Mission branch in Bangalore located at Bull Temple Road.

== History ==
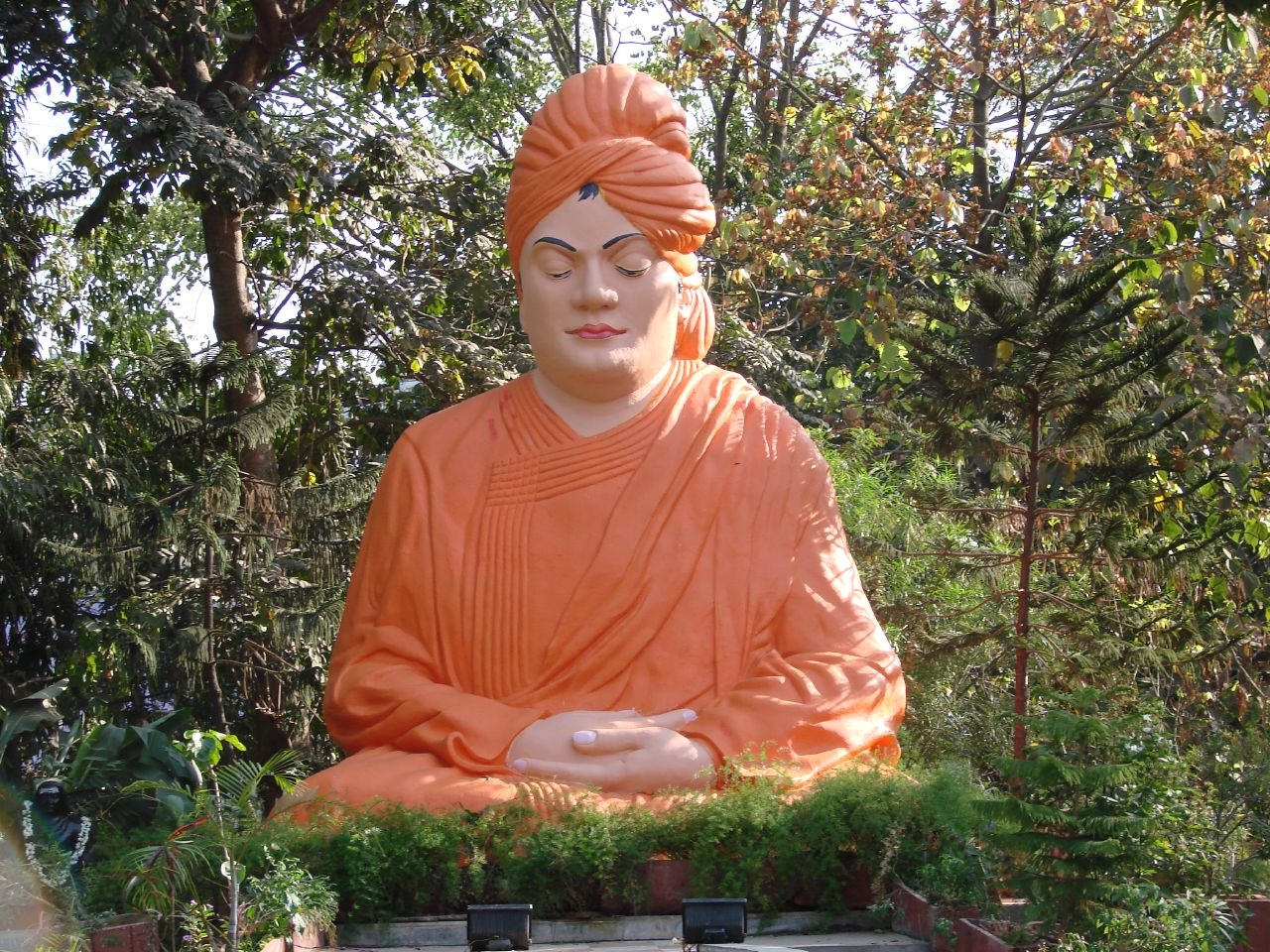
Swami Vivekananda statue at the centre

In 1906 a handful of Ramakrishna disciples took an accommodation in Ulsoor in lease for daily meetings and spiritual and religious practices. On 5 May 1906 Swami Vimalananda declared to convert the place into an Ashram, and installed the pictures of Ramakrishna, Sarada Devi, and Swami Vivekananda there. On 17 November 1907 the Ashrama was formally inaugurated. At that time it was named Vivekananda Ashrama.

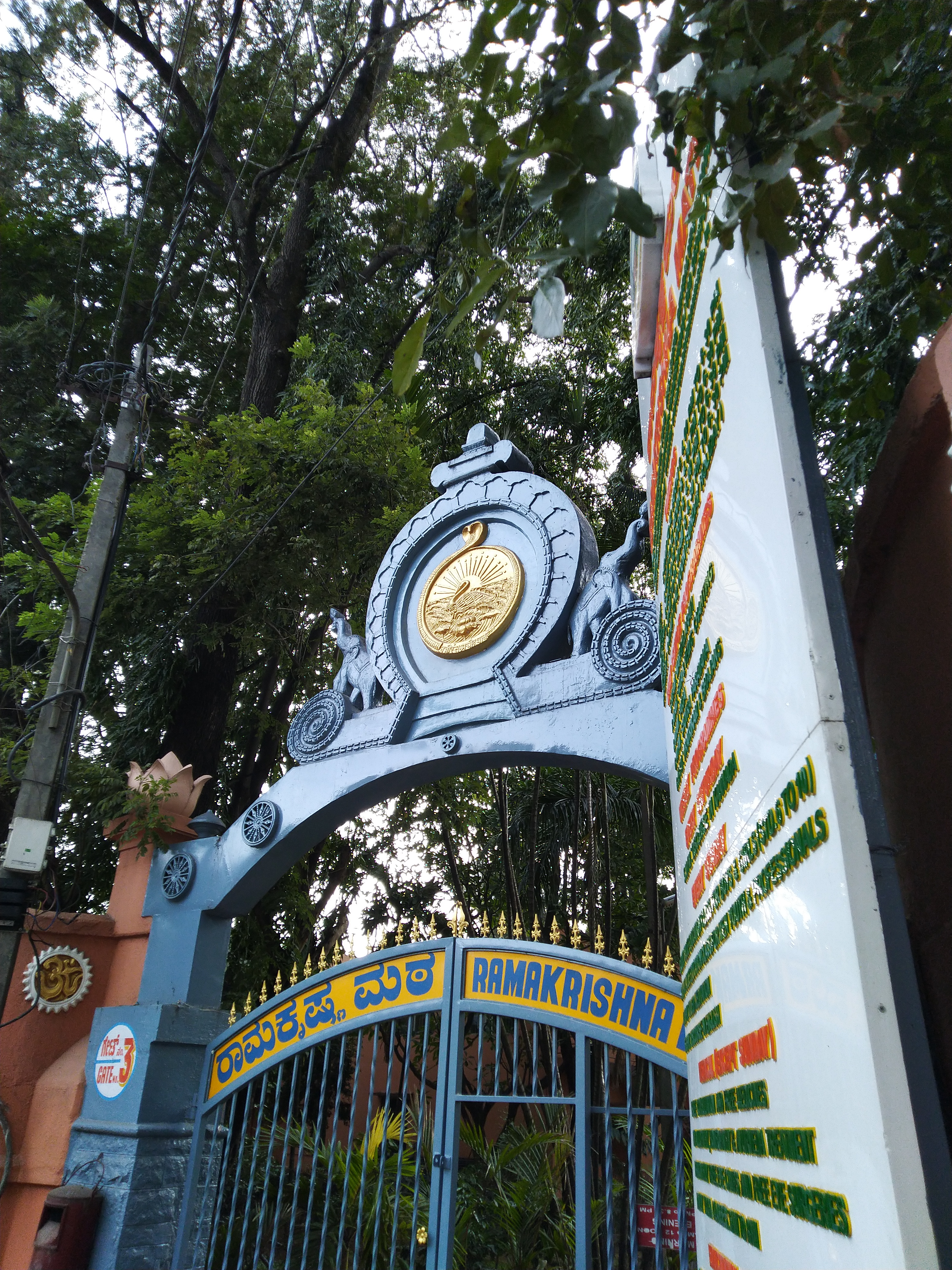
Ramakrishna Math, Ulsoor entrance

In 1944 the Ashrama was affiliated by Ramakrishna Math and Mission. On 1 January 1999, it became an independent Ramakrishna Math and Mission branch.

== Services ==
The centre houses a memorial shrine, a book-store, and a charitable dispensary. Other than daily worships, all significant Indian religious events are observed here. The centre also conducts monthly Satsang. The charitable dispensary was planned in 2004.
