= Ramakrishna Math and Mission, Bhubaneswar =

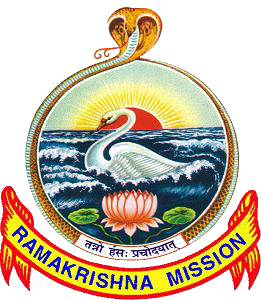
- Emblem
- Type: Religious organisation
- Headquarters: Belur Math, West Bengal, India
- Location: Bhubaneswar
- Coordinates: 20.248755°N 85.836198°E
- Affiliations: Neo-Vedanta
- Website: rkmbbsr.org

Ramakrishna Math and Mission, Bhubaneswar is a monastic organization for men brought into existence by Ramakrishna (1836–1886), a 19th-century saint of Bengal. The motto of the Ramakrishna Math and Ramakrishna Mission is: "For one's salvation, and the welfare of the world". Sri Ramakrishna Math, Bhubaneswar is the first branch center of the Ramakrishna Order in Odisha. It was started in the year 1919 by Swami Brahmananda, one of the direct disciples of Ramakrishna. Besides Swami Brahmananda, Math was visited by Swami Shivananda, Swami Premananda, Swami Niranjanananda, and Swami Vijnanananda.

== History ==
Swami Brahmananda a direct disciple of Ramakrishna inaugurated the math on 31 October 1919. Brahmananda used to visit Bhubaneswar often and liked its spiritual atmosphere. The Math centre was founded by Swami Brahmananda (a monastic disciple of Sri Ramakrishna) in 1919. The Mission centre was founded in 1920.

== Activities of the Math centre ==
The main activities of Math include Daily worship, regular religious classes, and discourses in and outside the Ashrama. Major festivals include a celebration of Kali Puja and the birthdays of some prophets and saints. It also houses a publication department which publishes books in Oriya.

== Activities of the Mission centre ==
The Mission provides services in education and healthcare: a high school with 354 boys and 247 girls, a free students’ home for 60 tribal boys a charitable allopathic dispensary, which treated 15,855 cases, a rural mobile medical unit which treated 5627 cases, a library and a free reading room with 26,904 books and 99 periodicals and newspapers.

== Photo gallery ==
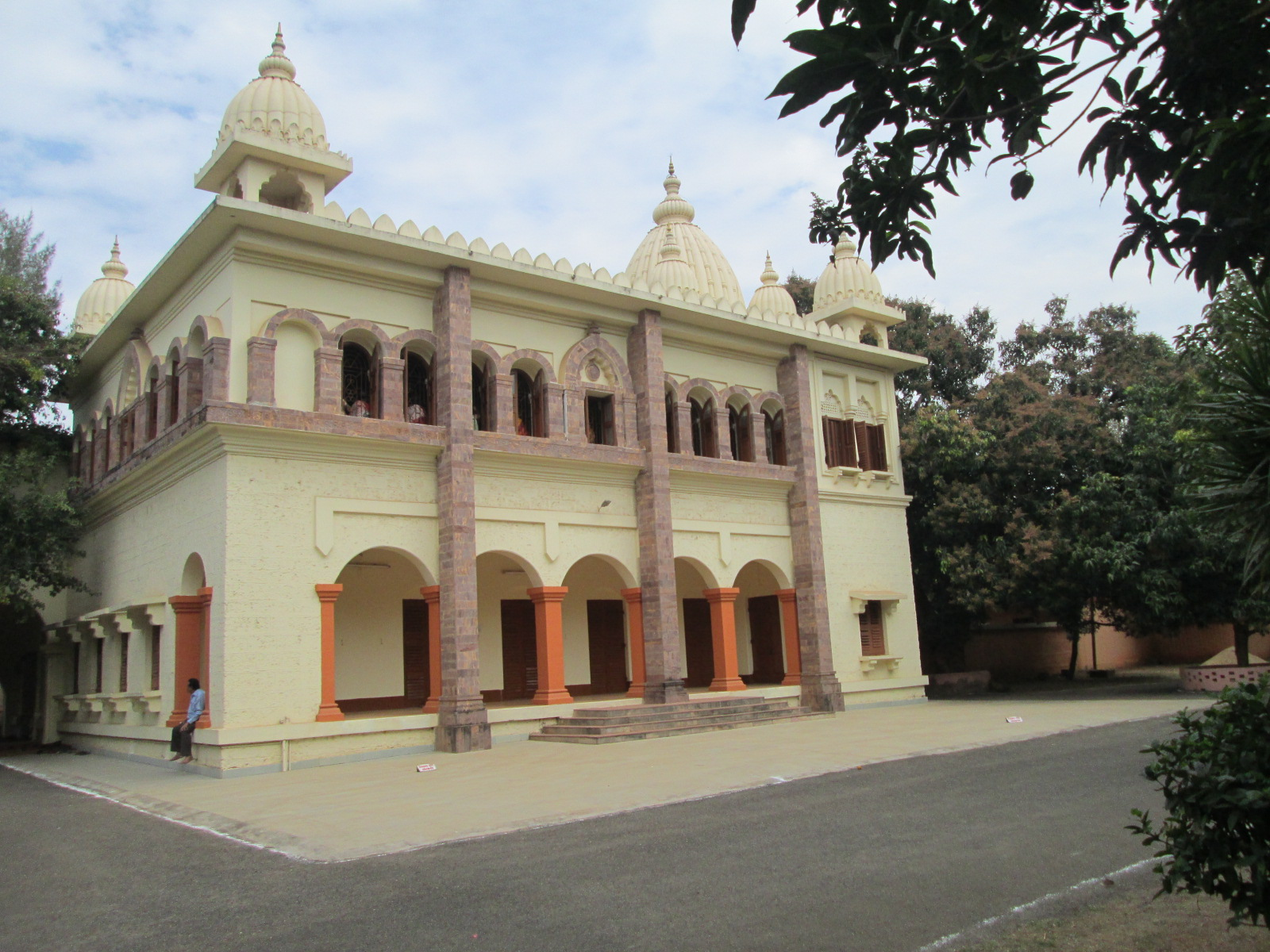
Universal Temple of Sri Ramakrishna

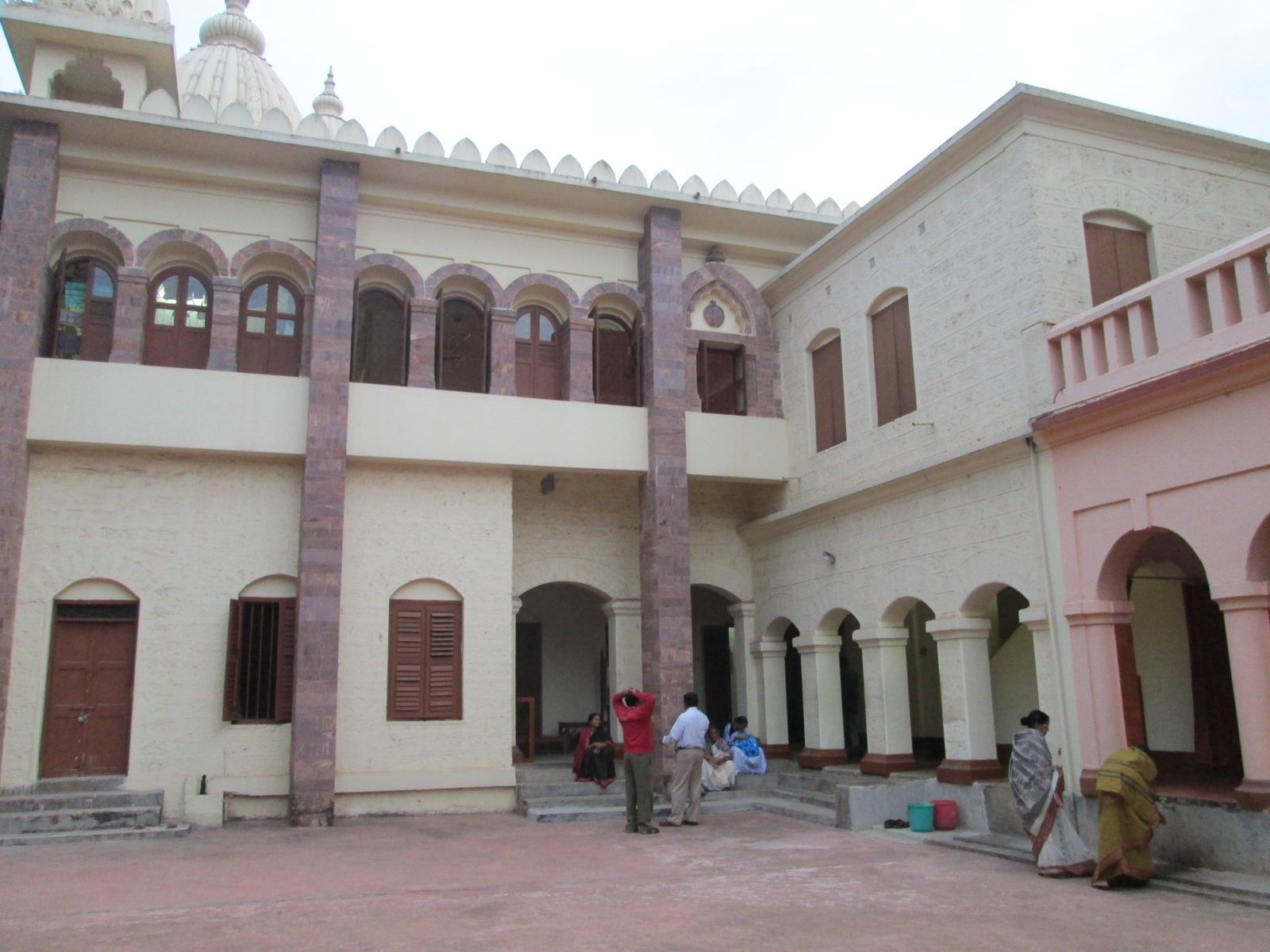
Math complex

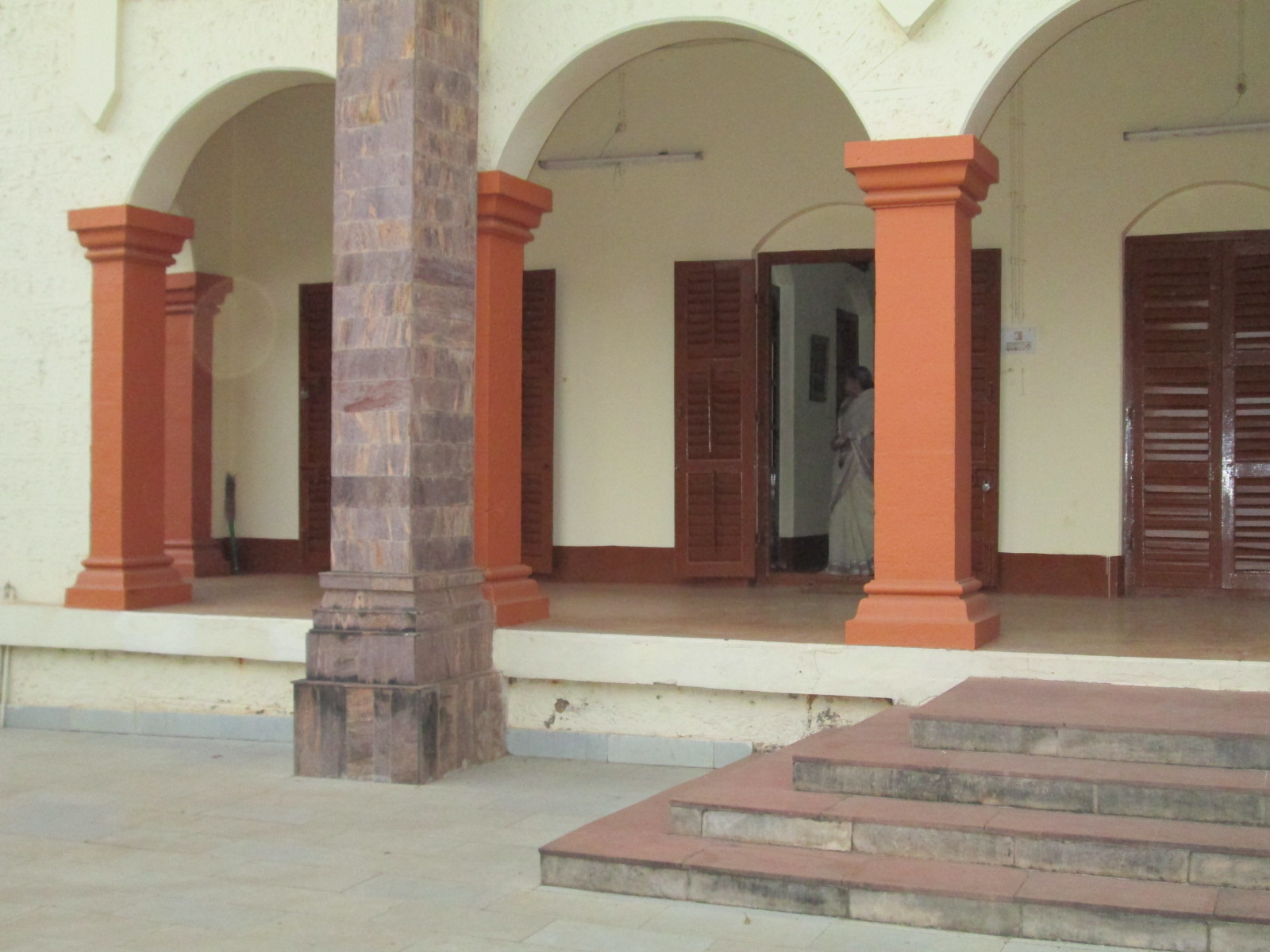
Swami Brahmananda's room

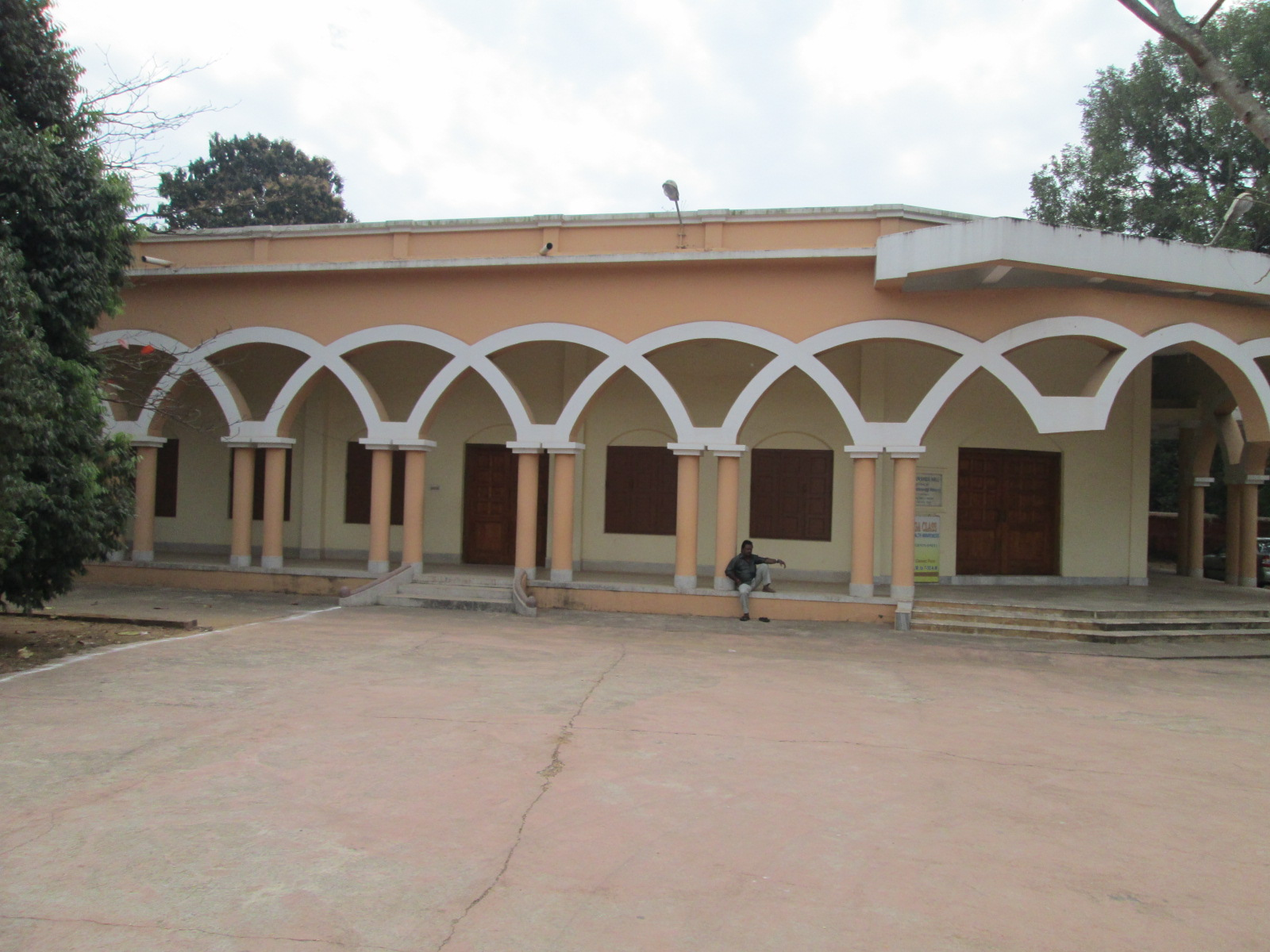
Vivekananda hall

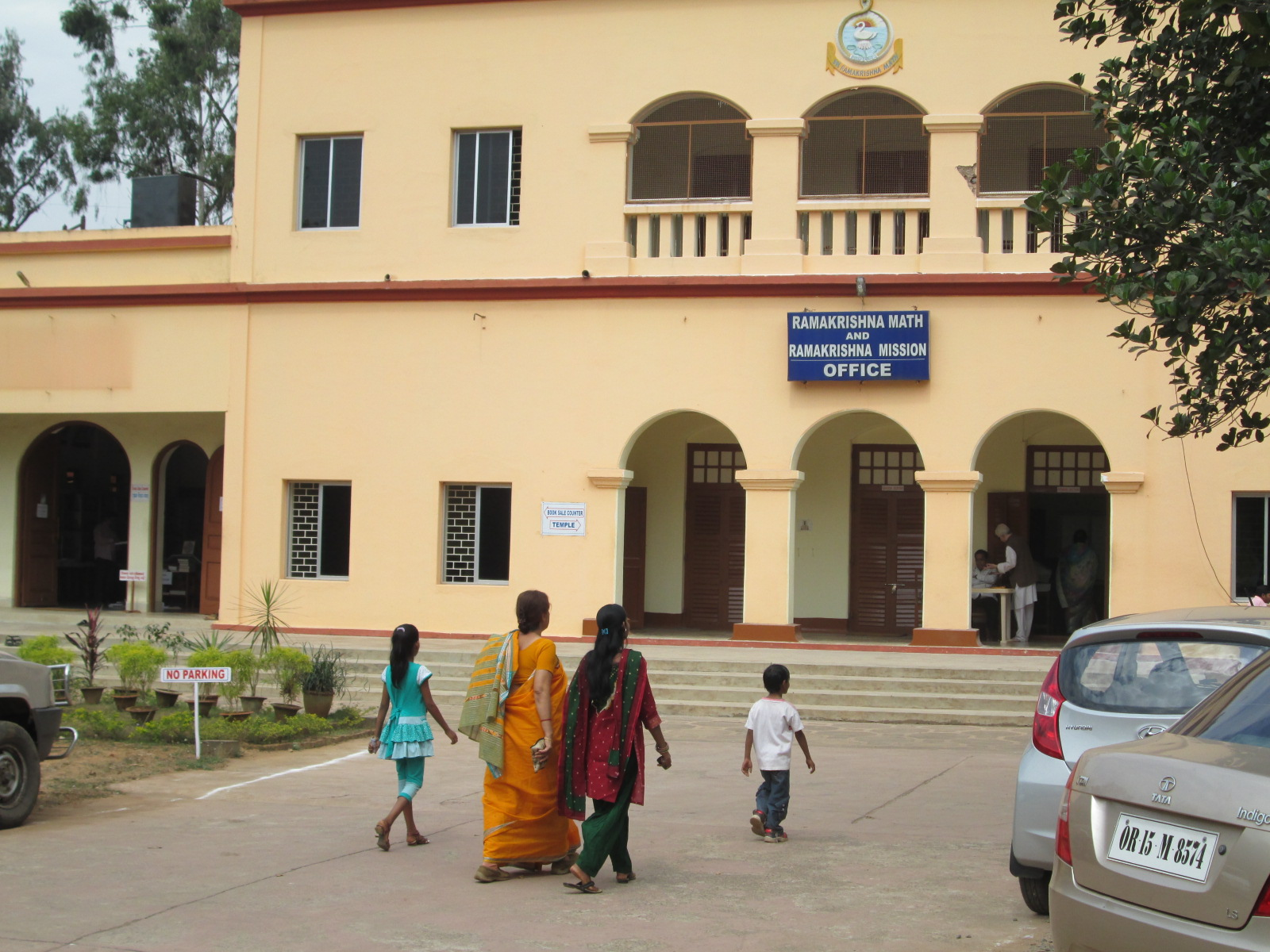
Math and Mission office

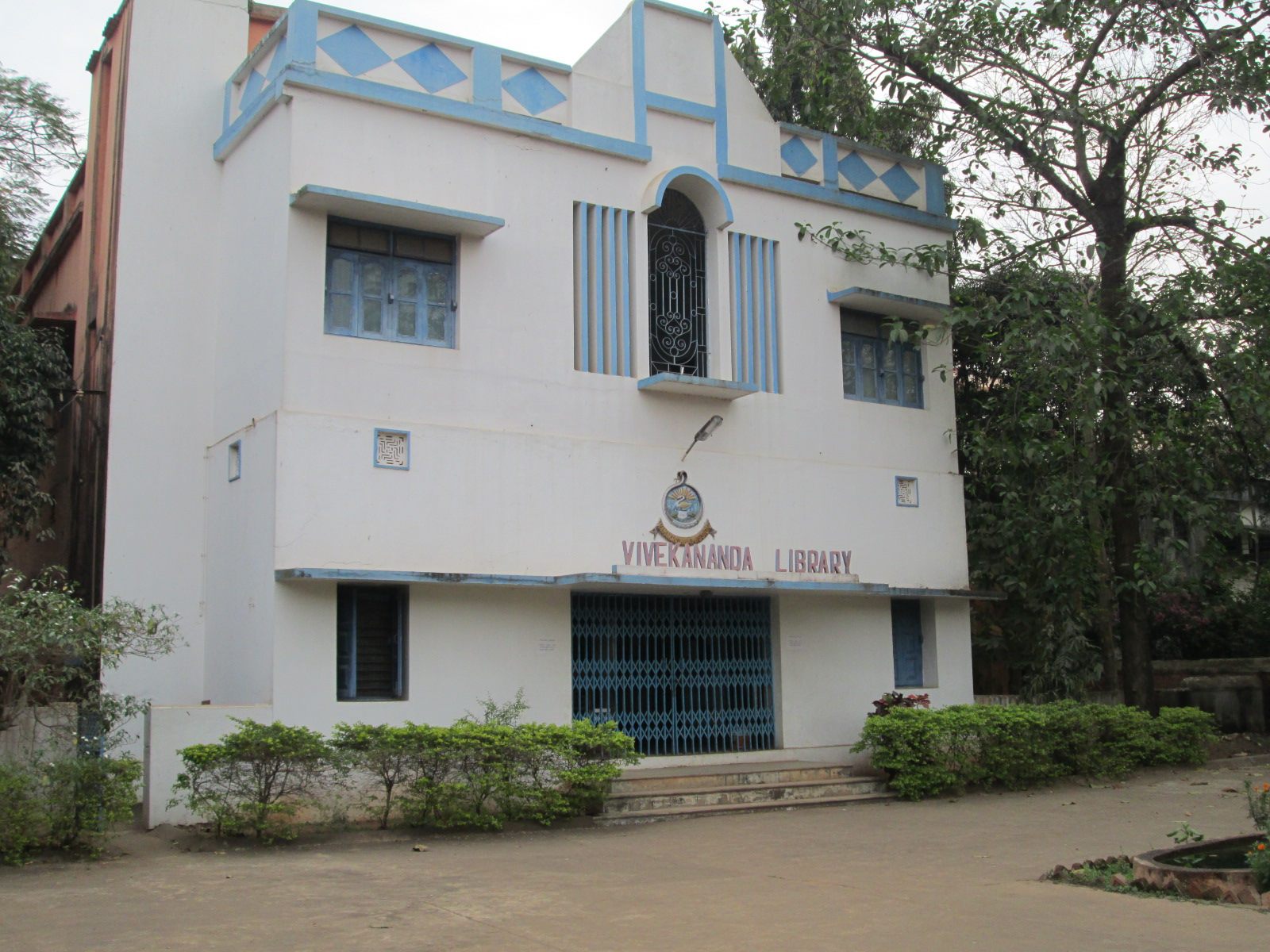
Vivekananda Library

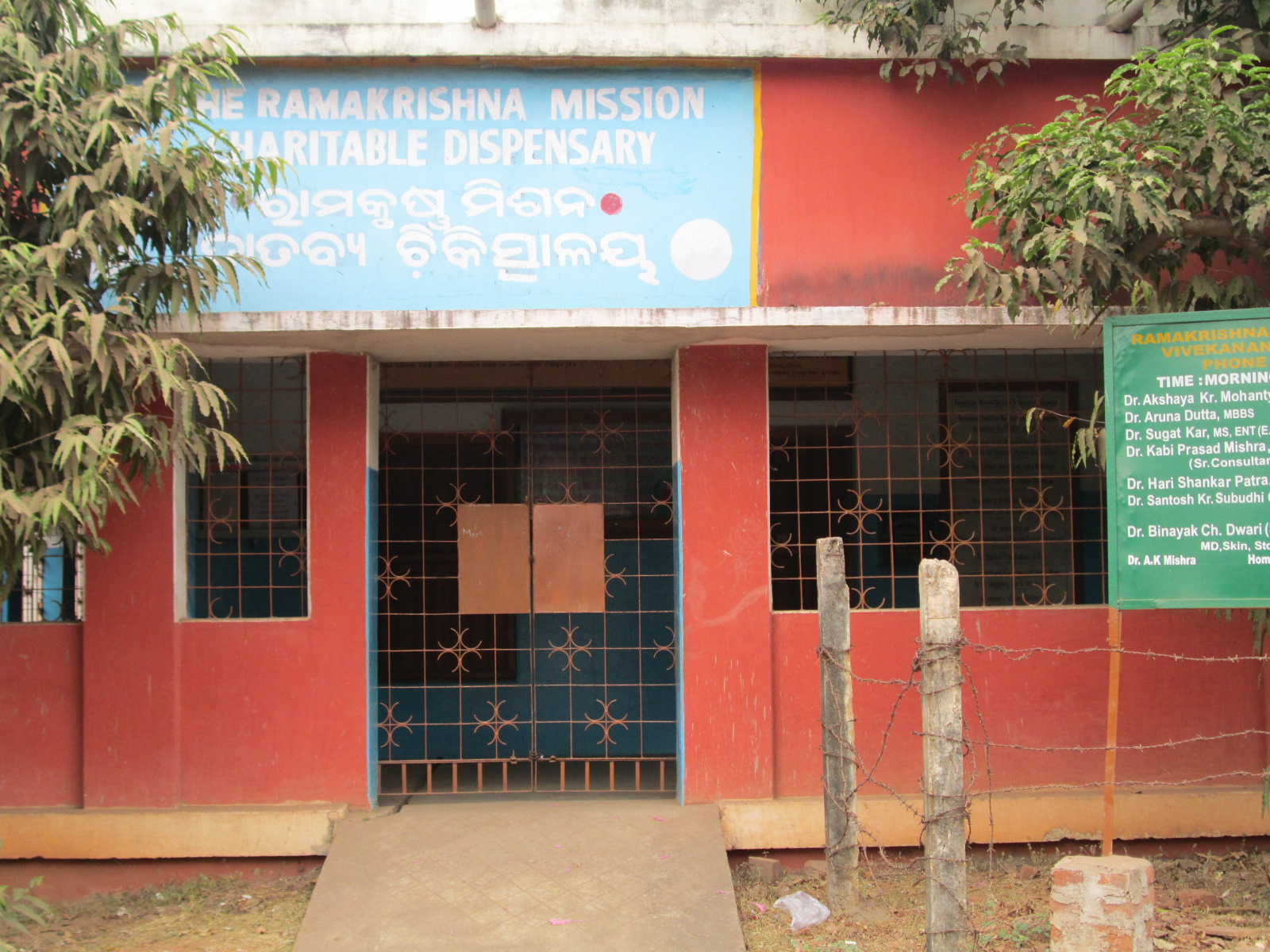
Charitable Dispensary
