= Atmano mokshartham jagat hitaya cha =

Verse from the Rig Veda

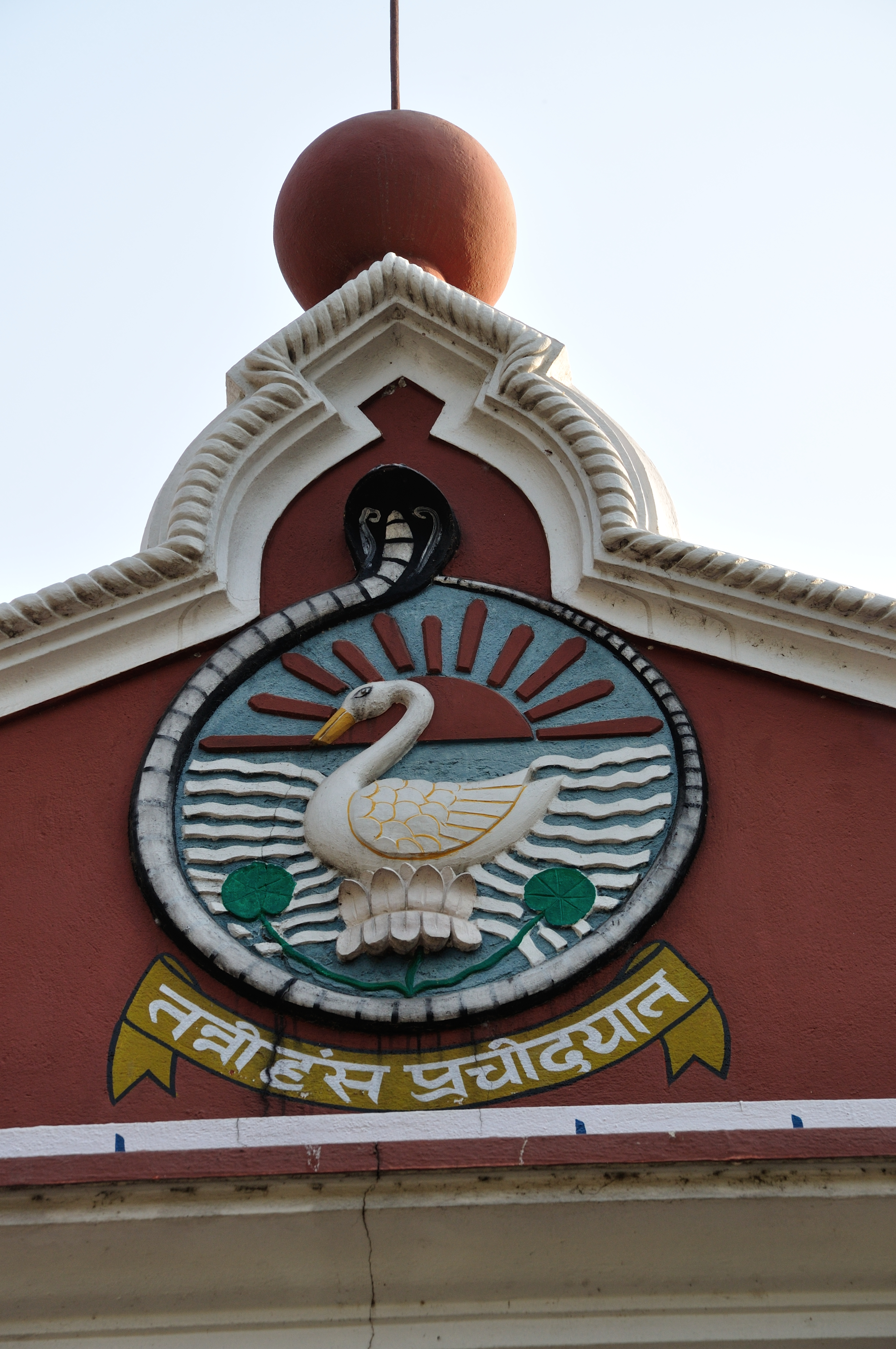
Emblem of Ramakrishna Mission

Atmano mokshartham jagat hitaya cha (Sanskrit: आत्मनो मोक्षार्थं जगद्धिताय‌ च, ātmano mokṣārthaṃ jagaddhitāya ca, translation: for the salvation of our individual self and for the well-being of all on earth) is a sloka of the Rig Veda. Vivekananda would often use it, and it became the motto of the Ramakrishna Mission that he founded in 1897 and the related Ramakrishna Math.

The motto suggests twofold aim of human life— one is to seek salvation for one's soul and the other is to address the issue of welfare of the world.

== Background ==
Roman alphabet

Atmano mokshartham jagat hitaya cha

Devanagari

आत्मनो मोक्षार्थम् जगत् हिताय च

IAST

Ātmano mokṣārtham jagat hitāya ca

Translation

For the salvation of our individual self and for the well-being of all on earth

The dictum has two messages. One is to seek salvation for one's soul and the other is to address the issue of welfare of the world. This motto also cements the two divergent and obvious aspects of 'atman' (soul) and 'jagat hitaya' (service to humanity) which are to be achieved by one's own efforts. To achieve this, constant human effort is a requisite not only for one's own salvation but also for providing service to the humanity at large.

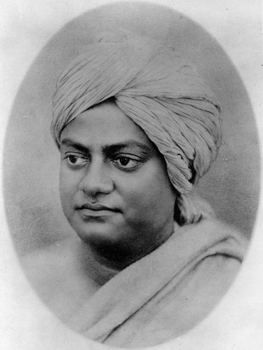
Swami Vivekananda in Kolkata in February 1897. In the same year he founded Ramakrishna Mission.

This theme was enunciated by Ramakrishna Paramahamsa to a query by Swami Vivekananda for personal liberation. Ramakrishna then admonished Vivekananda, saying that he expected him to personify the huge Banyan tree, which not only provided shade but also solace to the people. This direction of Ramakrishna resulted in Vivekananda creating the two institutions – the Ramakrishna Math and the Ramakrishna Mission – which were open to all class of people irrespective of their caste and creed. The objective of the two institutions was defined as "Atmano Mokshartham Jagat Hitaya Cha – For the emancipation of one's self and the good of the universe", which became the raison d'etre of the Ramakrishna Order. This motto coined by Vivekananda does not have any overtones of proselytizing, but it is a philosophy which helps in its adoption by people of all faiths.

== Influence ==
This theme lead to the business management model of "Shrelekar Model", which defined ‘work’ as an opportunity to do good to the world concurrently achieving spiritual and material advancement in life.

In Bali Island, Indonesia, the commitment of the people is to this motto which encompasses the spiritual values and cultural heritage of their ancestors.
