= Swach Vidyalaya =

Initiative by Indian government

Swach Vidyalaya is an initiative of Ministry of Human Resource Development, Government of India to create a functional toilet in every school by 15 August 2015. Public sector units under 25 Ministries have pledged Rs. 400 crore for the campaign and private and public sector companies would be encouraged to build toilet blocks in schools.
